= Waterton =

Waterton may refer to:

== Places ==
- Waterton Lake, Waterton Lakes National Park, in Alberta, Canada
- Waterton-Glacier International Peace Park in Canada and the USA
  - Waterton Park, Alberta, also known as Waterton, a town on the Canadian side of the International Peace Park
- Waterton, Lincolnshire, England, a deserted Medieval village
- Waterton Farm, a former seat of the Waterton family (see Armthorpe#Early_history)
- Walton Hall at Waterton Park, a former seat of Charles Waterton and the Waterton family
- Waterton, Aberdeenshire, Scotland
- Waterton, Bridgend, Pen-y-Bont ar Ogwr (Bridgend) in Wales
- Waterton, New Zealand
- Waterton, Luzerne County, Pennsylvania, USA
- Waterton, Gwinnett County, Georgia, USA
- Waterton, a neighbourhood in the eastern part of Whitehouse, Texas, USA
- Waterton, Ontario, Canada (see Leeds and the Thousand Islands, Ontario)
- Waterton, Jefferson County, Colorado, USA
- the lower section of Platte Canyon in Colorado, USA
- Waterton Castle, a ruined 17th-century castle in Scotland
- Waterton, Pennsylvania
- Waterton, Colorado

== People ==
- Charles Waterton, an English naturalist
- Bill Waterton, a Canadian test pilot and aviation correspondent
- Stuart Waterton, a cricketer
- Robert Waterton, servant of the House of Lancaster
- Hugh Waterton, servant of the House of Lancaster
- John Waterton, English politician
- Edmund Waterton, British antiquary

== See also ==
- Watertown (disambiguation)
