= New York State Route 232 =

State highway in Jefferson County, New York, US

New York State Route 232
- Map of Jefferson and Lewis counties with NY 232 highlighted in red

Route information
- Maintained by NYSDOT
- Length: 2.44 mi (3.93 km)
- Existed: c. 1962–present

Major junctions
- South end: I-81 in Watertown
- North end: US 11 in Watertown

Location
- Country: United States
- State: New York
- Counties: Jefferson

Highway system
- New York Highways; Interstate; US; State; Reference; Parkways
← NY 231	→ NY 233

New York State Route 232 (NY 232) is a short state highway located within the town of Watertown in Jefferson County, New York, in the United States. It extends for 2.44 miles (3.93 km) from an interchange with Interstate 81 (I-81) near the community of Rices to a junction with U.S. Route 11 (US 11) southwest of Watertown Center. The route connects to County Route 64 (CR 64) at its western terminus and intersects CR 65 east of Rices. NY 232 was assigned in the early 1960s, originally using what is now Old Rices Road near I-81. It was moved onto a new alignment to the south in the late 1960s.

== Route description ==
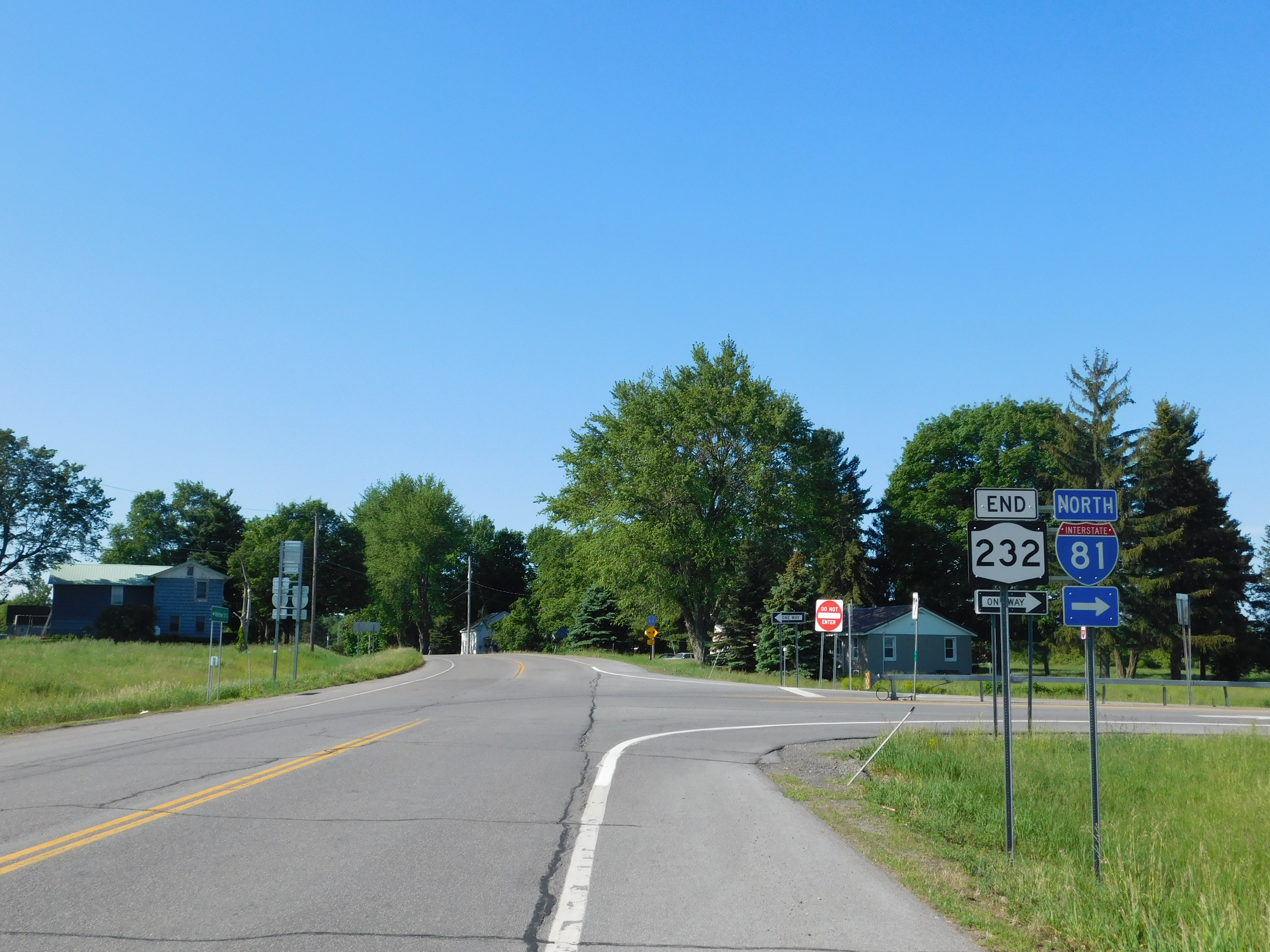
South end of NY 232 at I-81 in Watertown

NY 232 begins at the ramps leading to and from I-81 northbound at exit 44 southwest of the hamlet of Rices. The ramps also serve as the north end of CR 64, which continues south from I-81 to US 11 in the town of Adams. NY 232 heads northeast from the interchange, paralleling I-81 for a quarter-mile (0.4 km) to a four-way intersection with Old Rices Road and a state-maintained extension of CR 62. The latter highway is part of NY 970K, an unsigned reference route that links NY 232 to the southbound half of exit 44. At this point, NY 232 turns east, leaving the vicinity of I-81 to head through a rural area south of the city of Watertown.

The route's easterly progression is short-lived, lasting for just a half-mile (0.8 km) as the route crosses over the St. Lawrence Subdivision, a rail line owned by CSX Transportation. Past the railroad overpass, the highway curves back to the northeast, passing south of Rices and intersecting CR 65 as it continues through mostly open and undeveloped fields for another 1.5 miles (2.4 km). The rural landscape eventually gives way to homes and businesses, which mark the southwestern edge of a commercial district surrounding US 11. NY 232 heads into the district, where it ends at an intersection with US 11.

== History ==
The section of I-81 between the village of Adams and the city of Watertown was constructed in the late 1950s. At the time, I-81 connected to the hamlets of Rices and Watertown Center via Rices Road, a local highway that went north from the I-81 interchange and made a sharp eastward turn to cross the railroad tracks at Rices before continuing northeastward to US 11. Rices Road was acquired by the state of New York c. 1962 and designated NY 232. In 1965, the New York State Department of Transportation began looking at ways to eliminate the turn and grade crossing at Rices. The results of the study led the state to develop a project moving NY 232 onto a new, more southerly alignment that bypassed the turn at Rices and crossed the rail line on an overpass. Construction on the road began June 14, 1968, and was completed in November 1969 at a cost of $1.36 million (equivalent to $12.3 million in 2024). The old routing of NY 232 through Rices is now named Old Rices Road.

== Major intersections ==
The entire route is in Watertown, Jefferson County.

mi	km	Destinations	Notes
0.00	0.00	I-81 – Syracuse, Canada	Southern terminus, exit 151 (I-81)
2.44	3.93	US 11 – Watertown	Northern terminus
1.000 mi = 1.609 km; 1.000 km = 0.621 mi
