= Rodman (CDP), New York =

Rodman, New York
- Census-designated place
- Location within New York Location within the United States
- Coordinates: 43°51′3″N 75°56′26″W
- Country: United States
- State: New York
- County: Jefferson
- Town: Rodman

Area
  - Total: 0.16 sq mi (0.41 km^{2})
  - Land: 0.16 sq mi (0.41 km^{2})
  - Water: 0 sq mi (0.00 km^{2})
- Elevation: 724 ft (221 m)

Population (2020)
  - Total: 152
  - Density: 953.0/sq mi (367.97/km^{2})
- Time zone: UTC-5 (Eastern (EST))
  - Summer (DST): UTC-4 (EDT)
- ZIP Codes: 13682 (Rodman); 13606 (Adams Center)
- Area codes: 315, 650
- FIPS code: 36-63330
- GNIS feature ID: 0962799

Rodman is a hamlet and census-designated place (CDP) in the town of Rodman, Jefferson County, New York, United States. As of the 2010 census, the CDP population was 153, out of 1,176 in the entire town of Rodman.

== Geography ==
The hamlet of Rodman is in southern Jefferson County in the western part of the town of Rodman. It is in the valley of Sandy Creek, a direct tributary of Lake Ontario, and sits just southwest (downstream) of the creek's confluence with Gulf Stream. New York State Route 177 runs along the southern edge of the community, leading west 3 miles (5 km) to Adams Center and U.S. Route 11, and east 24 miles (39 km) across the north end of the Tug Hill Plateau to Lowville. Watertown, the Jefferson county seat, is 10 miles (16 km) to the north via county roads and US-11.

According to the United States Census Bureau, the Rodman CDP has a total area of 0.12 square miles (0.30 km^{2}), all land.

== Demographics ==
Historical population
Census	Pop.	Note	%±
2020	152		—
U.S. Decennial Census

== Education ==
The school district is the South Jefferson Central School District.
