= Watertown (town), New York =

Watertown Center, New York
- Town
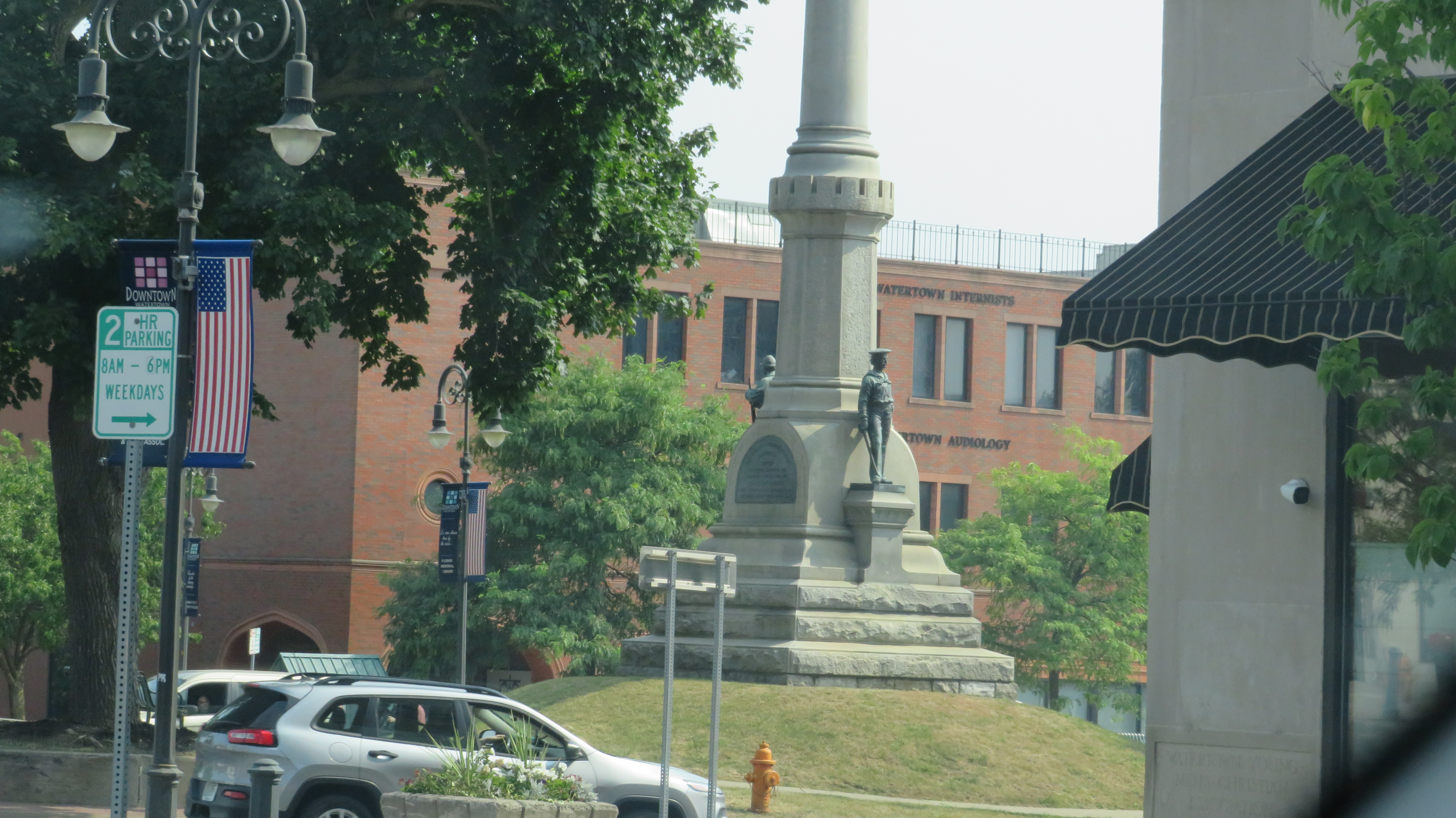
- Public Square

- Location within New York Location within the United States
- Coordinates: 43°56′10″N 75°55′29″W
- Country: United States
- State: New York
- County: Jefferson

Government
  - Type: Town Council
  - Town Supervisor: Joel R. Bartlett (D)
  - Town Council: Members' List: • Edward Smith (R); • Paul V. Desormo (R); • Stephen L. Rich (D); • David W. Prosser (R)

Area
  - Total: 35.8 sq mi (92.7 km^{2})
  - Land: 35.7 sq mi (92.4 km^{2})
  - Water: 0.12 sq mi (0.3 km^{2})
- Elevation: 538 ft (164 m)

Population (2020)
  - Total: 5,913
  - Density: 170/sq mi (64/km^{2})
- Time zone: UTC-5 (Eastern (EST))
  - Summer (DST): UTC-4 (EDT)
- ZIP codes: 13601 (Watertown); 13606 (Adams Center); 13682 (Rodman)
- Area code: 315
- FIPS code: 36-78619
- GNIS feature ID: 0979605
- Website: townofwatertownny.gov

Watertown Center is a town in Jefferson County, New York, United States. The population was 5,913 at the 2020 census. The town is located in the central part of the county and borders the city of Watertown to the south, east, and west. As the city has a population of 24,685, or four times the town's population, references to "Watertown, New York", usually apply to the city rather than the town.

== History ==
Numerous sites of aboriginal habitation were found by early surveyors of this region. The region was later part of Macomb's Purchase.

Watertown was established as a town on March 14, 1800, from Mexico before the formation of Jefferson County, while still in Oneida County. The towns of Rutland (1802) and Hounsfield (1806) were soon formed from parts of Watertown.

The town was first settled in 1800 around the time of the first permanent US military presence in the region, which was established at nearby Sackets Harbor to guard the international border and to fight smuggling in the St. Lawrence region.

In 1816, the community of Watertown set itself off from the town by incorporating as a village. It became a city in 1869.

The John Losee House was added to the National Register of Historic Places in 2014.

== Geography ==
According to the United States Census Bureau, the town has a total area of 35.8 square miles (92.7 km^{2}), of which 35.7 square miles (92.4 km^{2}) are land and 0.1 square miles (0.3 km^{2}), or 0.28%, are water. The town is bordered to the north by the city of Watertown and by the Black River.

The town of Watertown is in central Jefferson County, and is bordered to the north by the city of Watertown and the towns of Brownville, Pamelia and Le Ray, to the east by the town of Rutland, to the south by the towns of Adams and Rodman, and to the west by the town of Hounsfield.

Interstate 81 passes through the western part of the town. U.S. Route 11 is a north–south highway running parallel to I-81 through the town. New York State Route 3, New York State Route 12, New York State Route 12F, New York State Route 126, and New York State Route 232 are east–west highways through Watertown. Many of these highways converge in the city of Watertown.

The area is served by Watertown International Airport to the west in the town of Hounsfield.

Three full-power television stations, WPBS (PBS), WWNY (CBS) and WWTI (ABC), currently serve the Watertown area.

== Demographics ==
Historical population
Census	Pop.	Note	%±
1820	2,766		—
1830	4,768		72.4%
1840	5,027		5.4%
1850	7,201		43.2%
1860	7,567		5.1%
1870	1,373		−81.9%
1880	1,264		−7.9%
1890	1,215		−3.9%
1900	1,159		−4.6%
1910	1,097		−5.3%
1920	1,116		1.7%
1930	1,270		13.8%
1940	1,399		10.2%
1950	1,752		25.2%
1960	2,492		42.2%
1970	3,026		21.4%
1980	3,098		2.4%
1990	4,341		40.1%
2000	4,482		3.2%
2010	4,470		−0.3%
2020	5,913		32.3%
U.S. Decennial Census

As of the census of 2000, there were 4,482 people, 1,407 households, and 1,018 families residing in the town. The population density was 124.6 inhabitants per square mile (48.1/km^{2}). There were 1,502 housing units at an average density of 41.7 per square mile (16.1/km^{2}). The racial makeup of the town was 83.94% White, 11.24% Black, 0.33% Native American, 0.60% Asian, 0.02% Pacific Islander, 3.39% from other races, and 0.47% from two or more races. Hispanic or Latino of any race were 6.85% of the population.

There were 1,407 households, out of which 34.7% had children under the age of 18 living with them, 61.2% were married couples living together, 7.3% had a female householder with no husband present, and 27.6% were non-families. 22.4% of all households were made up of individuals, and 9.5% had someone living alone who was 65 years of age or older. The average household size was 2.57 and the average family size was 3.02.

In the town, the population was spread out, with 21.3% under the age of 18, 6.8% from 18 to 24, 37.6% from 25 to 44, 24.4% from 45 to 64, and 9.9% who were 65 years of age or older. The median age was 37 years. For every 100 females, there were 143.6 males. For every 100 females age 18 and over, there were 158.0 males.

The median income for a household in the town was $41,961, and the median income for a family was $46,563. Males had a median income of $35,475 versus $21,638 for females. The per capita income for the town was $21,786. About 3.8% of families and 4.7% of the population were below the poverty line, including 5.6% of those under age 18 and 1.7% of those age 65 or over.

== Communities and locations in the Town of Watertown ==
- Burrville (formerly "Burrs Mills") – A hamlet near the eastern town line on NY-12. The name is from Captain John Burr and his family, early settlers. The community was an early rival for another community which became the City of Watertown.
- Dry Hill – High ground in the southern part of the town and the location of a skiing area. The name is based on the relatively low level of the water table in the area (making it very difficult to draw a successful water well in the area).
- East Watertown – A hamlet near the eastern town line on NY-126.
- Fields Settlement – A location at the western town line on County Road 63.
- Huntingtonville – A hamlet in the northeastern corner of the town by the Black River. It is now a suburb of the city.
- Rices – A hamlet in the southeastern part of the town on Route 232 by Interstate 81.
- Rices Junction – A location northeast of Rice on Route 232.
- Watertown Center – A hamlet on US 11 at County Road 116. Watertown Center is the location of the town government.
