= Watertown Historic District =

Watertown Historic District or Watertown Commercial Historic District may refer to:

in the United States

(by state)

- Watertown Center Historic District, Watertown, CT, listed on the NRHP in Connecticut
- Watertown Arsenal Historic District, Watertown, MA, listed on the NRHP in Massachusetts
- Watertown Historic District (Watertown, Ohio), listed on the NRHP in Ohio
- Watertown Commercial Historic District (Jefferson, South Dakota), listed on the NRHP in South Dakota
- Watertown Commercial Historic District (Watertown, Tennessee), listed on the NRHP in Tennessee

== See also ==
- Watertown (disambiguation)
