= Robert Flemming =

Robert Flemming (died 1456), was dean of Lincoln.

== Background ==
Robert Flemming, born in the diocese of York, was likely an illegitimate son of Robert Flemming, esquire, of Wath, near Ripon (d.1459). His aunt, Cecily Fleming, married, in 1407, Robert Waterton, 'Henry IV's esquire and right-hand man'. His uncle, Richard Fleming (d.1431), was Bishop of Lincoln and the founder of Lincoln College, Oxford.

He was probably connected with the earlier days of the college, the foundation of which was left by his uncle in an incomplete and unfinished state. At any rate, he displayed afterwards his care for this society by some valuable presents. Probably also he had an early connection with the church at Lincoln, inasmuch as twenty years after his uncle's death, under the episcopate of Bishop Lumley, he was chosen to be dean (1451).

Lincoln Cathedral was then in a most disturbed state from the long and bitter struggle which had been carried on between the late dean, John Mackworth, and the bishop, William Alnwick. Doubtless the disputes between the episcopal and decanal powers still continued, and this may have induced Flemming to leave his cathedral and become a resident in Italy. Here also he had far greater facilities for cultivating his literary tastes. Flemming is said by Leland and Pits to have distinguished himself at Oxford, and to have gained a reputation for his elegant Latin scholarship.

== Life in Italy ==
His journey to Italy is attributed to his eager desire for instruction. He visited, according to the same writers, all the more celebrated universities, and formed friendships with their most learned scholars. At Ferrara he became the pupil of Baptista Guarino, professor of Greek and Latin, and attended his lectures for a considerable period. He then went to Rome, where he remained several years intent upon study. Here he formed a friendship with Platina, the author of the ‘Lives of the Popes,’ and librarian of the Vatican, and other learned men, and became known to the reigning pontiff, Sixtus IV, a pope whose sole recommendation was his love of letters. Pope Sixtus appointed Flemming to the office of prothonotary, and he thus became employed in the complicated affairs of the Roman see. In summer, during the hot season, it was his custom to retreat to Tivoli, and here he composed his poems, written in heroic metre and dedicated to the pope.

== Legacy ==
These poems were entitled: 1. ‘Lucubrationes Tiburtinæ.’ 2. ‘Epistolæ ad diversos.’ 3. ‘Carmina diversi generis.’ In addition to these Flemming is said to have compiled a dictionary of the Greek and Latin tongues, but whether this was written during his sojourn in Italy or after his return to England does not appear. Other works (unspecified) are attributed to him. Flemming, on his return from Italy, bestowed some valuable manuscripts, curiously illuminated, and, according to Wood, ‘limned on their margins with gold,’ on Lincoln College, which are probably still to be found among the manuscript collections of that college. He also gave the college copies of his own works, and a table for the high altar in the college chapel. He had probably returned to England before 1467, in which year he was installed into the prebend of Leighton Manor in Lincoln Cathedral. This he exchanged in 1478 for that of Leighton Buzzard. There does not appear to be any special record of his work as dean of Lincoln. Both his predecessor and his successor were remarkable for their turbulence. But the great number of dispensations from Pope Sixtus found to be existing in Lincoln Cathedral at the visitation in 1501 may have been due to Flemming's influence with that pope. He died in 1483.
