= John Waterton =

Member of the Parliament of England

John Waterton (died 1417) was an English landowner, administrator, courtier, diplomat, and politician who sat in the Parliament of England.

== Origins ==
From a family that had lived on the Isle of Axholme since about 1150, he and his brother Hugh Waterton (died 1409) were sons of a prominent Lincolnshire landowner, William Waterton, of Waterton, and his wife Elizabeth, daughter of Sir Roger Newmarch (died 1352), of Womersley, and his wife Maud.

== Career ==
Born before 1360 and spending his early life in Lincolnshire, in common with his father and other members of the family he entered the service of John of Gaunt and his son Henry of Bolingbroke, the future King Henry IV. In 1391 he accompanied Henry on his crusading expedition to Prussia and Lithuania during the Lithuanian Civil War. He did not appear on the national scene in England until involvement in court cases in London in 1394 and 1397, followed in 1399 by a mission to buy horses for the new king in Ireland.

The year 1400 saw a number of appointments: he served as High Sheriff of Hampshire and was made Receiver-General of the Duchy of Cornwall for Henry, Prince of Wales, remaining in post until the prince became king in 1413. He was given a ten-year lease of the manor of Pyworthy in Devon, which had been confiscated from the beheaded Earl of Salisbury, the valuables of another traitor, the MP Thomas Shelley, and in addition the lands forfeited by a third rebel, Thomas Wintershall, of Bramley in Surrey. Himself a widower, Waterton married Wintershall's widow, through her gaining valuable estates in Surrey and Hampshire which gave him a base close to the seats of power at Westminster and Windsor. With the property to qualify for Parliament, he was elected for the Surrey seat in 1402.

In 1410 two royal grants added to his interests in the north of England, both in Yorkshire, first being the lands of the late William Bowes and secondly those of Richard Duffield. In 1411 he served as High Sheriff of Surrey. When the young prince became king in 1413, further promotions followed. He was made Master of the Horse, holding the post until 1416, and next year Constable of Windsor Castle, which he held for life. Beyond these important national offices, he was employed on the international scene. In 1414 he acted as English ambassador to the Holy Roman Emperor Sigismund, then in 1415 to King Ferdinand I of Aragon, and in 1416 was beside Henry V for a meeting with his ally John the Fearless, Duke of Burgundy, followed in 1417 by a meeting with ambassadors from France.

He was dead by 1 November 1417.

== Family ==
His first wife (died before 1400) was a daughter of JOAN, dau of Peter de Mauley, 2nd Baron Mauley, and they had four known children:

Robert Waterton of Methley.
John John Waterton (died 1414).
Eleanor, who in about 1409 married Sir Robert Babthorpe, later Comptroller of the Household.
Mundane, who married Thomas Metham.

By licence dated 24 April 1400 for a wedding at Burpham in Surrey, he married Joan, widow of the MP Thomas Wintershall.
