= William Alnwick =

15th-century Bishop of Lincoln and Bishop of Norwich

- Bishop of Lincoln
- Appointed: 19 September 1436
- Term ended: 5 December 1449
- Predecessor: William Grey
- Successor: Marmaduke Lumley
- Other posts: Bishop of Norwich; Archdeacon of Salisbury

Orders
- Consecration: 18 August 1426

Personal details
- Died: 5 December 1449
- Denomination: Roman Catholic
- Education: Cambridge University

William Alnwick (died 1449) was an English Catholic clergyman. He was Bishop of Norwich (1426–1436) and Bishop of Lincoln (1436–1449).

Educated at Cambridge, Alnwick was an ecclesiastic priest. He was probably the same hermit who lived in the St Benet's Chapel that was screened off as part of Westminster Abbey. On the night of 20 March 1413, as King Henry IV lay dying in the Jerusalem Chamber, his son and heir apparent Prince Henry wandered the precincts and spoke to Alnwick. On 20 March 1415, Alnwick was appointed as confessor-general of Syon Abbey, but after a year returned to Westminster. During Henry V's reign he became Archdeacon of Salisbury, but by early 1421 had been appointed King's Secretary, and is recorded as attending Privy Council meetings. In the new reign he was forced to surrender his seals of office to Parliament before being named Keeper of the Privy Seal on 19 December 1422. He had custody of the seal until 24 February 1432.

Alnwick was nominated to the see of Norwich on 27 February 1426 and consecrated on 18 August 1426. He was translated to the see of Lincoln on 19 September 1436.

While bishop Alnwick built the east wing of bishop's palace at Lincoln, with chapel and dining-parlour and a gateway tower.

While at Lincoln Alnwick attempted a resolution of a dispute within the cathedral, producing an elaborate arbitration. He then reviewed the whole body of statutes of the diocese, then largely unaltered since the Norman Conquest, creating an improved one. He finished this by 1440, but the dean of the cathedral was hostile, and they argued over the implementation of the reforms until Alnwick's death.

Alnwick was an assiduous heresy-hunter, and persecutor of the Lollards, punishing them with imprisonment, forced entry into monasteries and, in at least one case, execution. He twice tried Margery Baxter who was sentenced to be flogged in church and in public. He also tried Hawise Mone (fl. 1428–1430) and they both agreed to recant their heresies.

Alnwick was involved in the foundation and building of Eton College and King's College, Cambridge, as well as modifying Norwich and Lincoln Cathedrals, and the palaces in both of the dioceses of which he was bishop.

He died in 1449, and was buried in Lincoln Cathedral with a lengthy epitaph, now destroyed, recording his virtues. In his will he left money to St Michael's Church, Alnwick, as well as vestments, a missal, an antiphoner, and a chalice.

Alnwick died in office as Bishop of Lincoln on 5 December 1449.

His executors are listed as: John Breton, of Therfeld, parson; John Wygnell, master & doctor of decretals; Thomas Dunken, of Chalfhunt, master & parson; Thomas Twyer, master & parson

== Citations ==
Political offices
Preceded by John Stafford	Lord Privy Seal; 1422–1432	Succeeded by William Lyndwood
Catholic Church titles
Preceded by John Wakering	Bishop of Norwich; 1426–1436	Succeeded by Thomas Brunce
Preceded by William Grey	Bishop of Lincoln; 1436–1449	Succeeded by Marmaduke Lumley
