= Rodman, New York =

- Town
- Location within New York Location within the United States
- Coordinates: 43°51′3″N 75°54′56″W
- Country: United States
- State: New York
- County: Jefferson

Government
  - Type: Town Council
  - Town Supervisor: Lisa Cole Worden(R)
  - Town Council: Members' List: • Stuart Tamblin(R); • Vance Carpenter(R); • Mike Gaylord (R); • Arthur Baderman(R)

Area
  - Total: 42.42 sq mi (109.87 km^{2})
  - Land: 42.37 sq mi (109.73 km^{2})
  - Water: 0.054 sq mi (0.14 km^{2})
- Elevation: 899 ft (274 m)

Population (2010)
  - Total: 1,176
  - Estimate (2016): 1,170
  - Density: 27.6/sq mi (10.66/km^{2})
- Time zone: UTC-5 (Eastern (EST))
  - Summer (DST): UTC-4 (EDT)
- ZIP Codes: 13682 (Rodman); 13601 (Watertown); 13605 (Adams); 13606 (Adams Center)
- Area code: 315
- FIPS code: 36-045-63341
- GNIS feature ID: 0979429
- Website: www.townofrodmanny.org

Rodman is a town in Jefferson County, New York, United States. The population was 1,176 at the 2010 census. The name is derived from a public official, Daniel Rodman.

The town is in the southeastern part of the county and is south of Watertown.

== History ==
Prehistoric remains in the town document the lives of the original natives.

The region was part of Macomb's Purchase. The town was first settled around 1801.

Rodman was organized as a town in 1804 from part of the town of Adams. The town was originally called "Harrison" after an early landowner, but was later changed to "Rodman", the name of the clerk of the legislature, due to confusion with other similarly named communities. Part of Rodman was used in 1808 to form the Town of Pinckney (Now part of Lewis County).

== Notable people ==
- Rodman native Benjamin Burr (1818-1894) served in the Wisconsin State Assembly and was a businessman in Stevens Point, Wisconsin.
- Rodman native Adele M. Fielde (1839–1916) became a Baptist missionary in China. She wrote books about China, parliamentary procedure, and the Swatow dialect.
- Rodman native Mary A. Hitchcock Wakelin (1834-1900) was a temperance reformer.
- Rodman native Frank Winfield Woolworth (1852-1919) made a fortune from his "five and dime" mercantile empire.

== Geography ==
According to the United States Census Bureau, the town has a total area of 42.3 square miles (109.5 km^{2}), of which 0.04 square miles (0.1 km^{2}), or 0.13%, are water.

The town is north of Syracuse and south of Watertown, on the western slopes of the Tug Hill Plateau. The eastern town line is the border of Lewis County.

New York State Route 177 is an east–west highway crossing the town.

The North and South Branches of Sandy Creek run through Rodman and eventually join near Litt's Bridge at the western border of the town.

== Demographics ==
Historical population
Census	Pop.	Note	%±
1820	1,735		—
1830	1,901		9.6%
1840	1,702		−10.5%
1850	1,784		4.8%
1860	1,808		1.3%
1870	1,604		−11.3%
1880	1,517		−5.4%
1890	1,287		−15.2%
1900	1,212		−5.8%
1910	1,123		−7.3%
1920	1,027		−8.5%
1930	935		−9.0%
1940	856		−8.4%
1950	816		−4.7%
1960	765		−6.2%
1970	772		0.9%
1980	836		8.3%
1990	1,016		21.5%
2000	1,149		13.1%
2010	1,176		2.3%
2016 (est.)	1,170	▼	−0.5%
U.S. Decennial Census

As of the census of 2000, there were 1,147 people, 385 households, and 314 families residing in the town. The population density was 27.2 inhabitants per square mile (10.5/km^{2}). There were 455 housing units at an average density of 10.8 per square mile (4.2/km^{2}). The racial makeup of the town was 98.34% White, 0.17% African American, 0.61% Native American, 0.09% from other races, and 0.78% from two or more races. Hispanic or Latino of any race were 1.39% of the population.

There were 385 households, out of which 46.5% had children under the age of 18 living with them, 69.1% were married couples living together, 6.0% had a female householder with no husband present, and 18.2% were non-families. 13.5% of all households were made up of individuals, and 5.7% had someone living alone who was 65 years of age or older. The average household size was 2.98 and the average family size was 3.26.

In the town, the population was spread out, with 30.9% under the age of 18, 8.0% from 18 to 24, 31.3% from 25 to 44, 21.3% from 45 to 64, and 8.5% who were 65 years of age or older. The median age was 35 years. For every 100 females, there were 110.1 males. For every 100 females age 18 and over, there were 107.0 males.

The median income for a household in the town was $36,339, and the median income for a family was $43,750. Males had a median income of $28,750 versus $25,764 for females. The per capita income for the town was $15,453. About 6.7% of families and 9.5% of the population were below the poverty line, including 11.6% of those under age 18 and 5.2% of those age 65 or over.

== Communities and locations in Rodman ==
- Babbits Corners – A location in the southeastern part of the town at the junction of NY-177 and County Road 189.
- Dillen – A hamlet in the northwestern corner of the town on County Road 155.
- East Rodman – A hamlet near the eastern town line on County Roads 69 and 156. It was also called "Whitesville".
- Rodman – A hamlet (and census-designated place) at the junction of County Roads 69 and 97 in the west-central part of the town.
- Ross Corners – A location in the southwestern part of the town on County Road 97.
- Shingle Gulf – A canyon in the northeastern part of Rodman.
- Tremaines Corners – A hamlet southeast of the center of the town on County Roads 95 and 177.
- Whitford Corners – A location in the northwestern part of the town on NY-177. The location was also called "West Rodman" and "Toad Hollow".
- Zoar – A hamlet northeast of Rodman village, formerly known as "Unionville".
