= Listed buildings in Walton, Wakefield =

Walton is a civil parish in the metropolitan borough of the City of Wakefield, West Yorkshire, England. The parish contains 20 listed buildings that are recorded in the National Heritage List for England. Of these, two are listed at Grade II*, the middle of the three grades, and the others are at Grade II, the lowest grade. The parish contains the village of Walton and the surrounding countryside. The most important building in the parish is Walton Hall, a country house on an island in a lake, which is listed, together with a number of associated structures, including the iron footbridge leading to it. The Barnsley Canal, no longer in use, passes through the parish, and three bridges crossing it are listed. The other listed buildings are houses, farmhouses, and farm buildings. The list also contains a listed farmhouse in the parish of Wintersett.

== Key ==
Grade	Criteria
II*	Particularly important buildings of more than special interest
II	Buildings of national importance and special interest

== Buildings ==
Name and location	Photograph	Date	Notes	Grade
Water Gate, Walton Hall; 53.64199°N 1.45077°W		Medieval (probable)	The remains of the water gate are in stone and consist of a central segmental arch, with an inner recess for a door leading to a flight of steps. There are flanking turrets, and the whole is surmounted by a wooden cross.	II
Rose Farmhouse; 53.64284°N 1.46277°W	—	Mid 17th century	A stone house with a stone slate roof and coped gables. There are two storeys, three bays, and a continuous rear outshut. The doorway has a chamfered surround and composite jambs. The ground floor windows have chamfered surrounds and a continuous hood mould, and in the upper floor are casement windows with plain surrounds.	II
Pear Tree Farmhouse, Wintersett; 53.63750°N 1.42047°W		Mid to late 17th century	The farmhouse, which was extended in the 18th century, is stone with quoins, the extension is in orange-red brick, and the roofs are in stone slate. There are two storeys, a front of three bays, a rear outshut, and an added kitchen. The central doorway has monolithic jambs, and in the extension is a porch. The rear extension contains a three-light mullioned window, and there are mullioned windows with a continuous hood mould in the left return.	II
Overtown Grange Farmhouse; 53.64424°N 1.46307°W	—	Late 17th century	The farmhouse is in stone, with quoins, and a tiled roof with coped gables and kneelers. There are two storeys, three bays, and a single-storey rear outshut. The windows, which have chamfered surrounds, have been altered, and above the ground floor windows and doorway is a continuous hood mould, stepped over the doorway.	II
Walton Common Farmhouse; 53.64412°N 1.47144°W	—	Late 17th or early 18th century	The farmhouse is in stone, with quoins, and a stone slate roof with coped gables and kneelers. There are two storeys and four bays. In the second bay is a doorway that has a lintel with a depressed Tudor arch, and in the fourth bay is a gabled porch. The windows are mullioned with hood moulds, and contain arched lights with sunken spandrels.	II
Cottages north of 192 Shay Lane; 53.64827°N 1.46643°W	—	Mid 18th century	A house and attached cottages, the ground floor in stone, the upper floor in brick, with quoins, and roofs are in stone slate with coped gables. There are two storeys and two parallel ranges. The north range has four bays, the house is recessed, and it contains a doorway with monolithic jambs. The windows are sashes, some horizontally-sliding, and some have lintels with false voussoirs.	II
Culvert and sluice, Walton Hall; 53.64210°N 1.44993°W		Mid 18th century	The culvert is in stone and has a segmental-arched entrance. The sluice, about 10 metres (33 ft) to the north, dates from the 19th century, and is in iron, with an earlier wooden gate.	II
Walton Hall; 53.64166°N 1.45115°W		1767–68	A country house, later a hotel, it is on an island in a lake. The house is in stone on a plinth, with a cornice and blocking course, and a hipped stone slate roof. There are three storeys and a basement, a double-pile U-shaped plan, a symmetrical front of eight bays, with a pediment containing an achievement over the middle four bays, and rear wings with six bays. Between the bays on the front are giant channelled pilasters, and in the centre is a Tuscan porch, and a doorway with an architrave and a carved lintel. The windows are sashes with raised surrounds. At the rear is a central gabled porch between staircase windows. In the right wing is a Tuscan porch and a Venetian window.	II*
Stable block, Walton Hall; 53.64301°N 1.45111°W		c. 1768	The stable block is in stone with hipped stone slate roofs, and has a single storey, with four ranges forming a rectangle around a courtyard. In the north and south ranges are segmental-headed archways. The east range contains a central coped gable, and a doorway with engaged Tuscan columns and a triangular pediment, above which is an open quatrefoil, and a circular hole in the apex.	II
Wall, boathouses, steps and landing stage, Walton Hall; 53.64134°N 1.45066°W		Mid to late 18th century	The wall around the island is in stone, with flat slightly projecting coping, and at regular intervals are projecting piers. On the west side is a semicircular landing stage approached by five steps. To the left of it are two boathouses that have shallow arches with raised keystones and projecting piers.	II
Blue Bridge, Barnsley Canal; 53.62774°N 1.44987°W		Late 18th century	An accommodation bridge crossing the canal, it is in stone and consists of a single horseshoe elliptical arch. There is a band and a parapet ending in square piers, and the retaining walls are splayed.	II
Haw Park Bridge, Barnsley Canal; 53.63965°N 1.45664°W		Late 18th century	An accommodation bridge crossing the canal, it is in stone and consists of a single tall elliptical arch in a deep cutting. There is a band and a coped parapet ending in square piers.	II
Walton Hall Canal Bridge, Barnsley Canal; 53.64390°N 1.45572°W		Late 18th century	The bridge carries a road over the canal, it is in stone and consists of a single horseshoe elliptical arch. There is a band and a coped parapet ending in square piers.	II
Elmwood House; 53.65278°N 1.47005°W		Late 18th century	The house is in stone with a hipped stone slate roof. There are two storeys, a symmetrical front of three bays, and three bays on the sides. In the centre of the front is a Tuscan porch, and a doorway with a fanlight. The windows are sashes, those in the ground floor recessed within segmental arches. At the rear is a doorway with monolithic jambs.	II
Barn and outbuildings southwest of Elmwood House; 53.65248°N 1.47053°W	—	Late 18th century	The barn incorporates a dovecote, and there are stables at both ends. It is in stone with quoins and a stone slate roof, hipped at the ends. There are two storeys, the barn has seven bays, the stable to the left has three bays, and that to the right has four. The barn has a tall segmental-arched cart entry, windows, and a doorway with tie-stone jambs leading to the dovecote. Each stable has external steps leading up to a hayloft, and on the right return is a lean-to with three doors.	II
Gate piers and walls, Elmwood House; 53.65267°N 1.46960°W	—	Late 18th century	The gate piers opposite the house are channelled, and have square caps and ball finials; those at the entrance to the farmyard are plainer. The wall is in stone and coped, it steps down the hill, and flanking the farmyard entrance are quadrant walls.	II
Barn and outbuildings, Rose Farm; 53.64271°N 1.46305°W	—	Late 18th century	The barn and attached outbuilding have been converted into a dwelling. The building is in stone with quoins and a stone slate hipped roof. The former barn has segmental-arched cart entries with keystones, and a doorway with monolithic jambs. The former outbuilding has three French windows, and at the junction are external steps to an upped floor doorway.	II
Walton House; 53.64730°N 1.46717°W		Late 18th century	A house that was extended in the 1i9th century, it is in stone on a plinth, with a frieze, a cornice and blocking course, and a hipped stone slate roof. There are two storeys and five bays. The middle three bays project slightly under a pediment containing a carved festoon panel in the tympanum. The bays are flanked by giant engaged Ionic columns, and the doorway has an architrave and a fanlight. The windows are sashes; those flanking the doorway are tripartite. At the rear is an open porch with ball finials, and an arched stair window.	II
Iron bridge, Walton Hall; 53.64220°N 1.45090°W		c. 1800	A footbridge providing access to Walton Hall, it is in cast iron, and consists of a single shallow arch. It has open double-sectioned framework, and at each end are gates, and stone channelled piers with chamfered coping, and railings with arrow-head finials.	II*
Sundial, Walton Hall; 53.64136°N 1.45099°W		1813	The sundial is in stone, and has a square plinth with recessed panelled sides, a carved scalloped roundel in relief, and a moulded cornice. This is surmounted by an elaborate polyhedron, and multiple copper gnomons showing the time in different parts of the world.	II
Gate piers, Walton Hall; 53.64258°N 1.45158°W		Early 19th century (probable)	The gate piers at the entrance to the car park are in channelled stone and have a square plan. Each pier has a carved frieze decorated with linked circles, and is surmounted by a base for a ball finial.	II
