= Walton, Wakefield =

Coordinates: 53.649900°N 1.460900°W

Walton
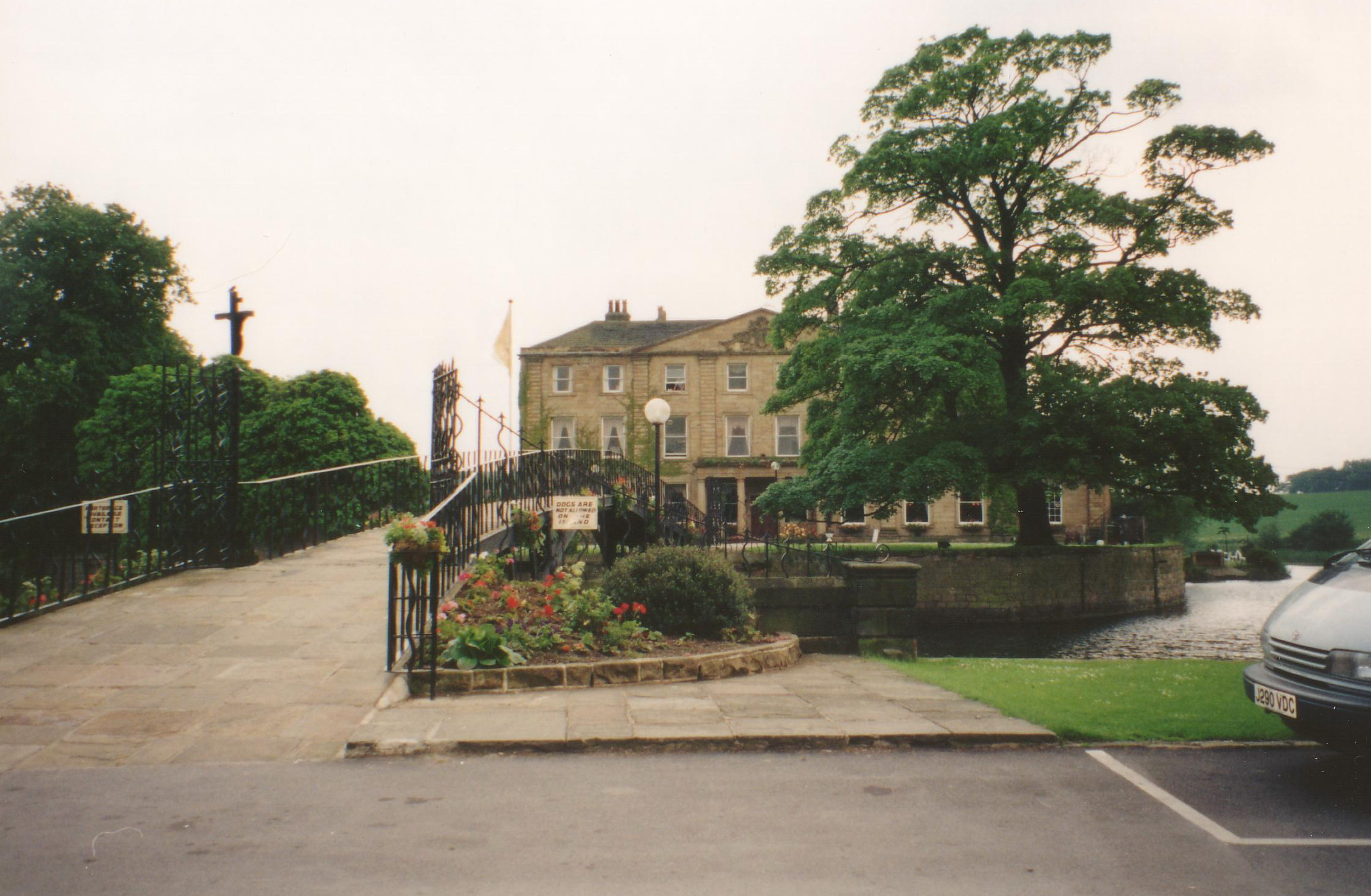
- Walton Hall, Walton

- Location within West Yorkshire
- Population: 3,231 (2011 census)
- OS grid reference: SE357171
- Civil parish: Walton
- Metropolitan borough: City of Wakefield
- Metropolitan county: West Yorkshire
- Region: Yorkshire and the Humber
- Country: England
- Sovereign state: United Kingdom
- Post town: WAKEFIELD
- Postcode district: WF2
- Police: West Yorkshire
- Fire: West Yorkshire
- Ambulance: Yorkshire
- UK Parliament: Normanton and Hemsworth

Walton is a village and civil parish in the City of Wakefield in the county of West Yorkshire, England, 4 miles south-east of Wakefield. At the time of the 2011 Census, the parish had a population of 3,231. At the time of the 2011 Census the parish was part of the City of Wakefield's ward of Crofton, Ryhill and Walton. The population of this ward at the Census was 15,144.

Historically part of the West Riding of Yorkshire, the village lies on the Barnsley Canal and is home to Walton Hall, once the residence of Charles Waterton, known as 'Squire' Waterton. He was a naturalist and explorer who, in 1820, transformed the grounds of the Walton Hall estate the world's first nature reserve. The estate is also often referred to on Ordnance Survey maps, etc., as Walton Park and, less frequently, as Walton Hall Park. More recently, it has become widely known as Waterton Park.

Walton Hall is now Waterton Park Hotel. The park is now largely given over to a golf course, also named Waterton Park. There are public rights of way crossing the park.

Nearby, the site of the now demolished Walton Colliery, formerly known as Sharlston West colliery, has been transformed into a nature park (Walton Colliery Nature Park). Large lakes were constructed when the reserve was landscaped in the mid-1990s and the excavated earth was then used to cover the colliery's vast spoil heaps. The village also contains a small park, a tennis club, football and rugby pitches, a newly renovated pub and a sports and social club.

== Name ==
The village was recorded in the Domesday Book (c. 1086) as Waleton, but from c. 650 – 830, it was known as Weala-tun, a name which means 'Welshman's Village'. This suggests a settlement of native British people was established well before the Saxons arrived during the 7th century. During the Norman dynasty, the village was recorded as Waton, but since the Middle Ages (c. 1154) to the present day, the village has held its current name of Walton.

== Schools ==
The first village school was established in the village in 1722 when two large cottages on Shay Lane were donated by Charles Waterton (grandfather of the aforementioned Squire Charles Waterton). One of the two cottages was a small schoolroom and the other was let to the newly appointed schoolmaster free of charge, providing the two poor children of the village were educated for free.

In 1790, money from the will of wealthy woman called Catherine Neville of Chevet, Wakefield was donated. These funds were used to establish a new, free school in Walton which operated alongside a few other smaller schools in the area.

In 1857 Miss. Mary Pilkington of Chevet Hall, Sandal, financed the construction of a new school, a schoolmasters house and a laundry school on School Lane. This school continued its existence until 1911, gradually taking on more pupils from the other village schools until they were deemed redundant and closed. It was closed and demolished in 1911, but replaced shortly after by another new school building for children aged 3 to 11.

As the village population grew, the new school was soon over capacity and a solution was needed. To combat this problem, a new infant school was built on The Grove, taking on all the pupils aged 3 to 8, with the pupils aged 8 to 11 remaining at the original building.

The original school closed in 2007 and the infant school was demolished when a new replacement was constructed in its place. It caters to the pupils of both the old infant school and the original school, as well as containing the new village library. The original 1911 school was finally demolished in 2009. In 2019, eight dwellings were erected on the site.

== Churches ==
Since the 19th century, there have been two places of worship for the village community. In the 1800s, the Methodist community were worshipping in a building on the Balk and in 1856 they built an additional small chapel on Shay Lane. When opened, St. Paul's Church on the Balk was dedicated to the Bishop of Wakefield, its construction was financed by the Simpson family, who also provided the land. The village is in the Church of England Parish of Sandal Magna.

In 1896, with the village population on the increase, larger premises were needed for the Methodist congregation and a bigger chapel was built. The design incorporated the original building and in 1910, extra Sunday school rooms were added.

== Colliery ==
Walton Colliery was the site of an explosion on 22 April 1959 that killed five men.

The pit closed on 3 December 1979, leading to the loss of 550 locally. This was planned to be one of the first en-bloc transfers of miners from an exhausted colliery to the new Selby Coalfield, but only around half of the workforce (excluding those that chose redundancy) moved to the Selby Coalfield. The remaining miners transferred to similar work at Ackton Hall, Allerton Bywater and Nostell Collieries immediately, and often later to Selby when those pits closed.

Before closure, Walton Colliery had been saved several times by industrial action. In 1977 it was reported to require investment of £5 million to open new faces, which was rejected by the Coal Board, but Arthur Scargill refused to accept the closure of a pit where the coal was not yet exhausted.

== War memorial ==
At the centre of the village, at the junction of School Lane (B6378) and Shay Lane, a war memorial lists the names of local men who died serving in the First and Second World Wars.

== See also ==
- Listed buildings in Walton, Wakefield
