= Watertown =

Watertown may refer to:

== Places in China ==
In China, a water town is a type of ancient scenic town known for its waterways.

== Places in the United States ==
- Watertown, Connecticut, a town
  - Watertown (CDP), Connecticut, the central village in the town
- Watertown, Florida, a census-designated place
- Watertown, Massachusetts, a city
- Watertown Township, Clinton County, Michigan, a charter township
- Watertown Township, Tuscola County, Michigan, a civil township
- Watertown Township, Sanilac County, Michigan, a civil township
- Watertown, Minnesota, a city
- Watertown Township, Minnesota
- Watertown, New York, a city
  - Watertown, New York (town), a town adjacent to the city
- Watertown Township, Washington County, Ohio, a township
  - Watertown, Ohio, an unincorporated community in the township
- Watertown, South Dakota, a city
- Watertown, Tennessee, a town
- Watertown, Wisconsin, a city
  - Watertown (town), Wisconsin, a town adjacent to the city

=== Military installations ===
- Area 51, Nevada; nicknamed "Watertown"
- Watertown Air Force Station, Maine; a USAF general surveillance radar station with an aircraft control and warning squadron
- Watertown Arsenal, Massachusetts; Formerly Used Defense Site MA19799F17770
- Watertown Bomb Plot, Maine; the callsign of a USAF Radar Bomb Scoring station on Fort Drum
- Watertown Precision Bombing Range, South Dakota; "206mi. NNW of Sioux AAB"

== Buildings ==
- Punggol Watertown, an integrated development in Singapore.
- Watertown Brand Outlet Centre (previously Harbour Town) in West Perth, Australia

== Music ==
- Watertown (album), a 1970 album by Frank Sinatra
- "Watertown", a song on the album Earth is Big (2000) by Logan Whitehurst

== See also ==
- Waterton (disambiguation)
- Víziváros (Watertown), Esztergom, Hungary
- Waterdown, Ontario, now part of the city of Hamilton
