= Richard Fleming (bishop) =

Archbishop of York-elect from 1424 to 1425

- Bishop of Lincoln
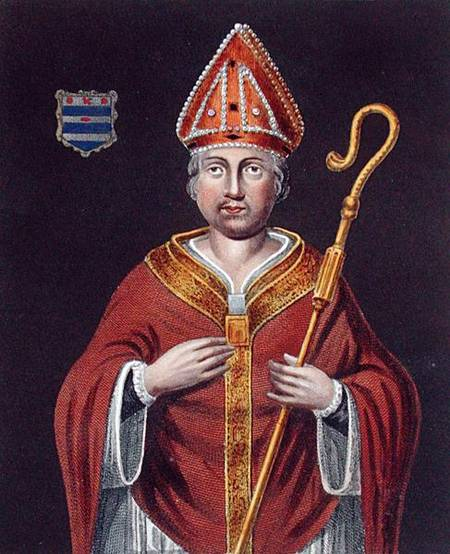
- Appointed: 20 November 1419
- Term ended: January 1431
- Predecessor: Philip Repyngdon
- Successor: William Gray

Orders
- Consecration: 28 April 1420

Personal details
- Born: c. 1385 Crofton, Wakefield, Yorkshire
- Died: 25 or 26 January 1431 Sleaford Castle
- Denomination: Roman Catholic

Richard Fleming (c. 1385 – 25 or 26 January 1431), Bishop of Lincoln and founder of Lincoln College, Oxford, was born at Crofton in Yorkshire.

== Biography ==
Fleming was descended from a gentry family. His aunt, Cecily Fleming had married Robert Waterton, 'Henry IV's esquire and right-hand man'. His nephew, Robert Flemming, was likely an illegitimate son of Robert Flemming, esquire, of Wath, near Ripon (d.1459).

Fleming was educated at University College, Oxford. Having taken his degrees, he was made prebendary of York in 1406, and the next year was junior proctor of the university. In 1409 he was appointed to the committee of twelve censors who were commissioned to examine the writings of John Wyclif and determine the heretical ideas they contained. Later that year he was accused of supporting some of Wyclif's errors in a public disputation, for which he incurred the censure of Archbishop Arundel. Fleming must have either been exonerated or renounced his supposed heresy because he was still a member of the committee of censors when its list of Wycliffe's errors was published in 1411 (Nighman, 2003, pp. 208–10).

Before 1415 Fleming was instituted to the rectory of Boston in Lincolnshire. He attended the Council of Constance from late 1416 to early 1418 where he delivered a number of sermons which survive, all of which reveal a strong concern for clerical reform (Nighman, 1997, 2000, 2003, 2008a, 2008b). He was nominated to the see of Lincoln by papal provision on 20 November 1419 and on 28 April 1420 he was consecrated as bishop of Lincoln by Martin V in Florence. He attended the Council of Pavia and Siena in 1428–1429 and, in the presence of the pope, reportedly made an eloquent speech in vindication of the rights of the English "nation" and in support of papal authority against the more radical proponents of conciliarism; this sermon apparently does not survive. It was probably on this occasion that he was named chamberlain to the pope.

In February 1424 the see of York being vacant, the pope conferred it on Fleming; but the regency council of the young king Henry VI refused to confirm the appointment, and Fleming resigned the appointment in July 1425. In 1427, Fleming obtained a royal licence empowering him to found a college at Oxford for the special purpose of training theologians to combat Wycliffe's heresy. To Bishop Fleming was entrusted the execution of the decree of the Council of Constance for the exhumation and burning of Wycliffe's remains, though Fleming delayed fulfilling this duty for over a decade. He died at Sleaford, Lincolnshire, in January 1431. Although his foundation of Lincoln College, Oxford, was incomplete at the time of his death, the college's future was eventually secured and Fleming's manuscript books became the core collection of the collegiate library (de la Mare, 1962–3).

== Citations ==
Catholic Church titles
Preceded by Philip Morgan	Archbishop of York election quashed 1424–1425	Succeeded by John Kemp
Preceded by Philip Repyngdon	Bishop of Lincoln; 1420–1431	Succeeded by William Gray
