= Mary A. Hitchcock Wakelin =

American educator and temperance reformer

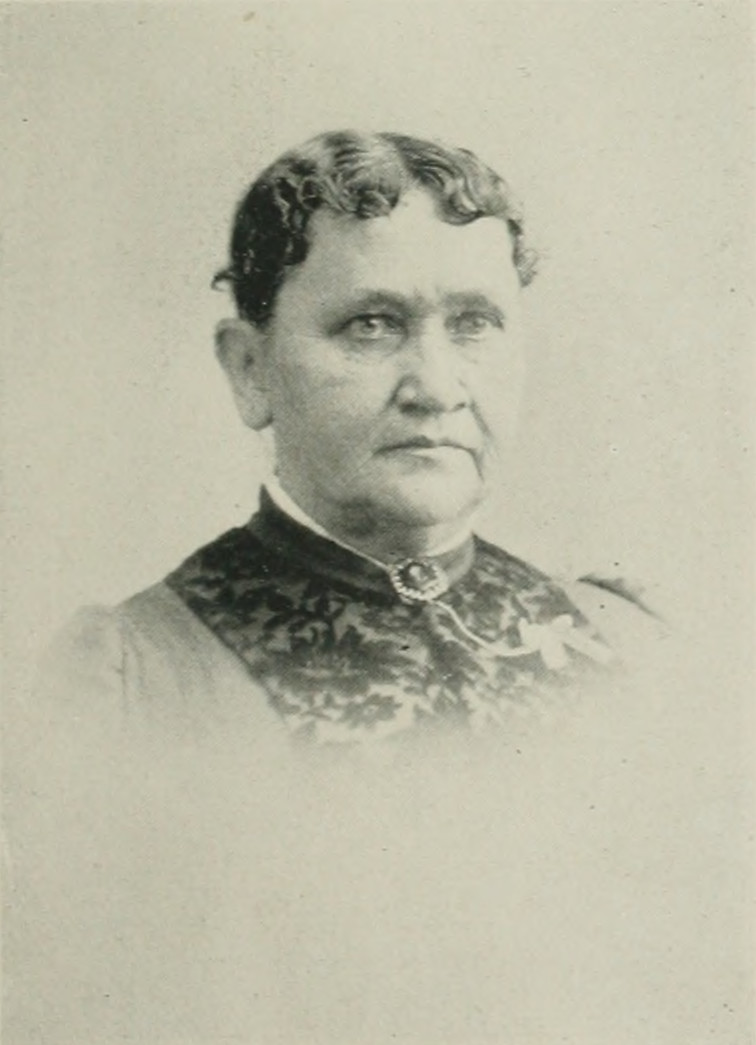
- Portrait photo from "A Woman of the Century"
- Born: Mary Antoinette Barnes; April 28, 1834; Rodman, Jefferson county, New York, U.S.
- Died: February 25, 1900 (aged 65); Fremont, Nebraska, U.S.
- Other names: Mary Antoinette Hitchcock
- Occupations: educator; temperance reformer
- Known for: President, Nebraska State Woman's Christian Temperance Union
- Spouses: Alfred Hitchcock (m. 1852–1878); Wilson Wakelin (m. 1894)

Mary A. Hitchcock Wakelin (née, Barnes; after first marriage, Hitchcock; after second marriage, Wakelin; April 28, 1834 – February 25, 1900) was a 19th-century American educator and temperance reformer. In 1874, she started the movement that resulted in the Nebraska state organization of Woman's Christian Temperance Union (WCTU), serving as State President for six years. It had been common talk for some years that Wakelin did not get along with her second husband; in 1900, he murdered her before he committed suicide.

== Early life and education ==
Mary Antoinette Barnes was born in the town of Rodman, Jefferson county, New York, April 28, 1834. She was the only daughter of Lorenzo Dow and Urrilla Barnes. When she was eleven years old, her parents moved to Greenleaf, Wisconsin, then a new region with poor educational facilities in that part of the State where they settled.

Much of her instruction was received at home, under the care of a governess, though she was also educated in the public schools of Greenleaf.

In religion, she was Baptist.

== Career ==
At the age of 16, she began to teach.

In 1852, she married Alfred Hitchcock. They had one son and one daughter.

For some time after, she continued to teach. In 1857, her husband was ordained to the ministry and became not only a teacher of the gospel, but also an advocate of temperance reform. When the Civil War occurred, they were living in Kansas, having moved to that State in 1859.

Wakelin was imbued with ultra Union and anti-slavery sentiments. She was enthusiastic for the cause and the soldier, and was ready to help out in every possible way. At that time, many of the leaders passed through their town to Osawatomie, Kansas to form the Republican Party, and she housed and fed 50 of them in one night, among them Horace Greeley, and spent the hours of the night in preparing their food for the next day.

As first assistant and county superintendent of schools, she and her husband divided Phillips County, Kansas, into school districts and started a number of schools. Afterwards removing to Fremont, Nebraska, where her husband accepted a pastorate, she became an enthusiastic member of the WCTU, and, impressed with the idea that a State organization was necessary for its lasting influence, she was in 1874 the projector of the movement that resulted in the State organization.

She subsequently removed to California, where Rev. Hitchcock died in 1878. Returning to Nebraska, she filled several positions in the WCTU, becoming State president in 1888, and holding that office for six years. Since accepting the Nebraska State presidency in 1888, she traveled continually over the State, organizing unions, attending conventions, and delivering many talks. She assisted in the great Prohibition campaign in Kansas. I

She was called to Sioux City, Iowa, on account of the death of her cousin, George G. Haddock, the circumstances of whose untimely murder at the hands of a drunken man caused general indignation and horror. Over his dead body, she promised the sorrow stricken widow to devote the remainder of her life to the eradication of alcohol, and she fulfilled her promise.

In 1894, she married Wilson Wakelin.

At the time of her death, she held the position of State superintendent of Mothers’ Meetings.

== Death ==
Mary A. Hitchcock Wakelin was murdered by her husband while she was sleeping at their home in Fremont, Nebraska, February 25, 1900. Shortly after, he committed suicide about a mile away at the cemetery where his first wife was buried. Mary had been ill for some time and was in a weakened condition physically. It had been common talk for some years that Wilson and Mary did not get along together; the couple had quarreled over the division of property, Wilson being very rich.
