= William Grey (bishop of Lincoln) =

15th-century Bishop of Lincoln and Bishop of London

- Bishop of Lincoln
- Appointed: 30 April 1431
- Term ended: February 1436
- Predecessor: Richard Fleming
- Successor: William Alnwick
- Previous post: Bishop of London

Orders
- Consecration: May 1426

Personal details
- Died: February 1436
- Denomination: Catholic

William Grey (sometimes Gray) (died February 1436) was Bishop of London and then Bishop of Lincoln.

== Family ==
William Grey was the fourth son of Sir Thomas Grey (1359 - 26 November 1400) of Heaton near Norham, Northumberland, by his wife, Joan Mowbray (d.1410), the daughter of John de Mowbray, 4th Baron Mowbray (d. 17 June 1368), and Elizabeth de Segrave, daughter and heiress of John de Segrave, 4th Baron Segrave. His paternal grandparents were Sir Thomas Grey (d. 1369) of Heaton, and Margaret, daughter and heiress of William de Presfen (or Pressen).

He had three brothers and a sister:

- Sir Thomas Grey, executed for his participation in the Southampton Plot.
- John Grey, 1st Earl of Tancarville (d.1421).
- Sir Henry Grey of Ketteringham, Norfolk, who married Emme Appleyard.
- Maud Grey (1382–1451), who married Sir Robert Ogle (d. 12 August 1436) of Ogle, Northumberland, by whom she had issue.

== Life ==
Previously the Dean of York, Grey was nominated to the see of London on 20 July 1425 and consecrated in May 1426, possibly around the 26th. He was translated to the see of Lincoln on 30 April 1431.

Grey died between 10 February and 18 February 1436.

== Citations ==
Catholic Church titles
Preceded by John Kemp	Bishop of London; 1425–1431	Succeeded by Robert FitzHugh
Preceded by Richard Fleming	Bishop of Lincoln; 1431–1436	Succeeded by William Alnwick
