= Smith-Ripley House =

Historic house in New York, United States

- U.S. National Register of Historic Places
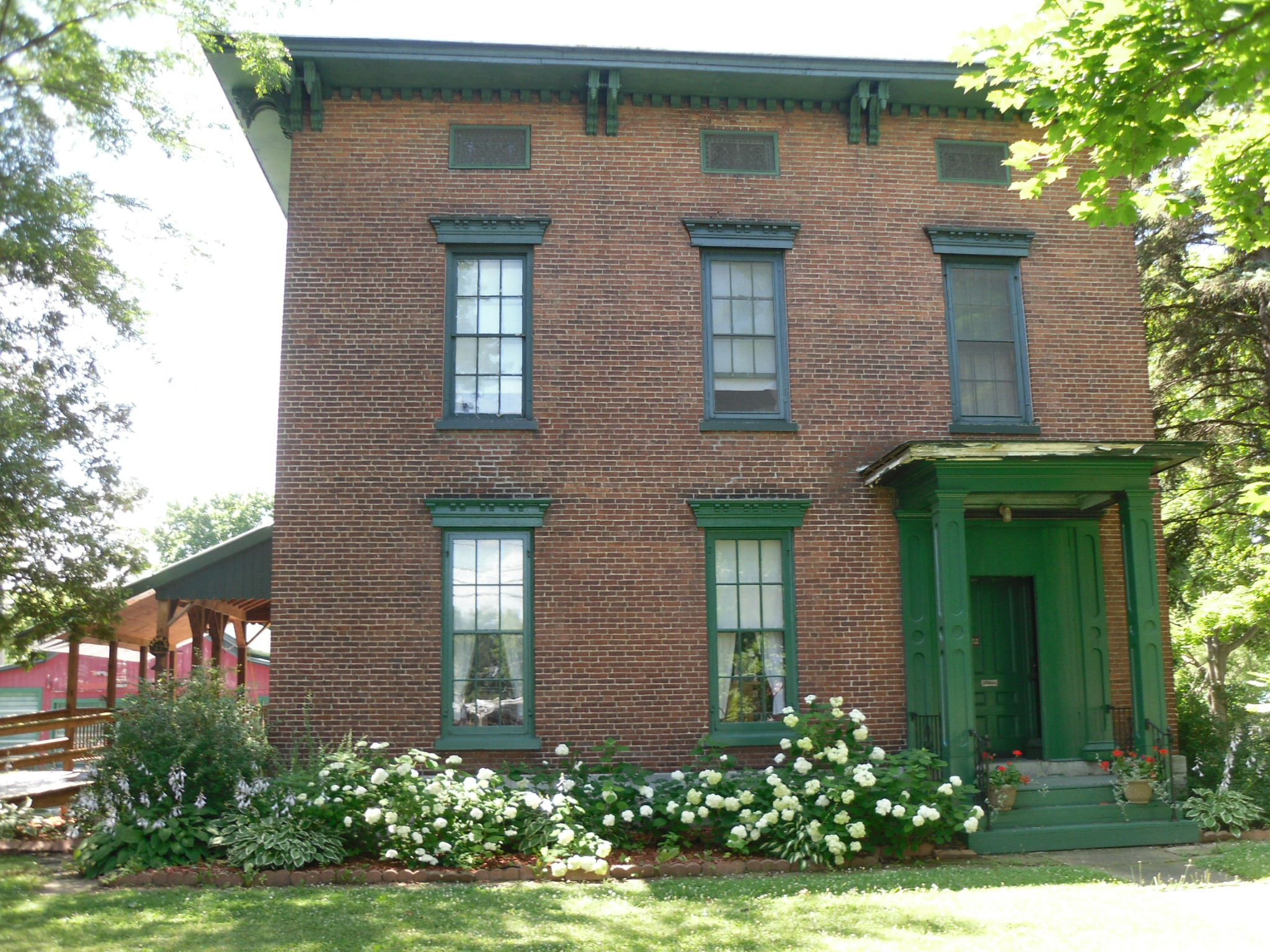
- Smith-Ripley House, July 2010

- Location within New York Location within the United States
- Interactive map showing the location for Smith-Ripley House
- Location: 29 E. Church St., Adams, New York
- Coordinates: 43°48′40″N 76°1′16″W
- Area: 3 acres (1.2 ha)
- Built: 1854
- Architectural style: Mid 19th Century Revival
- NRHP reference No.: 08000021
- Added to NRHP: February 13, 2008

Smith-Ripley House, also known as Ripley House Museum, is a historic home located at Adams in Jefferson County, New York. It was built in 1854 and is a two-story Italianate style house with an 1883 two-story addition in the southeast corner and a 1967 one story addition in the rear. Sitting on a stone foundation, the main block is three bays wide and three bays deep. The exterior is red brick construction with the exception of the wood 1967 addition. Also on the property is a carriage house dating to 1854.

It was listed on the National Register of Historic Places in 2008.
