= John Losee House =

Historic house in New York, United States

- U.S. National Register of Historic Places
- Location within New York Location within the United States
- Location: 17100 Cty. Rd. 155, Watertown, New York
- Coordinates: 43°55′01″N 75°55′47″W
- Area: 4 acres (1.6 ha)
- Built: c. 1828
- Architectural style: Federal
- NRHP reference No.: 14000004
- Added to NRHP: February 14, 2014

John Losee House is a historic home located at Watertown, Jefferson County, New York. The house was built about 1828, and is a two-story, five-bay, Federal style limestone dwelling. It has a two-story rear frame ell. It features an elliptical fanlight over the front door.

It was added to the National Register of Historic Places in 2014.
