= Adams Commercial Historic District =

Historic commercial building in New York, United States

- U.S. National Register of Historic Places
- U.S. Historic district
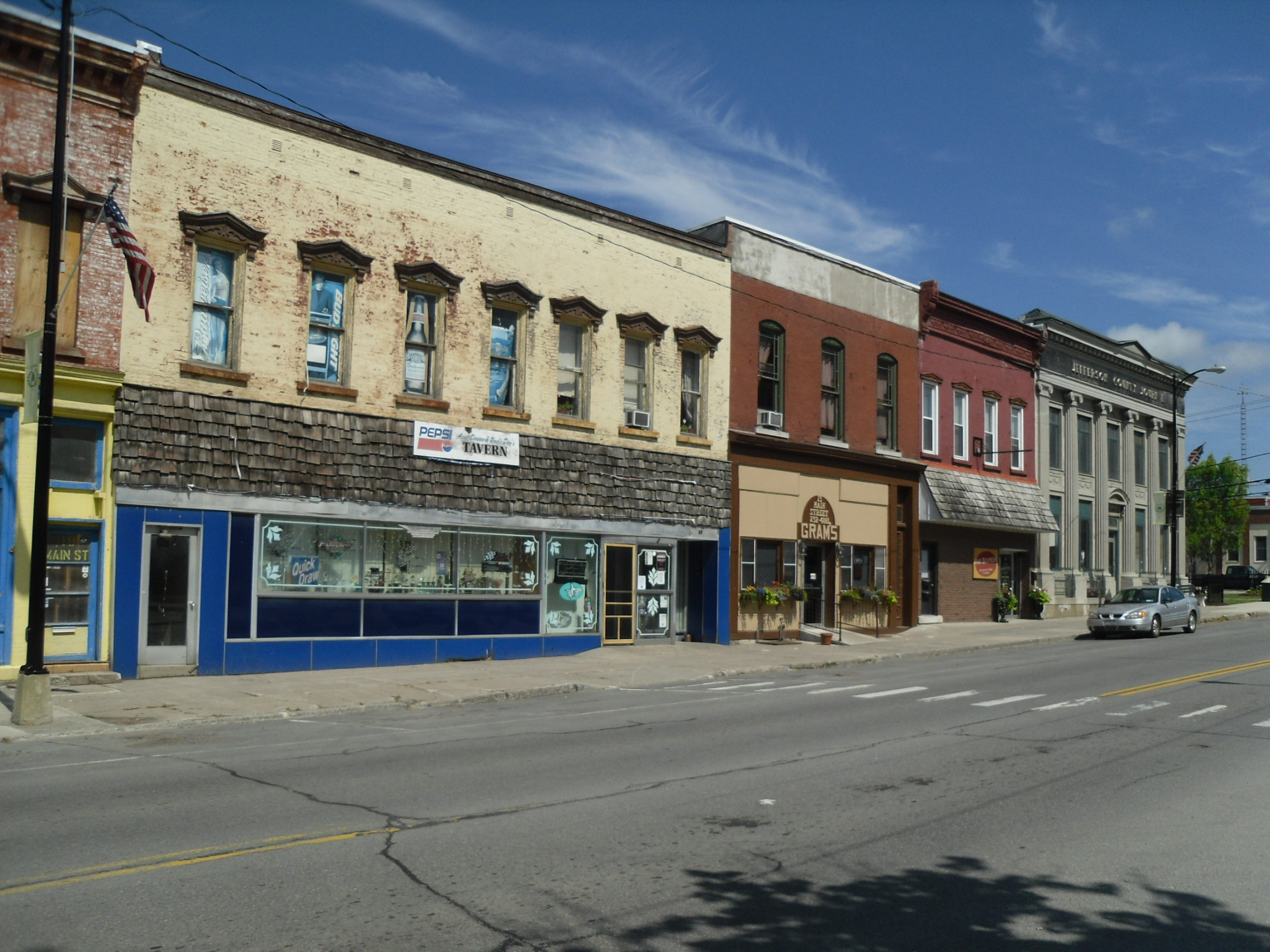
- Adams Commercial Historic District, July 2010

- Location within New York Location within the United States
- Location: Main and North Main Sts. and portions of East and West Church Sts., Adams, New York
- Coordinates: 43°48′32″N 76°1′28″W
- Area: 6 acres (2.4 ha)
- Architectural style: Classical Revival, Late Victorian
- NRHP reference No.: 06000882
- Added to NRHP: September 29, 2006

Adams Commercial Historic District is a historic district located at Adams in Jefferson County, New York. The district was listed on the National Register of Historic Places in 2006. It includes 21 contributing buildings and one contributing structure, encompassing the historic commercial core of the village of Adams.
