= Margery Baxter =

English Lollard

Margery Baxter (fl. 1429) was an outspoken Lollard from Martham, England. She was brought to trial twice and flogged at church.

== Life ==
Baxter's early life is unknown. She lived in Martham in Norfolk where her husband William Baxter was a wright. Her husband had already been convicted of heresy before she came to trial.

== Background ==
The Lollards were a fourteenth and fifteenth century Christian sect who followed the teachings of John Wycliffe, an English scholar and theologian. He had denounced corruption in the Catholic Church, which at the time held great power, and had sought to bring about reform. Wycliffe and the Lollards translated the Bible into English, and aimed to cleanse religion of corruption and excessive wealth, and to bring all Christians in to more direct contact with God. The Lollards were precursors of the Protestants in England, who flourished in following centuries. Wycliffite ideas were extremely controversial and politically dangerous, because the state and church were closely knit together.

== Teachings ==
Influenced by John Wycliffe and William White, Baxter taught controversial Lollard doctrines. She was very critical of regimented church life and spoke out against multiple church practices from Sunday worship traditions to infant baptism and the image of the crucifix. As were many Lollards, Baxter was tried for heresy in October 1428 and in 1429 as part of the Norwich Heresy Trials (1428-1431).

== Accusations and trial ==
Johanna Clifland testified against her, claiming that Baxter had expressed a variety of unorthodox sentiments, speaking out against the traditions of sanctioned marriage, fasting for religious days, and the swearing of religious oaths. Echoing foundational Lollard beliefs, Baxter also opposed the wealth of Catholic clergymen and the practice of confession to church officials.

Baxter was an admirer of her fellow Lollard Hawise Mone. She and Baxter were followers of the heretical priest William White who had been burnt at the stake in 1428 with fellow heretics Hugh Pye of Loddon and John (or William) Waddon.

Six months after Johanna Clifland made her accusations, Margery Baxter confessed in October 1428, and she was sentenced to four Sunday floggings at her parish church. two at the local marketplace and then two recants at the cathedral. She had admitted that she had smuggled and hidden White's teachings at her home and that she believed six heresies:

- only people who keep God's commandments are Christian;
- confessions to God are not required (one can rely on God's mercy);
- pilgrimages are generally not required;
- killing of any type including capital punishment are wrong;
- any good person is a priest;
- oaths are only required in a court.

She was brought to trial again in April 1429 and although the charges were serious, she believed she would escape death because she was pregnant. This was not certain, but she was not sentenced to death, and this may be because she implicated another Lollard, John Pyry from Martham.

== Sources ==
- Lynn, Staley (1994). Margery Kempe's Dissenting. Pennsylvania State University Press. ISBN 9780271040226.
- Tanner, Norman P. (2004). "Lollard women (act. c.1390–c.1520)". Oxford Dictionary of National Biography (online ed.). Oxford University Press. doi:10.1093/ref:odnb/63489. (Subscription, Wikipedia Library access or UK public library membership required.)
- Steiner, Emily (2003). "Lollard rhetoric and the written record: Margery Baxter and William Thorpe". Documentary Culture and the Making of Medieval English Literature. Cambridge University Press. p. 229. ISBN 978-0521824842.
- Doe, Penny (November 2007). "Women and Lollardy in Norwich". Norwich Heritage, Economic & Regeneration Trust. Archived from the original on April 2, 2013.
