= Hawise Mone =

English Lollard in Norfolk in the fifteenth century

- Born: married in 1428
- Died: after 1430
- Other names: sometimes Hawish Moon
- Known for: organising Lollard meetings
- Spouse: Thomas Mone
- Children: a daughter

Hawise Mone (fl. 1428–1430) was an English Lollard in Norfolk. She was brought to trial after arranging meetings that had included the heretic William White who was burnt at the stake in 1428.

== Life ==
Mone's early life is unknown. She lived in Loddon in Norfolk with her husband who was a shoemaker. They had a house and her husband took apprentices. She was a follower of a heretic named William White. Margery Baxter who was a fellow Lollard and an admirer of Mone said that she knew and understood a lot of White's teachings.

The Lollard's believed that men and women could preach and that marriage was something that the established church did not need to get involved with. Mone was a leader of the group and she appeared to be more important than her husband. She organised what was called "schools or heresy" at her home where the attendance included herself, her daughter and three men who had or who were working with her husband. The leaders of these meetings included the Lollard heretic William White.

William White was burnt at the stake in 1428 with fellow heretics Hugh Pye of Loddon and John (or William) Waddon.

In April 1429 Mone's husband's servant John Burrel appeared in court to answer charges of heresy before the bishop and his theological advisors. He was keen to implicate others including his sister in law Matilda, Thomas, his brother and notably his employer. This trial was one of sixty that the clerk John of Exeter recorded. It was the clerk's task to summarise statements so that they could be judged for heresy. All of the heresies would be listed so that the person could return and recant then later. Generally women lollards were dealt with more leniently and their heresies were not itemised, however Mone was the exception requesting an itemised list.

Mone was accused of breaking the fast of Lent on purpose. She had organised a meal which included pork on the day before Easter Sunday. Her husband was not at home when the meal took place which illustrated her independence.
