= Edmund Waterton =

British antiquary

Edmund Waterton, (1830–1887), Knight of the Supreme Order of Christ; Knight of Malta; Papal Privy Chamberlain; Fellow of the Society of Antiquaries was a British antiquary. Born at Walton Hall, West Yorkshire, the only child of Charles Waterton, he was a lifelong Catholic and was educated at Stonyhurst College.

In 1862 he married Josephine Ennis, daughter of an Irish MP. He was declared bankrupt in 1876 and was obliged to sell Walton Hall. After being widowed he remarried, in 1881, with Ellen Mercer.

Waterton's collection of rings is now partly in the Victoria and Albert Museum; his collection of editions of The Imitation of Christ is now the core of the Edmund Waterton Collection in the British Library.

== Publications ==
- "On a Remarkable Incident in the Life of St Edward the Confessor", Archaeological Journal 21 (1864), pp. 103–113.
- Catalogue of the very extensive and valuable collection of antique and mediaeval rings, formed by that well-known collector, E. Waterton, etc. London: W. Clowes, [1868?].
- Edmund Waterton, Pietas Mariana Britannica: A History of English Devotion to the Most Blessed Virgin Mary Mother of God, with a Catalogue of Shrines, Sanctuaries, Offerings, Bequests, and Other Memorials of the Piety of Our Forefathers. London 1879. Available on Internet Archive.
