= Robert Waterton =

Servant of the House of Lancaster

- Born: c. 1360
- Died: 17 January 1425 (aged 64–65); Methley, Yorkshire
- Buried: Methley, Yorkshire
- Spouse: Cecily Fleming
- Issue: Robert Waterton, Jane Waterton
- Father: John Waterton
- Mother: Joan Mauley

Robert Waterton (c. 1360 – 17 January 1425) was a trusted servant of the House of Lancaster under three monarchs, Henry IV, Henry V, and Henry VI. As Constable of Pontefract Castle, he had custody of Richard II after that king was deposed.

== Family ==
Robert Waterton, likely born circa 1360, was the son of John Waterton of Waterton, Lincolnshire and Joan, daughter of Peter de Mauley, 2nd Baron Mauley. He had a brother, John Waterton, and was a nephew of Sir Hugh Waterton.

== Career ==
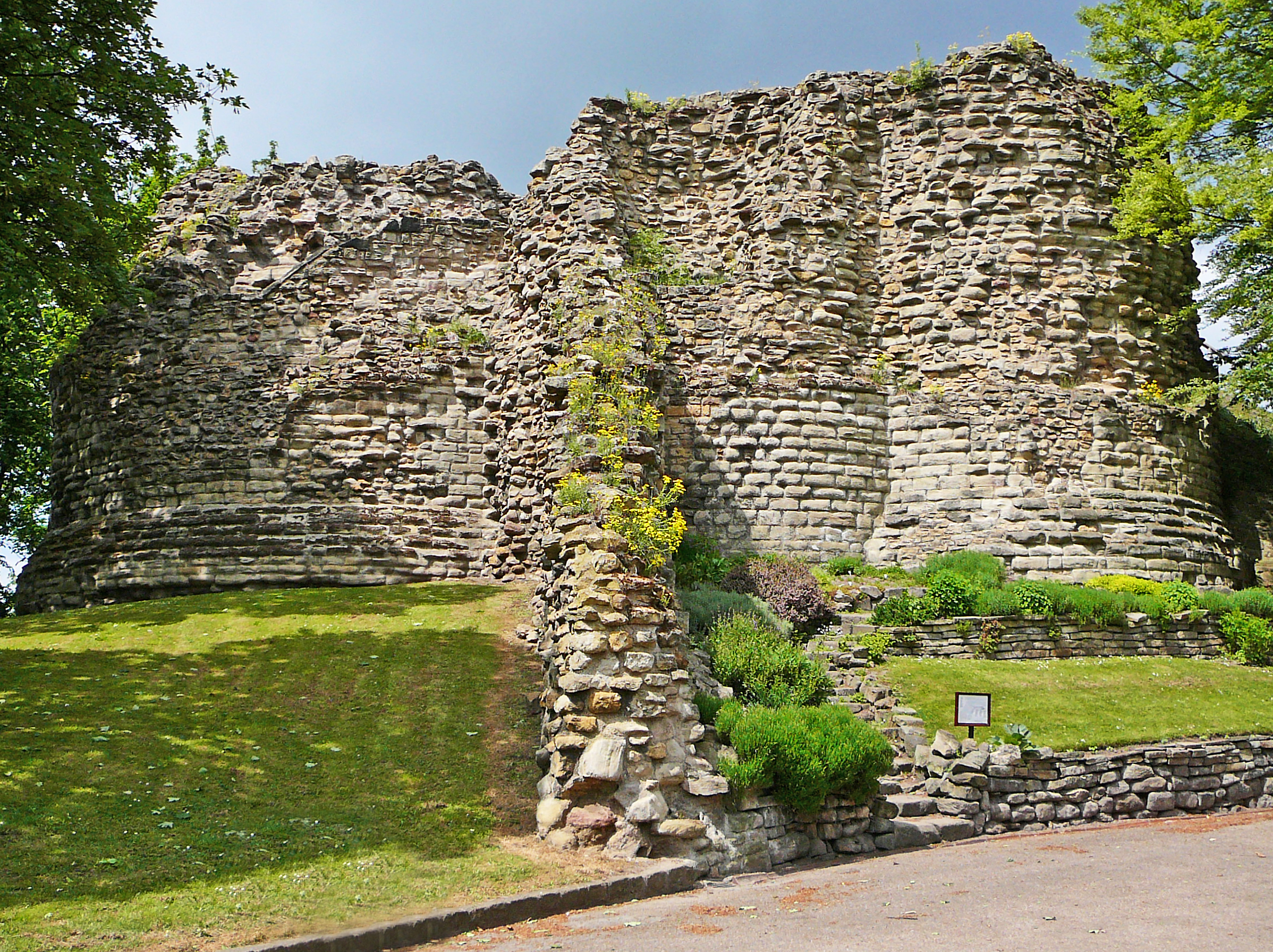
Ruins of Pontefract Castle, where Robert Waterton was Constable

Like his uncle Sir Hugh Waterton, he entered the service of Henry Bolingbroke, the future Henry IV. In 1391 he was appointed Master Forester at Pontefract Castle, and in that year accompanied Bolingbroke to the siege of Vilnius. He was with Bolingbroke when he returned to Vilnius in the following year. From 1392 he received a yearly fee from Bolingbroke of £6 13s 4d, and in 1398 Bolingbroke granted him an additional annuity of 10 marks. In 1399 he was Steward and Constable at Pontefract, as well as Constable at Tickhill Castle and Castle Donington, positions which 'made him a dominant figure in the West Riding of Yorkshire and in north Nottinghamshire'. He remained in these posts despite Richard II's confiscation of Bolingbroke's estates after the death of John of Gaunt in 1399. In June of that year Waterton was among the first of Bolingbroke's retainers to join him at Ravenspur, where he arrived with two hundred foresters, although according to a speech by the Earl of Northumberland in Shakespeare's Richard II (Act II, scene i), Waterton was among those who sailed with Bolingbroke from the continent:

Then thus: I have from Port le Blanc, a bay
In Brittany, received intelligence
That Harry Duke of Hereford, Rainold Lord Cobham,
That late broke from the Duke of Exeter,
His brother, Archbishop late of Canterbury,
Sir Thomas Erpingham, Sir John Ramston,
Sir John Norbery, Sir Robert Waterton and Francis Quoint,
All these well furnish'd by the Duke of Bretagne
With eight tall ships, three thousand men of war,
Are making hither with all due expedience
And shortly mean to touch our northern shore.

Bolingbroke was crowned as Henry IV on 13 October 1399, and on 20 November Waterton was appointed his Master of Horse. In 1401–2 he was sent on embassies to Germany and Denmark. On 28 November 1399 he was granted the manor of Doubledyke in Gosberton, Lincolnshire which had been forfeited by Sir John Bushy or Bussy.

In January 1400 Waterton was one of those given custody of the former King, Richard II, at Pontefract. In 1404 he openly in Parliament rejected claims that Richard was still alive.

With the outbreak of civil war in 1403, Waterton was instrumental in preventing the forces of Henry Percy, 1st Earl of Northumberland, from joining those of his son, Henry Percy (Hotspur). Waterton then marched with Henry IV's army against Northumberland at Newcastle upon Tyne, and was later sent to arrest both Hotspur's widow and son. He was rewarded in August 1403 with the grant for life of a manor in Northumberland and lands in Yorkshire; both grants were later confirmed to him and his heirs. In the spring of 1405 Henry IV entrusted him with the delivery of a message to Northumberland. Northumberland imprisoned him at Warkworth Castle on 6 May, but released him in June, his place as prisoner being taken by his brother, John Waterton. He was later made Steward and Master Forester of two of the Percy estates.

On 18 May 1407 the King appointed him chief steward of the north parts of the Duchy of Lancaster. In April 1408 he was involved in negotiations with ambassadors from France and in restoring order after Northumberland's last rebellion. In 1411 he was elected Sheriff of Lincolnshire. He was a witness to Henry IV's will, in which he was appointed as one of the King's executors.

His chief stewardship of the Duchy of Lancaster was not renewed by Henry V, and his relationship with Henry V was generally not as close as it had been with Henry IV, although he was sent on embassies to France in 1414 and 1416, and was given custody of the young Richard, 3rd Duke of York, from 1415 to 1423. From June 1417 an important French prisoner, Charles, Duke of Orléans, was in his charge at Pontefract; Henry V viewed with suspicion the friendship which developed between Waterton and the Duke, and had the latter moved to Windsor Castle.

At Henry VI's accession on 31 August 1422, Waterton was reappointed to his offices at Pontefract and Tickhill. In 1424 he had charge for a time of Scottish hostages, including James I of Scotland.

Waterton acquired considerable property, including a grant in 1412 from Henry IV's second wife, Joan of Navarre, of a manor at Healaugh which had formerly belonged to the Percys. In 1410, he exchanged his manor of Gosberton (Gosberkirke) in the south of Lincolnshire, with the Master of the Hospital of St. Nicholas in Pontefract for the Manor of Methley, where he built his fine manor house. This was the location of a royal Lodge, and from here Waterton addressed his letter to Henry V on the eve of his marriage in 1420.

He made his will on 10 January 1425, and died at Methley on 17 January. He was buried in the Waterton chapel in St Oswald's parish church with this epitaph:

Pray for the soul of Robert Waterton & Cecily his wife,
That God will take to his kingdom their poor & endless life.

His arms, displayed on his alabaster effigial monument, were Barry of six, Ermine and Gules, over all three crescents sable.

== Marriages and issue ==
Robert Waterton married, Cecily, daughter of Sir Robert Fleming of Woodhall, sister of Richard Fleming, Bishop of Lincoln, and aunt of Robert Flemming, Dean of Lincoln (1416–1483), by whom he had a son and daughter:

- Sir Robert Waterton (I) [see below],
- Joan (Jane) or Cecily Waterton, who married Lionel de Welles, 6th Baron Welles, by whom she had a son and four daughters.

His son, Sir Robert Waterton (I) married firstly, by 1398, Joan Everingham (born 1362), widow of Sir William Elys (d. 1391), and daughter and coheir of Sir William Everingham (d. August 1369 v.p.) of Skinningrove by Alice, daughter of John Grey, 3rd Baron Grey of Codnor (d. 1392) and of her grandfather, Adam de Everingham 2nd Baron Everingham of Laxton (cr. 4 March 1309). By her first husband, Joan Everingham had one son, Robert Elys. By Sir Robert Waterton, she had a further son Sir Robert Waterton (II).

Sir Robert Waterton (I) married secondly, by 1422, Margaret Clarell (a Lady of the Garter), widow of Sir John Fitzwilliam (d. 17 September 1421) of Sprotborough, Yorkshire, son and heir of Sir John Fitzwilliam (d. 5 July 1417) by Eleanor Greene, daughter of Sir Henry Greene. Margaret Clarell was the daughter of Thomas Clarell, esquire, of Aldwarke (near Rawmarsh), by Maud Montgomery, daughter of Sir Nicholas Montgomery (d. 1424) of Cubley, Derbyshire.

By her first husband, Margaret Clarell had two sons, Sir William Fitzwilliam, who married Elizabeth Chaworth, and John Fitzwilliam, and a daughter, Eleanor Fitzwilliam, who married Sir William Ryther. After Robert Waterton's death, Margaret Clarell contracted a clandestine marriage, on 7 February 1426, to Sir William Gascoigne (c.1405 – before March 1454) of Gawthorpe, Yorkshire, grandson of William Gascoigne, Chief Justice of England, by whom she had four sons and five daughters.

Sir Robert Waterton (II) (b. 1408), was knighted in 1434 and was High Sheriff of Yorkshire in 1441, married firstly, Jane, daughter of John Meeres of Kirton-in-Lindsey, Lincs., by whom he had a son Sir Thomas Waterton. He married secondly, Beatrix, daughter of John Clifford, 7th Baron de Clifford, slain at the Siege of Meaux in 1422. Sir Robert Waterton (II) died on 13 December 1476 (ipm: Wentbridge 26 April 1477).
