= Charles Waterton =

English naturalist and explorer (1782–1865)

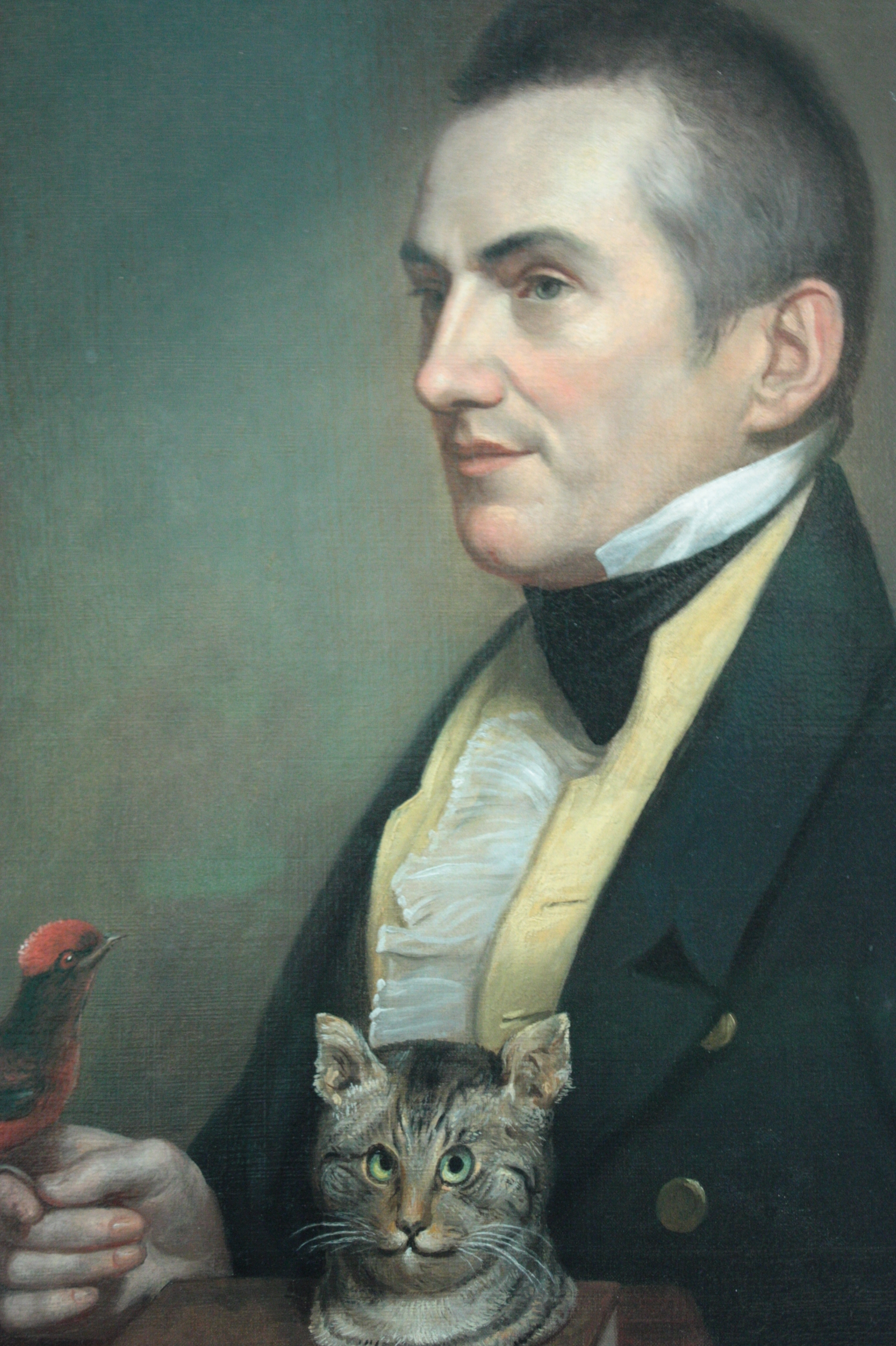
- Born: 3 June 1782; Walton, Wakefield, England
- Died: 27 May 1865 (aged 82); Walton, Wakefield, England
- Burial place: Walton Hall
- Monuments: Waterton Lake, Canada; Waterton River, Canada
- Education: Stonyhurst College
- Occupations: naturalist; explorer; environmentalist; taxidermist; plantation overseer
- Children: Edmund Waterton

Charles Waterton (3 June 1782 – 27 May 1865) was an English naturalist, plantation overseer and explorer best known for his pioneering work regarding conservation.

== Family and religion ==
Waterton was of a Roman Catholic landed gentry family descended from Reiner de Waterton and Thomas More. The Watertons had remained Catholic after the English Reformation and consequently the vast majority of their estates were confiscated. Charles Waterton himself was a devout and ascetic Catholic, and maintained strong links with the Vatican.

"Squire" Waterton was born at Walton Hall, Wakefield, Yorkshire, to Thomas Waterton and Anne Bedingfield.

He was educated at Stonyhurst College in Lancashire where his interest in exploration and wildlife were already evident. On one occasion Waterton was caught by the school's Jesuit Superior scaling the towers at the front of the building; almost at the top, the Superior ordered him to come down the way he had gone up. Waterton records in his autobiography that while he was at the school:

By a mutual understanding, I was considered rat-catcher to the establishment, and also fox-taker, foumart-killer, and cross-bow charger at the time when the young rooks were fledged. ... I followed up my calling with great success. The vermin disappeared by the dozen; the books were moderately well-thumbed; and according to my notion of things, all went on perfectly right.

== South America ==
In 1804 he travelled to British Guiana to take charge of his uncle's slave plantations near Georgetown. In 1812 he started to explore the hinterland of the colony, making four journeys between then and 1824, and reaching Brazil walking barefoot in the rainy season. He described his discoveries in his book Waterton's Wanderings in South America, which inspired British schoolboys such as Charles Darwin and Alfred Russel Wallace. His explorations laid to rest the persistent myth of Raleigh's Lake Parime by suggesting that the seasonal flooding of the Rupununi savannah had been misidentified as a lake.

Waterton was a skilled taxidermist and preserved many of the animals he encountered on his expeditions. He employed a unique method of taxidermy, soaking the specimens in what he called "sublimate of mercury". Unlike many preserved ("stuffed") animals, his specimens are hollow and lifelike. He also displayed his anarchic sense of humour in some of his taxidermy: one tableau he created (now lost) consisted of reptiles dressed as famous English Protestants and entitled "The English Reformation Zoologically Demonstrated". Another specimen was the bottom of a howler monkey which he turned into an almost human face and simply labelled "The Nondescript". This specimen is still on display at the Wakefield Museum, along with other items from Waterton's collection.

While he was in British Guiana Waterton taught his skills to one of his uncle's slaves, John Edmonstone. Edmonstone, by then freed and practising taxidermy in Edinburgh, in turn taught the teenage Darwin.

Waterton is credited with bringing the anaesthetic agent wourali (curare) to Europe.

== Walton Hall ==
In the 1820s Waterton returned to Walton Hall and built a nine-foot-high wall around three miles (5 km) of the estate, turning it into the world's first wildfowl and nature reserve, making him one of the world's first environmentalists. He also invented the bird nesting box. The Waterton Collection, on display at Stonyhurst College until 1966, is now in the Wakefield Museum. Waterton owned a dog who was prominent in the foundation of the modern English Mastiff and may be traced back to in the pedigrees of all living dogs of this breed. Waterton was voted as an honorary member of the Yorkshire Philosophical Society in its founding year of 1822.

On 11 May 1829, at the age of 47, Waterton married 17-year-old Anne Edmonstone, the granddaughter of an Arawak Native. His wife died shortly after giving birth to their son, Edmund, when she was only 18. After her death he slept on the floor with a block of wood for a pillow, "as self-inflicted penance for her soul!"

Waterton was an early opponent of pollution. He fought a long-running court case against the owners of a soap works that had been set up near his estate in 1839, and sent out poisonous chemicals that severely damaged the trees in the park and polluted the lake. He was eventually successful in having the soap works moved.

Waterton died in May 1865, after fracturing his ribs and injuring his liver in a fall on his estate. His coffin was taken from the hall by barge to his chosen resting place, near the spot where the accident happened, in a funeral cortege led by the Bishop of Beverley, and followed at the lakeside by many local people. The grave was between two oak trees, which are no longer there.

== Legacy ==
Waterton is chiefly remembered for his association with curare, and for his writings on natural history and conservation. David Attenborough has described him as "one of the first people anywhere to recognise, not only that the natural world was of great importance, but that it needed protection as humanity made more and more demands on it".

Waterton's house, Walton Hall, which may be approached only by a pedestrian bridge to its own island, is now the main building of a hotel. There is a golf course in the vicinity and various public footpaths, some leading to a nature reserve, Anglers Country Park. In 2024, Waterton Park was registered at Grade II by Historic England, to protect the landscape which Waterton designed to protect wildlife and is considered the world's first nature reserve.

Waterton Lakes in Alberta, Canada, now a national park, was named after him by Thomas Blakiston in 1858. A road and school in Wakefield, Yorkshire, are also named after him.

Waterton was a slave owner, although later wrote: "Slavery can never be defended: he whose heart is not of iron can never wish to be able to defend it."

== Bibliography ==
- Waterton, Charles (1825). Wanderings in South America, the North-West of the United States, and the Antilles, in the years 1812, 1816, 1820 and 1824: with original instructions for the perfect preservation of birds, &c. for Cabinets of Natural History. London: Printed for J. Mawman.
  - 2nd edition 1828. London: Printed for B. Fellowes
  - 5th edition 1852. London: B. Fellowes
  - edition 1882, ed. Rev. J.G. Wood. London: MacMillan and Co. With a biographical introduction by J.G. Wood
  - edition 1887. New York: Cassell & Co. Ltd. With an introduction by Norman Moore, M.D. (pp. 5–34)
  - edition 1925. London / New York: J.M. Dent & Sons, Ltd. / E.P. Dutton & Co. Inc. (Everyman Library edition). With an introduction by Edmund Selous
- —— (1838). Essays on natural history, chiefly ornithology: With an autobiography of the author, and a view of Walton Hall. London: Longman, Orme, Brown, Green, & Longmans.
  - 3rd edition 1839. London: Longman, Orme, Brown, Green & Longmans
  - 5th edition 1844. London: Longman, Brown, Green & Longmans
- —— (1844). Essays on natural history, chiefly ornithology: 2nd series. With a continuation of the autobiography of the author. London: Longman, Brown, Green, & Longmans.
