= Walton Hall, West Yorkshire =

House in Walton, Wakefield, West Yorkshire, England

Walton Hall
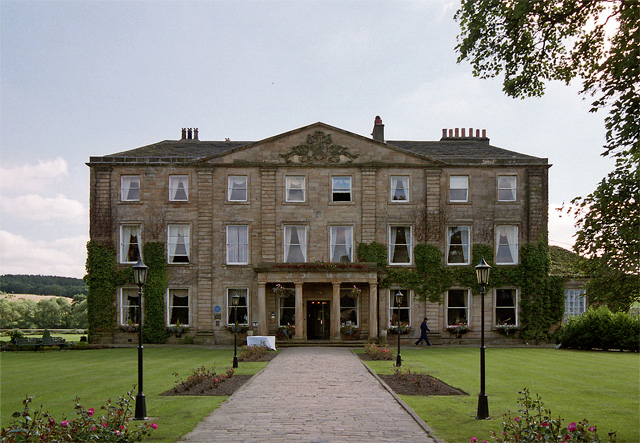

- Location within West Yorkshire
- 53°38′31.2″N 1°27′3.6″W
- Location: West Yorkshire, England
- OS grid reference: SE 36377 16255

History
- Built: c. 1767

Site notes
- Architectural style: Palladian architecture

Listed Building – Grade II*
- Official name: Walton Hall
- Designated: 11 April 1973
- Reference no.: 1135579

National Register of Historic Parks and Gardens
- Official name: Waterton Park, Walton, Wakefield
- Designated: 7 March 2024
- Reference no.: 1487471

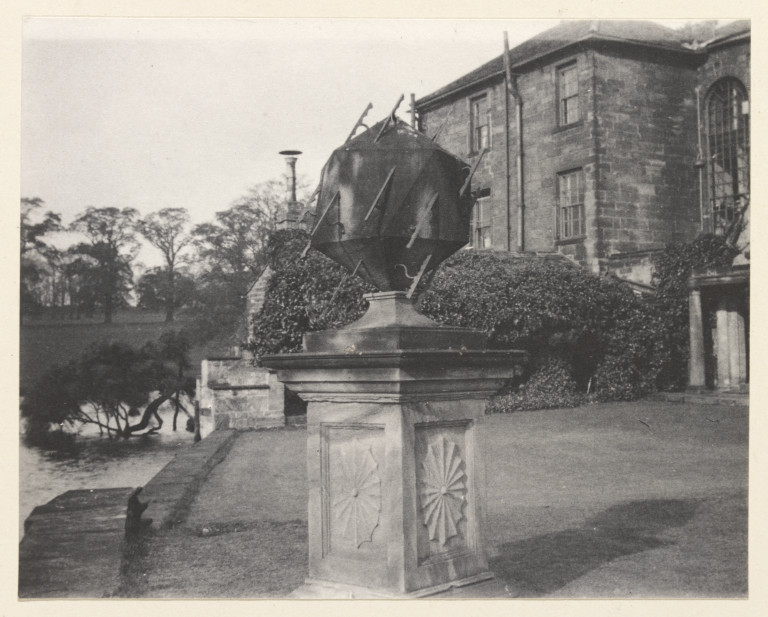
The Boulby sundial in the grounds

Walton Hall is a country house in Walton near Wakefield in West Yorkshire, England. It was built on the site of a former moated medieval hall in the Palladian style in 1767 on an island in a 26-acre (11 ha) lake. It was the ancestral home of the naturalist and traveller Charles Waterton, who made Walton Hall into the world's first wildfowl and nature reserve.

== Early history ==
Walton Hall, and a residence at Cawthorne, were home to the Anglo-Saxon chieftain Ailric, who is mentioned in the Domesday Book and was the King's Thane for the south of the West Riding of Yorkshire. When the Normans came to Yorkshire, Ailric was at Walton and was alerted by a man on horseback that they were coming in force. He amassed his retainers and on horseback they ambushed the mounted Norman knights of Ilbert de Laci, who were moving on the road from Tanshelf to Wakefield. The better armoured and armed knights of Ilbert de Laci resisted the attack. For two to three years Ailric maintained a guerrilla war out of his estates in the south of the West Riding of Yorkshire, until de Laci was forced to come to an accommodation with him, whereby Ailric would communicate with the local people and de Laci would return many of his former estates, including Walton Hall.

A descendant of this family, Sara le Neville, married Thomas De Burgh, the Steward of the Countess of Brittany, Duchess of Richmond. Walton Hall was one of six manors, including the manors at Silkstone and Cawthorne and the De Burgh manors in North Yorkshire, that she lived at through the year. In 1333, Sir Philip de Burgh was granted a licence to crenellate his manor house at Walton.

The Waterton family acquired the Cawthorne estates and those at Walton including Walton Hall, with the marriage in 1435 of Constance Asshenhull, the heiress of the De Burgh family, to Richard Waterton.

In the time of Sir Robert Waterton, who served Henry VIII, the hall came to the water's edge and was three storeys high. Sir Robert Waterton's father-in-law was Sir Richard Tempest, who was with Henry VIII at the Field of the Cloth of Gold. His father-in-law was Steward of the King's manor of Wakefield and involved in the Tempest–Saville feud. The only part of the old buildings that remain is the old watergate, which is said to be part of an earlier 14th-century structure. At that time it was the only entrance across a drawbridge. The old oak hall referred to by Charles Waterton was on the second storey and was in an L shape.

The entrance hall at Walton Hall has armorial shields on the walls representing the ancestors of the Waterton family. The Waterton family intermarried with other prominent Yorkshire families of the medieval age, including the Percys, the Barnbys, the Wentworths, the Hildyards and others.

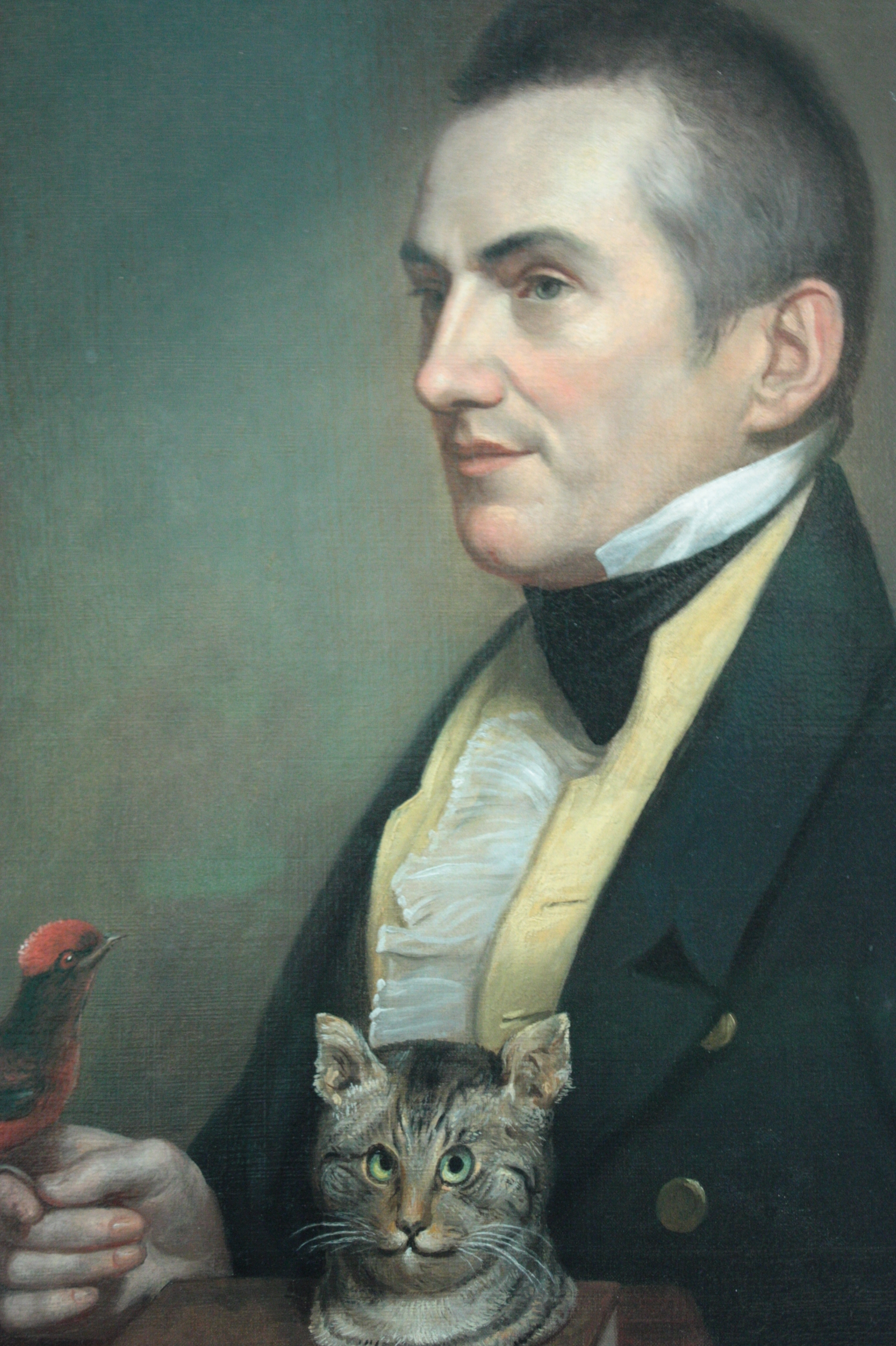
Charles Waterton by Charles Willson Peale, 1824, National Gallery, London

== World's first nature reserve ==
In 1805, Charles Waterton inherited the family estate at Walton Hall. He initially returned there in 1813 and settled more permanently in 1821 after returning from exploring and managing his uncle' slave plantations in British Guiana. Unusually for the time he was committed to nature conservation rather than hunting and game shooting for sport, which caused significant loss of native fauna. Between 1821 and 1826, he turned Waterton Park into a wildlife haven, designed to support and protect native and migratory species, especially birds.

He insisted that the park be managed to minimise the disturbance to native wildlife. Keepers and dogs from nearby estates were banned during nesting season, shooting was forbidden and lake fishing was not allowed from autumn to May. He had a high boundary wall built, over 3 miles long and designed to deter foxes and poachers, that took five years to complete. He enjoyed observing wildlife and had watchtowers built so he could birdwatch.

He opened the park to the public for free to encourage people to enjoy nature. This included patients from mental asylums whose visits to spend time in nature formed part of their treatments. The parkland is now considered the first wildlife reserve, a landscape designed to protect wildlife.

== Later history ==
Charles Waterton's son, Edmund, went bankrupt and sold the estate. The Waterton Collection is in Wakefield Museum.

Walton Hall is now part of the Waterton Park Hotel. In the 1940s and again in the early 1950s and early 1960s the Hall was a maternity home.

Walton Hall is a proposed UNESCO World Heritage Site. Sir David Attenborough has stated that "Walton Hall is an extremely important site in the history of nature conservation worldwide. It is, arguably, the first tract of land anywhere in modern times to be protected, guarded and maintained as a nature reserve."

In 2024, Waterton Park, part of the estate, was registered at Grade II by Historic England, to ensure that the landscape considered "the world’s first nature reserve" is given greater protection and recognition.

== Walton Hall sundial ==
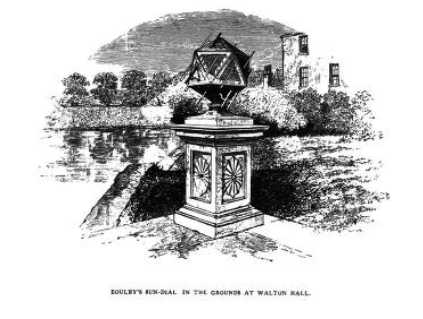
Illustration of the sundial, 1867

There is a sundial located on the island to the rear of Walton Hall. It was made by George Boulby in 1813 and is made out of an ashlar with copper gnomons. It is a multi-faceted sundial made out of a polyhedron. It indicates the time in the following cities around the world: Amsterdam, Basel, Boston, Demerara, Madras, Madrid, Mexico City, Moscow, Beijing, Philadelphia, Rome, and Warsaw. It was described by Richard Hobson:

"On the southern side of the mansion, on a slightly elevated mound, stands a most complete and very beautiful sun-dial, deserving of careful observation, inasmuch as it reflects a great credit on the sculptor, the late George Boulby, who was a common mason at the contiguous and rural village of Crofton, in 1813. A work of art, and, especially when it was well known to have been executed by a totally uneducated man – by a common mason, not only devoid of inculcated literary attainments, but by one having had no guiding artistic instruction – by a man having to earn, 'by the sweat of his brow', the few shillings sufficient to enable him to secure some of the works of the philosopher of Athens – by one having to entirely depend upon self counsel so as to elevate him in his financial and social position. I venture to say, considering all these formidable disadvantages and impediments, that this specimen of sculpture is a wonderful development of innate talent, and must be admired and applauded, for generations in futurity, as a relic of the excellence of the scientific execution of the common stone mason.

"This dial is composed of twenty equilateral triangles, which are so disposed as to form a similar number of individual dials, ten of which, whenever the sun shines out, and whatever may be its altitude in the heavens, are always in use, and ever faithful time-keepers. On these separate dials are engraven, severally, the names of cities in all parts of the globe, which are placed in accordance with their different degrees of longitude, by which arrangement, the solar time, at each of the cities recorded on the different dials, can be simultaneously ascertained.

"On one occasion Mr. Waterton, having to pass Boulby's house ... saw this dial in the stonemason's yard, for which Boulby asked a mere trifle. The Squire, delighted with the execution and the ingenuity of this simple-minded man, generously presented Boulby with twenty guineas by way of purchase, when the ingenuous and unaffected mason was infinitely more delighted to have the honour of his own artistic skills exhibited at Walton Hall, under the patronage of the Squire, than with the douceur which the sculptor erroneously considered far beyond its value"

Charles Waterton: His Home, Habits and Handiwork. Reminiscences of an Intimate and Most Confiding Personal Association for Nearly Thirty Years, by Richard Hobson MD. (1866/7)

== See also ==
- Listed buildings in Walton, Wakefield
