= South Jefferson Central School District =

School district in New York, United States

Address
- 13180 US Route 11 Adams Center, New York 13606; United States

District information
- Motto: Spartan Pride
- Grades: PK-12
- Established: 1880
- Superintendent: Christina Chamberlain
- Schools: 2 elementary, 1 middle, 1 high
- Budget: $45 million

Students and staff
- Enrollment: 1835
- Athletic conference: Frontier League
- District mascot: Spartan
- Colors: Black and Gold

Other information
- Website: https://www.spartanpride.org/

South Jefferson Central School District is a public school district located in Jefferson County, New York. It spans over 200 square miles and has a current enrollment of approximately 1,800 students aged PK-12. The district consists of two elementary schools, one middle school, and one high school.

== Schools ==
Secondary

- South Jefferson High School
- South Jefferson Middle School

Primary

- Maynard P. Wilson Elementary School
- Mannsville Elementary

The South Jefferson Middle and High School operate in different parts of one combined building, the Clarke Building. Their separation is typically indicated by the color of the floors, walls, and ceiling.

== History ==
The South Jefferson district was established in 1880 as one of the first in Jefferson County, enrolling 682 students in the Town of Adams. In the following century, the district came to encompass school buildings in Adams Center and Mannsville as well. South Jefferson's proximity to and inclusion of the Tug Hill Plateau makes it highly prone to lake-effect snow.
