= Adams (village), New York =

Adams, New York
- Village
- Location within New York Location within the United States
- Coordinates: 43°48′33″N 76°1′26″W
- Country: United States
- State: New York
- County: Jefferson
- Town: Adams

Government
  - Mayor: Thomas Ross

Area
  - Total: 1.44 sq mi (3.74 km^{2})
  - Land: 1.44 sq mi (3.74 km^{2})
  - Water: 0 sq mi (0.00 km^{2})
- Elevation: 614 ft (187 m)

Population (2020)
  - Total: 1,633
  - Density: 1,130.2/sq mi (436.37/km^{2})
- Time zone: UTC-5 (Eastern (EST))
  - Summer (DST): UTC-4 (EDT)
- ZIP code: 13605
- Area code: 315
- FIPS code: 36-00199
- GNIS feature ID: 942159
- Website: www.villageofadamsny.gov

Adams is a village in the town of Adams in Jefferson County, New York, United States. The population was 1,775 at the 2010 census. The village is named after President John Adams.

== History ==
The village was first settled around 1800 and was called "Smith's Mills". It was incorporated in 1851. The historic core of the village was listed on the National Register of Historic Places in 2006 as the Adams Commercial Historic District. and the Smith-Ripley House was listed in 2008.

== Geography ==
Adams is located in southern Jefferson County at 43°48′32″N 76°1′25″W (43.809088, -76.02385), in the southern part of the town of Adams.

According to the United States Census Bureau, the village has a total area of 1.45 square miles (3.75 km^{2}), all land.

The village is adjacent to Interstate 81 and is located on U.S. Route 11 at New York State Route 178. I-81 and US-11 lead north 13 miles (21 km) to Watertown, the county seat, and south 55 miles (89 km) to Syracuse. NY-178 leads west 9 miles (14 km) to Henderson.

Sandy Creek is a stream that flows past the village on its southern border.

== Demographics ==
Historical population
Census	Pop.	Note	%±
1850	600		—
1860	1,268		111.3%
1870	1,352		6.6%
1880	1,250		−7.5%
1890	1,360		8.8%
1900	1,292		−5.0%
1910	1,458		12.8%
1920	1,557		6.8%
1930	1,613		3.6%
1940	1,594		−1.2%
1950	1,762		10.5%
1960	1,914		8.6%
1970	1,951		1.9%
1980	1,701		−12.8%
1990	1,753		3.1%
2000	1,624		−7.4%
2010	1,775		9.3%
2020	1,633		−8.0%
U.S. Decennial Census

At the 2000 census, there were 1,624 people, 705 households and 425 families residing in the village. The population density was 1,054.0 inhabitants per square mile (407.0/km^{2}). There were 781 housing units at an average density of 506.9 per square mile (195.7/km^{2}). The racial makeup of the village was 97.91% White, 0.74% Black or African American, 0.25% Native American, 0.12% Asian, 0.18% from other races, and 0.80% from two or more races. Hispanic or Latino of any race were 1.11% of the population.

There were 705 households, of which 29.6% had children under the age of 18 living with them, 45.4% were married couples living together, 11.5% had a female householder with no husband present, and 39.6% were non-families. 33.3% of all households were made up of individuals, and 17.7% had someone living alone who was 65 years of age or older. The average household size was 2.30 and the average family size was 2.96.

Age distribution was 26.1% under the age of 18, 7.1% from 18 to 24, 28.9% from 25 to 44, 21.6% from 45 to 64, and 16.3% who were 65 years of age or older. The median age was 37 years. For every 100 females, there were 88.0 males. For every 100 females age 18 and over, there were 82.1 males.

The median household income was $30,677, and the median family income was $41,667. Males had a median income of $31,058 versus $25,724 for females. The per capita income for the village was $18,452. About 12.1% of families and 15.3% of the population were below the poverty line, including 22.6% of those under age 18 and 12.2% of those age 65 or over.

== Education ==
The school district is the South Jefferson Central School District.

== Notable people ==
- J. Sterling Morton, U.S. Secretary of Agriculture, founder of Arbor Day.
- Henry Benjamin Whipple, first Episcopal bishop of Minnesota
