= Waterton, Lincolnshire =

Deserted Medieval Village in England

Coordinates: 53.6511°N 0.7121°W

- Location within Lincolnshire
- OS grid reference: SE852179
  - London: 150 mi (240 km) SSE
- Unitary authority: North Lincolnshire
- Ceremonial county: Lincolnshire
- Region: Yorkshire and the Humber
- Country: England
- Sovereign state: United Kingdom
- Postcode district: DN17
- Police: Humberside
- Fire: Humberside
- Ambulance: East Midlands

Waterton is a deserted medieval village on the River Trent near Garthorpe (where any residual population is included) and Luddington in the Isle of Axholme, Lincolnshire, England.

== History ==
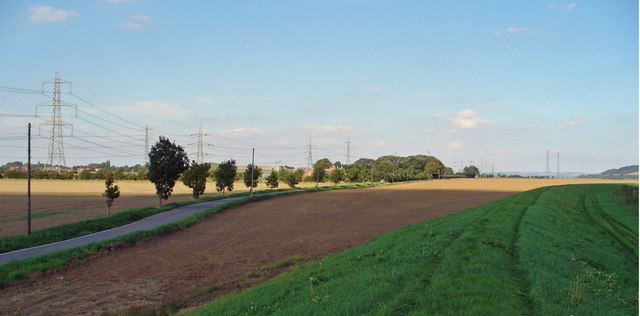
Near Waterton Hall

Waterton is mentioned in the Domesday Book which records that, before the Norman Conquest, the manor was held by Fulcric who had one carucate of land with a hall. At the time of the Domesday survey, it was waste. It became the property of the Abbot of Selby and at some point between 1160 and 1179 when Gilbert de Ver was Abbot, it was given by him to Reiner de Normanby, son of Norman de Normanby, for an annual rent of twelve shillings, the payment of which is enacted annually at Luddington at Candlemas. Reiner took the name de Waterton. According to the 19th-century historian of the Isle of Axholme Rev Stonehouse: "this family is equal if not superior in a long line of ancestry to most of the commoners of England". Notable members of the family include John de Waterton (Master of the Horse), Robert Waterton (guardian of Richard of York, 3rd Duke of York), Sir Hugh Waterton, Sir Robert and Sir Thomas Waterton (High Sheriffs of Yorkshire), Lady Margaret Waterton (Lady of the Garter), and Charles Waterton the naturalist. Robert Waterton is mentioned in Shakespeare's Richard II.

Waterton became deserted in the late 15th or 16th century. Some excavation has been undertaken. It has now been taken over by the Strawson family. Only the seven-bedroom Waterton Hall remains, described by Pevsner as "a fine example of Georgian splendour".
