= Adams Center, New York =

- Census-designated place
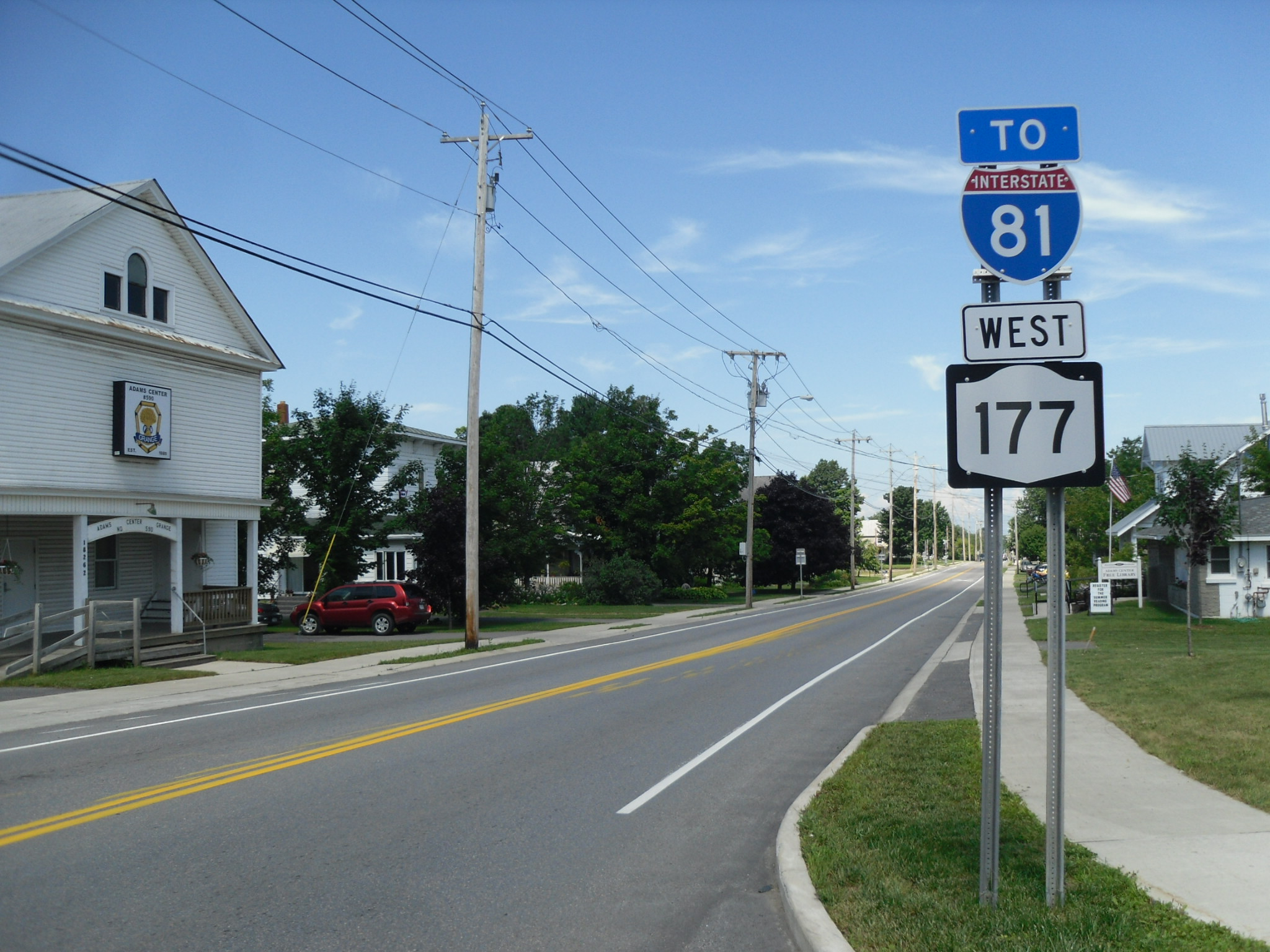
- New York State Route 177 westbound heading through Adams Center

- Location within New York Location within the United States
- Coordinates: 43°51′44″N 76°0′25″W
- Country: United States
- State: New York
- County: Jefferson
- Town: Adams

Area
  - Total: 5.00 sq mi (12.94 km^{2})
  - Land: 4.86 sq mi (12.59 km^{2})
  - Water: 0.14 sq mi (0.35 km^{2})
- Elevation: 640 ft (195 m)

Population (2020)
  - Total: 1,492
  - Density: 307.0/sq mi (118.53/km^{2})
- Time zone: UTC-5 (Eastern (EST))
  - Summer (DST): UTC-4 (EDT)
- ZIP code: 13606
- Area code: 315
- FIPS code: 36-00232
- GNIS feature ID: 0942163

Adams Center (formerly called Adams Five Corners) is a hamlet and census-designated place (CDP) in the town of Adams in Jefferson County, New York, United States. The population was 1,492 during the 2020 decennial census.

== Name ==
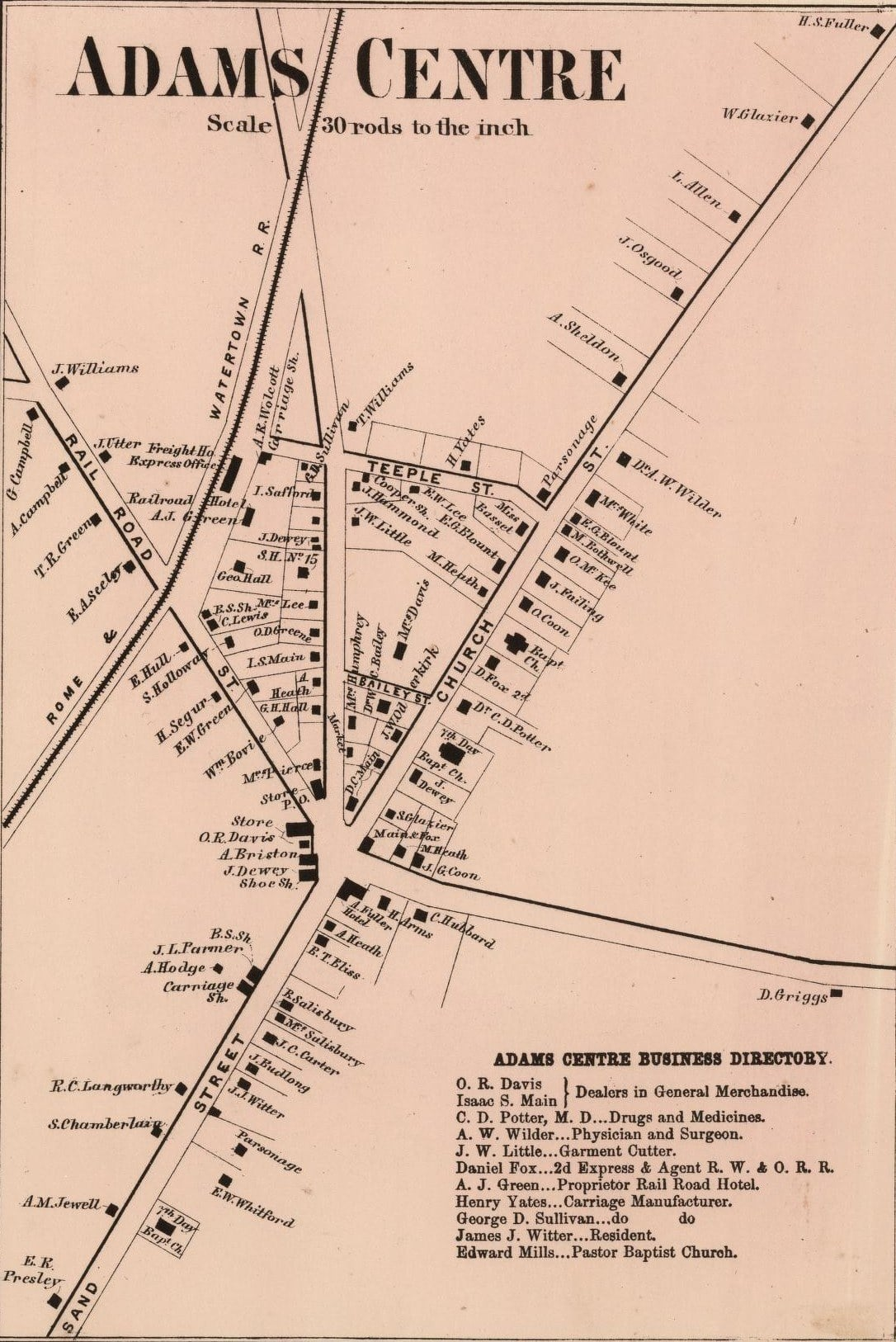
1864 map of Adams Center. The map shows the 5 corners that the previous name was referring to.

The town was first known as "Adams Five Corners". Named because of the 5-road crossroad in the middle of town, the name was used until at least 1828. The exact date of the name change is not known, but the hamlet became known as "Adams Centre", a spelling that continued until approximately 1900.

== History ==
The community was founded c. 1816. A railroad line was completed in 1852.

== Geography ==
Adams Center is in southern Jefferson County at 43°51′44″N 76°0′25″W (43.862191, -76.006955), in the northeastern part of the town of Adams.

According to the United States Census Bureau, the CDP has a total area of 5.0 square miles (12.9 km^{2}), of which 4.86 square miles (12.58 km^{2}) are land and 0.14 square miles (0.35 km^{2}), or 2.71%, are water.

U.S. Route 11, County Roads 66 and 76, and New York State Route 177 pass through the community, and Interstate 81 runs along the western side, with access from Exit 42. US-11 and I-81 each lead north 10 miles (16 km) to Watertown, the Jefferson county seat. US-11 leads south 3.5 miles (5.6 km) to the village of Adams, while I-81 leads south 60 miles (97 km) to Syracuse. NY-177 leads east across the Tug Hill Plateau 24 miles (39 km) to West Lowville.

== Demographics ==
Historical population
Census	Pop.	Note	%±
2020	1,492		—
U.S. Decennial Census

As of the 2000 United States census, there were 1,500 people, 560 households, and 398 families residing in the village. The population density was 302.6 inhabitants per square mile (116.8/km^{2}). There were 617 housing units at an average density of 124.5 per square mile (48.1/km^{2}). The racial makeup of the CDP was 98.67% White, 0.07% African American, 0.20% Native American, 0.27% Asian, 0.07% Pacific Islander, 0.13% from other races, and 0.60% from two or more races. Hispanic or Latino of any race were 0.47% of the population.

There were 560 households, out of which 37.5% had children under the age of 18 living with them, 56.8% were married couples living together, 9.8% had a female householder with no husband present, and 28.9% were non-families. 22.1% of all households were made up of individuals, and 8.8% had someone living alone who was 65 years of age or older. The average household size was 2.68 and the average family size was 3.13.

In the community, the population was spread out, with 28.2% under the age of 18, 8.6% from 18 to 24, 30.1% from 25 to 44, 22.1% from 45 to 64, and 11.0% who were 65 years of age or older. The median age was 36 years. For every 100 females, there were 99.2 males. For every 100 females age 18 and over, there were 89.9 males.

The median income for a household in the village was $41,938, and the median income for a family was $49,485. Males had a median income of $35,441 versus $24,219 for females. The per capita income for the CDP was $16,288. About 5.2% of families and 6.9% of the population were below the poverty line, including 7.9% of those under age 18 and none of those age 65 or over.

== Education ==
The school district is the South Jefferson Central School District.

== Notable person ==
- Melvil Dewey, inventor of the Dewey Decimal Classification library classification system
