= Hugh Waterton =

Servant of the House of Lancaster

Sir Hugh Waterton
- Died: 2 July 1409
- Spouses: Ellen Mowbray; Katherine (surname unknown)
- Issue: Elizabeth Waterton; Blanche Waterton
- Father: William Waterton
- Mother: Elizabeth Newmarch

Sir Hugh Waterton (born c. 1340 [before 1373] – died 2 July 1409) was a trusted servant of the House of Lancaster.

== Family ==
Waterton's date of birth is not known. Some would have it, he was the second son of William Waterton of Waterton, Lincolnshire, and Elizabeth Newmarch, the daughter of Sir Roger Newmarch of Womersley, Yorkshire, by his wife, Maud.A Hugh Waterton, Esq. is known who was a young man in 1386, knighted by 1398, d.1409, born son of William Waterton by his wife, daughter and heiress of Thomas Methley of Methley, near Wakefield, Yorkshire; He had an elder brother, John Waterton, and was uncle to Robert Waterton, another lifelong Lancastrian servant.

== Career ==
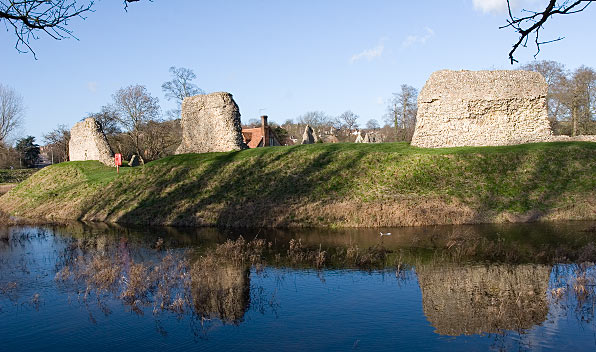
Ruins of Berkhamstead Castle, where Sir Hugh Waterton had Edmund Mortimer and his brother in his custody

Waterton served in France in 1373 with John of Gaunt, 1st Duke of Lancaster and became his attorney. By 1375 he had acquired the manor of Eaton Tregoz near Ross-on-Wye in Herefordshire, which by an inquisition taken after his death was found to contain castle buildings and a deer park of 144 acres. By 1377 he was one of Gaunt's retainers, and in 1399 an executor of his will.

From the late 1370s he was also associated with Gaunt's son, Henry Bolingbroke, the future Henry IV, becoming a Privy Councillor and by 1386 was Bolingbroke's chamberlain. On 10 July 1386 he was among those who gave evidence in the celebrated case between Richard le Scrope, 1st Baron Scrope of Bolton, and Sir Robert Grosvernor as to their respective right to bear the arms Azure a bend or. In 1387 he was in charge, as Constable, of Bolingbroke's castles of Brecon and Hay. In 1391 he was chief steward of Brecon and of Bolingbroke's other Welsh estates. Both he and his nephew, Robert Waterton, were with Bolingbroke at the siege of Vilnius in 1391, and again in 1392. He also accompanied Bolingbroke on his journey to Jerusalem in the following year.

He was knighted in 1396, and was a Justice of the Peace in Herefordshire in 1397. In October 1398, as 'Hugh de Waterton, Chivaler', he was appointed attorney for Bolingbroke during his absence from England.

When Bolingbroke came to the throne as Henry IV in 1399, Waterton was appointed Chamberlain of the Duchy of Lancaster, a position which he held until his death. In the same year he was given custody of Chepstow Castle and appointed as steward of other lands during the minority of Thomas de Mowbray, son and heir of Thomas de Mowbray, 1st Duke of Norfolk, and was also appointed Keeper of St Briavels Castle. Numerous other offices and grants followed, including his appointment, in 1401, as steward and constable of four Lancastrian castles in Wales at Monmouth, Grosmont, Whitecastle, and Skenfrith. On 1 October 1401 he was appointed one of the 'Custodes' of Henry IV's underage son, Thomas of Lancaster, who was travelling to Ireland to serve as Lord Lieutenant.

During Henry IV's reign Waterton continued to be appointed to commissions in Gloucestershire and Herefordshire, including Justice of the Peace. When Owain Glyndŵr rebelled in 1400, he was active in the suppression of the rebellion. In May 1402 he was one of the commissioners authorised to negotiate the marriage of the future Henry V of England, then Prince of Wales, with Catherine, adopted daughter of Margaret I of Denmark. In the following July, he was appointed Keeper of Berkhamstead Castle, and Governor of Henry IV's children John and Philippa, and their cousins, Edmund Mortimer, 5th Earl of March and his brother, Roger, who were to remain at Berkhamstead until the King's return from a campaign in Wales.

He was appointed to the King's council in 1405, and lent the King 'substantial sums of money' during the early years of his reign. He was also appointed to be Constable of Queenborough Castle on the Isle of Sheppey and in February 1405 he was appointed Constable of Windsor Castle, and served as a Justice of the Peace in Berkshire.

He died 2 July 1409, having made his will the previous day. His place of burial is unknown. His will was proved at Lambeth on 7 July 1409. By inquisitions post mortem he was found to be seized of the manor of Wroot and two parts of the manor of Epworth, both in Lincolnshire, and the manors of Credenhill and Eaton Tregoz near Ross-on-Wye in Herefordshire and Bramsbergh in Gloucestershire. His heirs were his two daughters by his first marriage.

His arms differed slightly from those of his brother and nephew and were Barry of six, Argent and Gules, over all three Crescents sable.

== Marriages and issue ==
Waterton married (1st) Ellen de Mowbray, the daughter of Robert (or Thomas) Mowbray, Esquire, by whom he had a son and three daughters:

- John Waterton, who died without issue in the lifetime of his father,
- Elizabeth Waterton (died before 1420), who married John ap Harry, Esquire, of Poston, Herefordshire, by whom she had two sons, Hugh ap Harry, who died without issue, and Richard ap Harry, who made proof of his age in 1430/31.
- Blanche Waterton, born about 1380 (aged 40 and more in 1420). She married in 1393 Robert Chalons, of Challonsleigh in Plympton St Mary, Awliscombe, and Buckerell in Devon and of Fonthill Gifford and Upavon in Wiltshire, later a Knight of the king's chamber, Sheriff of Devon in 1409–10 and 1420–22, and Knight of the Shire for Devon in 1420. They had two sons, including Henry, and two daughters, Elizabeth (wife of John Ferrers) and Katherine (wife of John St Aubyn). Blanche died 3 September 1437.
- Katherine Waterton, who died unmarried in the lifetime of her father.

Waterton married (2nd) by November 1394, Katherine (died 4 May 1420), widow of Sir John de Bromwich (died shortly before 20 September 1388), and daughter of Alexander Walden, by whom he had no issue.

After Waterton's death, his widow Katherine married (3rd) by October 1414 Sir Roger Leche (died 1416) of Chatsworth, Derbyshire, Sheriff of Nottinghamshire and Derbyshire, 1400–1401, Knight of the Shire for Derbyshire, 1402, 1406, 1413–14, Controller of the Household of King Henry IV, 1404–5, Steward of the Household to Henry, Prince of Wales [future King Henry V], 1407–13, Sheriff of Flintshire, 1407–16, Treasurer of the Household of King Henry V, 1413–16, Chamberlain of the Duchy of Lancaster, 1416, Treasurer of England, 1416.
