= Adams, New York =

- Town
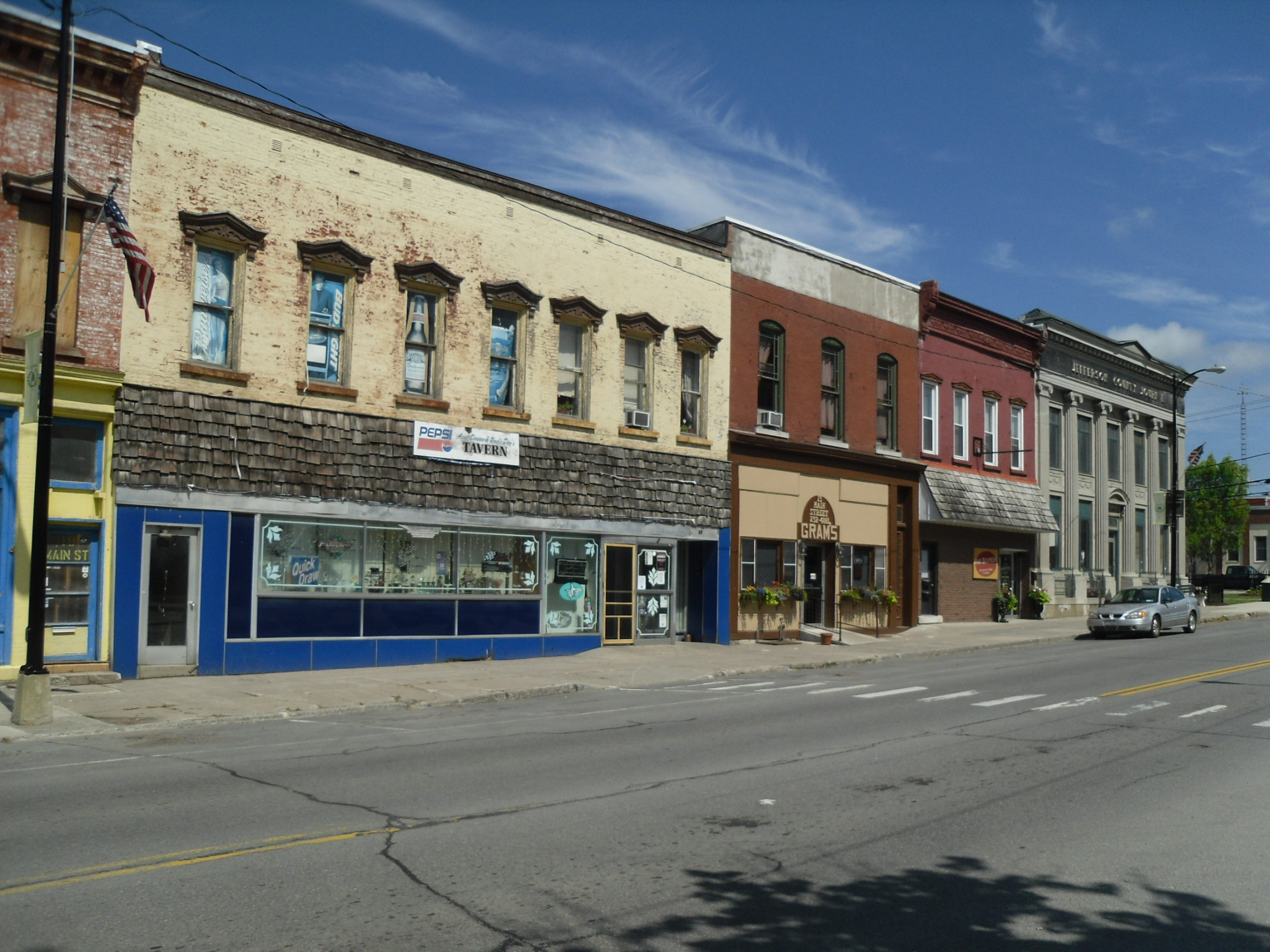
- Adams Commercial Historic District

- Location within New York Location within the United States
- Coordinates: 43°48′36″N 76°01′26″W
- Country: United States
- State: New York
- County: Jefferson
- Incorporated: 1802

Government
  - Mayor: Thomas Ross(R); Town Council

Area
  - Total: 42.38 sq mi (109.77 km^{2})
  - Land: 42.23 sq mi (109.38 km^{2})
  - Water: 0.15 sq mi (0.40 km^{2})
- Elevation: 619 ft (189 m)

Population (2020)
  - Total: 4,973
  - Density: 120.6/sq mi (46.57/km^{2})
- Time zone: UTC-5 (EST)
  - Summer (DST): UTC-4 (EDT)
- ZIP Codes: 13605 (Adams); 13606 (Adams Center)
- Area code: 315
- FIPS code: 36-045-00210
- Website: www.townofadams.com

Adams is a town in Jefferson County, New York, United States. Named after President John Adams, the town had a population of 5,143 at the 2010 census. The town contains a village also named Adams. The village and town are south of Watertown.

== History ==
Settlement began around 1800 at Adams village. David Smith built a sawmill at the present site of Adams in 1801. Renamed for John Adams in 1802 (the year after his presidency ended), the town of Adams was created from the survey townships of Aleppo and Orpheus. The eastern part of Adams was taken in 1804 to form the town of Rodman. During the War of 1812, the town of Adams formed a local militia for home defense.

The Talcott Falls Site was listed on the National Register of Historic Places in 1974.

== Geography ==
According to the United States Census Bureau, the town has an area of 42.4 square miles (109.9 km^{2}), of which 42.3 square miles (109.5 km^{2}) are land and 0.15 square miles (0.4 km^{2}), or 0.36%, are water.

Interstate 81 is a major north-south highway through the middle of Adams. It has three interchanges within the town limit. New York State Route 177 runs eastward from U.S. Route 11, another north-south highway, at Adams Center. New York State Route 178 runs westward from Adams village.

The town is to the west of the Tug Hill Plateau. Sandy Creek flows westward through the southern part of the town, and Stony Creek flows through the northern section. Both creeks are direct tributaries of Lake Ontario.

== Demographics ==
Historical population
Census	Pop.	Note	%±
1820	2,467		—
1830	2,995		21.4%
1840	2,966		−1.0%
1850	3,106		4.7%
1860	3,496		12.6%
1870	3,348		−4.2%
1880	3,302		−1.4%
1890	3,181		−3.7%
1900	3,081		−3.1%
1910	3,128		1.5%
1920	3,194		2.1%
1930	3,284		2.8%
1940	3,334		1.5%
1950	3,629		8.8%
1960	3,964		9.2%
1970	4,381		10.5%
1980	4,390		0.2%
1990	4,977		13.4%
2000	4,782		−3.9%
2010	5,143		7.5%
2020	4,973		−3.3%
U.S. Decennial Census

As of the census of 2000, there were 4,782 people, 1,864 households, and 1,293 families residing in the town. The population density was 112.8 inhabitants per square mile (43.6/km^{2}). There were 2,019 housing units at an average density of 47.6 per square mile (18.4/km^{2}). The town's racial makeup of the town was 97.97% White, 0.29% Black or African American, 0.27% Native American, 0.36% Asian, 0.02% Pacific Islander, 0.21% from other races, and 0.88% from two or more races. Hispanic or Latino of any race were 0.65% of the population.

There were 1,864 households, of which 35.4% had children under the age of 18 living with them, 56.2% were married couples living together, 9.5% had a female householder with no husband present, and 30.6% were non-families. 24.5% of all households were made up of individuals, and 11.6% had someone living alone who was 65 years of age or older. The average household size was 2.56 and the average family size was 3.05.

27.5% of the town's population was under age 18, 6.9% from age 18 to 24, 30.0% from age 25 to 44, 23.2% from age 45 to 64, and 12.3% were age 65 or older. The median age was 37 years. For every 100 females, there were 94.9 males. For every 100 females age 18 and over, there were 89.0 males.

The town's median household income was $38,012, and the median family income was $48,354. Males had a median income of $34,000 versus $25,610 for females. The town's per capita income was $17,707. About 6.6% of families and 9.6% of the population were below the poverty line, including 12.7% of those under age 18 and 7.0% of those age 65 or over.

== Communities and locations ==
- Adams – The village of Adams is near the southern town line on US-11 at NY-178.
- Adams Center – A hamlet and census-designated place north of Adams village on U.S. Route 11 at NY-177.
- Butterville – A location at the western town line on County Road 76.
- Coopers Corners – A former location in the town.
- Green Settlement – A hamlet on County Road 76 (Green Rd.) west of Adams Center.
- Honeyville – A location on County Road 177 east of Adams Center.
- Lisk Settlement – A former location in the town.
- Lyon Corners – A location near the western town line on County Road 76.
- North Adams – A hamlet near the northern town line by North Kellog and Cady Roads.
- Sanford Corners – A location on County Road 66 in the northwestern corner of the town.
- Smithville – A hamlet on County Road 75 on the western town line.
- Talcott Corners – A location on US-11 in the northeastern corner of the town.
- Thomas Settlement – A hamlet on NY-178 in the southwestern corner of the town.

== Notable people ==
- Emma Whitcomb Babcock (1849–1926), litterateur and author
- William E. Blackstone (1841–1935), evangelical Christian and Zionist
- Alvan E. Bovay, co-founder of the Republican Party
- Charles Grandison Finney (1792–1875), prominent evangelist
- Mary Ninde Gamewell (1858-1947), American missionary in China; writer
- Henry Keep (1818–1869), born in Adams, noted financier and president of several railroad firms. He left an estate of over four million dollars.
- J. Sterling Morton (1832–1902), father of Arbor Day
- Philander Smith (1809–1882), son of mill operator and original settler David Smith, eponym of Philander Smith College and father-in-law of William E. Blackstone (above)
- Nikki Tilroe (1941–2005), Actress and dancer who buried
- Charles H. Whipple (1849–1932), US Army brigadier general
- Henry Benjamin Whipple (1822–1901), first Episcopal bishop of Minnesota
