= Meyers Hill =

Meyers Hill may refer to:

- Meyers Hill (New York)
- Meyers Hill (Oregon)
