= White Lake, New York =

Locations named White Lake in the U.S. state of New York include:

- White Lake, Oneida County, New York, a census-designated place
  - White Lake (Oneida County, New York), the corresponding lake
- White Lake, Sullivan County, New York, a census-designated place
- White Lake Mountain, a summit in the town of Benson
