= Otter Lake Outlet =

Location
- Country: United States
- State: New York

Physical characteristics
- Source: Otter Lake
  - location: Otter Lake, New York
  - coordinates: 43°35′14″N 75°07′35″W
- Mouth: Long Lake
  - location: N of Holiday House, New York
  - coordinates: 43°34′13″N 75°08′31″W
  - elevation: 1,476 ft (450 m)

Otter Lake Outlet drains Otter Lake and flows southeast before emptying into Long Lake. It is in Oneida County, New York.
