= List of municipalities in New York =

New York municipalities
- Map of the 1,525 municipalities in New York
- Category: Second-level administrative division
- Location: New York
- Number: 933 Towns; 62 Cities; 532 Villages
- Populations: 50 (Dering Harbor) – 8,804,190 (New York City)
- Areas: 0.1 square miles (0.26 km^{2}) (South Floral Park) – 300.5 square miles (778 km^{2}) (New York City)
- Government: Municipal government

This is a list of municipalities in New York other than towns, which includes all 532 villages and 62 cities of New York State. Of the total 594 municipalities, 587 are non-town municipalities, while six are coterminous town-villages, villages that are coterminous with their town, and one is a consolidated town-village, where the village is smaller in size and population than the town, but they still share the same government.

At the time of the 2010 United States census, the state of New York had 555 villages. Since then, two villages were created (Mastic Beach in Suffolk County and Tuxedo in Orange County) and 27 villages were dissolved (including Mastic Beach, after only seven years of incorporation). Although still listed in the 2024 population estimates from the US Census, this includes the village of Fort Johnson (dissolved December 31, 2023).

Most municipalities in New York are located within a single town and county, but some municipalities are located in more than one town. Of those, there are two cities and eight villages located in more than one county:

- Geneva, in Ontario and Seneca Counties, although the portion in Seneca County has no population and is entirely water
- New York, in Bronx, Kings, New York, Queens and Richmond Counties
- Almond, in Allegany and Steuben Counties
- Attica, in Genesee and Wyoming Counties
- Deposit, in Broome and Delaware Counties
- Dolgeville, in Fulton and Herkimer Counties
- Earlville, in Chenago and Madison Counties
- Gowanda, in Cattaraugus and Erie Counties
- Rushville, in Ontario and Yates Counties
- Saranac Lake, in Essex and Franklin Counties

Municipalities in New York
Name	County	Pop. (2020)	Land		Town	Type
Name	County	Pop. (2020)	mi2	km2	Town	Type
Adams	Jefferson	1,633	1.447	3.746	Adams	Village
Addison	Steuben	1,561	1.893	4.901	Addison	Village
Afton	Chenango	794	1.527	3.953	Afton	Village
Airmont	Rockland	10,166	4.643	12.020	Ramapo	Village
Akron	Erie	2,888	1.976	5.116	Newstead	Village
Albany	Albany	99,224	21.40	55.402	None	City
Albion	Orleans	5,637	2.920	7.560	Albion & Gaines	Village
Alden	Erie	2,604	2.718	7.037	Alden	Village
Alexander	Genesee	518	0.437	1.131	Alexander	Village
Alexandria Bay	Jefferson	924	0.766	1.983	Alexandria	Village
Alfred	Allegany	4,026	1.190	3.081	Alfred	Village
Allegany	Cattaraugus	1,544	0.705	1.825	Allegany	Village
Almond	Allegany, Steuben	415	0.564	1.460	Almond & Hornellsville	Village
Altamont	Albany	1,675	1.186	3.070	Guilderland	Village
Ames	Montgomery	138	0.131	0.339	Canajoharie	Village
Amityville	Suffolk	9,500	2.113	5.470	Babylon	Village
Amsterdam	Montgomery	18,219	5.87	15.197	None	City
Andover	Allegany	890	1.001	2.591	Andover	Village
Angelica	Allegany	723	2.152	5.571	Angelica	Village
Angola	Erie	2,046	1.417	3.668	Evans	Village
Antwerp	Jefferson	506	1.035	2.680	Antwerp	Village
Arcade	Wyoming	1,908	2.649	6.858	Arcade	Village
Ardsley	Westchester	5,079	1.323	3.425	Greenburgh	Village
Argyle	Washington	289	0.350	0.906	Argyle	Village
Arkport	Steuben	745	0.694	1.797	Hornellsville	Village
Asharoken	Suffolk	592	1.471	3.808	Huntington	Village
Athens	Greene	1,586	3.420	8.854	Athens	Village
Atlantic Beach	Nassau	1,707	0.439	1.137	Hempstead	Village
Attica	Wyoming, Genesse	2,450	1.691	4.378	Alexander & Attica	Village
Auburn	Cayuga	26,866	8.34	21.591	None	City
Aurora	Cayuga	607	0.919	2.379	Ledyard	Village
Avoca	Steuben	809	1.326	3.433	Avoca	Village
Avon	Livingston	3,399	3.099	8.023	Avon	Village
Babylon	Suffolk	12,188	2.445	6.330	Babylon	Village
Bainbridge	Chenango	1,251	1.239	3.208	Bainbridge	Village
Baldwinsville	Onondaga	7,898	3.092	8.005	Lysander & Van Buren	Village
Ballston Spa	Saratoga	5,111	1.599	4.140	Ballston & Milton	Village
Barker	Niagara	575	0.420	1.087	Somerset	Village
Batavia	Genesee	15,600	5.20	13.462	None	City
Bath	Steuben	5,571	3.175	8.220	Bath	Village
Baxter Estates	Nassau	991	0.182	0.471	North Hempstead	Village
Bayville	Nassau	6,748	1.450	3.754	Oyster Bay	Village
Beacon	Dutchess	13,769	4.74	12.271	None	City
Belle Terre	Suffolk	808	0.885	2.291	Brookhaven	Village
Bellerose	Nassau	1,173	0.125	0.324	Hempstead	Village
Bellport	Suffolk	2,203	1.445	3.741	Brookhaven	Village
Belmont	Allegany	856	0.996	2.579	Amity	Village
Bemus Point	Chautauqua	306	0.436	1.129	Ellery	Village
Bergen	Genesee	1,208	0.737	1.908	Bergen	Village
Binghamton	Broome	47,969	10.48	27.132	None	City
Black River	Jefferson	1,232	1.791	4.637	Le Ray & Rutland	Village
Blasdell	Erie	2,539	1.123	2.907	Hamburg	Village
Bloomfield	Ontario	1,277	1.397	3.617	East Bloomfield	Village
Bloomingburg	Sullivan	1,032	0.688	1.781	Mamakating	Village
Bolivar	Allegany	1,010	0.798	2.066	Bolivar	Village
Boonville	Oneida	2,020	1.729	4.476	Boonville	Village
Brewster	Putnam	2,508	0.467	1.209	Southeast	Village
Briarcliff Manor	Westchester	7,569	5.962	15.435	Mount Pleasant & Ossining	Village
Brightwaters	Suffolk	3,181	0.976	2.527	Islip	Village
Broadalbin	Fulton	1,384	1.122	2.905	Broadalbin & Mayfield	Village
Brockport	Monroe	7,104	2.161	5.595	Clarkson & Sweden	Village
Brocton	Chautauqua	1,286	1.710	4.427	Portland	Village
Bronxville	Westchester	6,656	0.962	2.491	Eastchester	Village
Brookville	Nassau	2,939	3.937	10.192	Oyster Bay	Village
Brownville	Jefferson	930	0.673	1.742	Brownville	Village
Brushton	Franklin	443	0.276	0.715	Moira	Village
Buchanan	Westchester	2,302	1.382	3.578	Cortlandt	Village
Buffalo	Erie	278,349	40.38	104.540	None	City
Burdett	Schuyler	331	0.962	2.491	Hector	Village
Burke	Franklin	160	0.290	0.751	Burke	Village
Caledonia	Livingston	2,080	2.097	5.429	Caledonia	Village
Cambridge	Washington	1,788	1.678	4.344	Cambridge & White Creek	Village
Camden	Oneida	2,196	2.436	6.307	Camden	Village
Camillus	Onondaga	1,222	0.390	1.010	Camillus	Village
Canajoharie	Montgomery	2,037	1.330	3.443	Canajoharie	Village
Canandaigua	Ontario	10,576	4.56	11.805	None	City
Canaseraga	Allegany	460	1.062	2.749	Burns	Village
Canastota	Madison	4,556	3.351	8.675	Lenox	Village
Candor	Tioga	786	0.441	1.142	Candor	Village
Canisteo	Steuben	2,176	0.934	2.418	Canisteo	Village
Canton	St. Lawrence	7,155	3.576	9.258	Canton	Village
Cape Vincent	Jefferson	699	0.724	1.874	Cape Vincent	Village
Carthage	Jefferson	3,236	2.508	6.493	Wilna	Village
Cassadaga	Chautauqua	573	0.839	2.172	Stockton	Village
Castile	Wyoming	970	1.352	3.500	Castile	Village
Castleton-on-Hudson	Rensselaer	1,477	0.714	1.848	Schodack	Village
Castorland	Lewis	334	0.321	0.831	Denmark	Village
Cato	Cayuga	517	0.989	2.560	Cato & Ira	Village
Catskill	Greene	3,745	2.280	5.903	Catskill	Village
Cattaraugus	Cattaraugus	960	1.117	2.892	New Albion	Village
Cayuga	Cayuga	472	0.904	2.340	Aurelius	Village
Cayuga Heights	Tompkins	4,114	1.767	4.575	Ithaca	Village
Cazenovia	Madison	2,767	1.873	4.849	Cazenovia	Village
Cedarhurst	Nassau	7,374	0.675	1.748	Hempstead	Village
Celoron	Chautauqua	1,069	0.747	1.934	Ellicott	Village
Central Square	Oswego	1,862	1.906	4.934	Hastings	Village
Centre Island	Nassau	407	1.090	2.822	Oyster Bay	Village
Champlain	Clinton	1,170	1.390	3.599	Champlain	Village
Chateaugay	Franklin	735	1.083	2.804	Chateaugay	Village
Chatham	Columbia	1,529	1.237	3.202	Chatham & Ghent	Village
Chaumont	Jefferson	615	0.971	2.514	Lyme	Village
Cherry Valley	Otsego	467	0.510	1.320	Cherry Valley	Village
Chester	Orange	3,993	2.148	5.561	Chester & Goshen	Village
Chestnut Ridge	Rockland	10,505	4.968	12.862	Ramapo	Village
Chittenango	Madison	4,896	2.441	6.320	Sullivan	Village
Churchville	Monroe	2,091	1.153	2.985	Riga	Village
Clayton	Jefferson	1,705	1.613	4.176	Clayton	Village
Clayville	Oneida	339	0.439	1.137	Paris	Village
Cleveland	Oswego	732	1.131	2.928	Constantia	Village
Clifton Springs	Ontario	2,209	1.519	3.933	Manchester & Phelps	Village
Clinton	Oneida	1,683	0.626	1.621	Kirkland	Village
Clyde	Wayne	2,171	2.198	5.690	Galen	Village
Cobleskill	Schoharie	4,173	3.572	9.248	Cobleskill	Village
Cohocton	Steuben	703	1.501	3.886	Cohocton	Village
Cohoes	Albany	18,147	3.77	9.760	None	City
Cold Brook	Herkimer	250	0.439	1.137	Russia	Village
Cold Spring	Putnam	1,986	0.594	1.538	Philipstown	Village
Colonie	Albany	7,781	3.242	8.393	Colonie	Village
Constableville	Lewis	293	1.118	2.894	West Turin	Village
Cooperstown	Otsego	1,794	1.635	4.233	Middlefield & Otsego	Village
Copenhagen	Lewis	631	1.176	3.045	Denmark	Village
Corfu	Genesee	689	0.995	2.576	Darien & Pembroke	Village
Corinth	Saratoga	2,562	1.067	2.762	Corinth	Village
Corning	Steuben	10,551	3.08	7.974	None	City
Cornwall-on-Hudson	Orange	3,075	1.987	5.144	Cornwall	Village
Cortland	Cortland	17,556	3.89	10.071	None	City
Cove Neck	Nassau	293	1.284	3.324	Oyster Bay	Village
Coxsackie	Greene	2,746	2.172	5.623	Coxsackie	Village
Croghan	Lewis	639	0.434	1.124	Croghan & New Bremen	Village
Croton-on-Hudson	Westchester	8,327	4.642	12.018	Cortlandt	Village
Cuba	Allegany	1,517	1.216	3.148	Cuba	Village
Dannemora	Clinton	3,287	1.148	2.972	Dannemora & Saranac	Village
Dansville	Livingston	4,433	2.608	6.752	North Dansville & Sparta	Village
Deferiet	Jefferson	245	0.650	1.683	Wilna	Village
Delanson	Schenectady	335	0.644	1.667	Duanesburg	Village
Delevan	Cattaraugus	1,043	0.994	2.573	Yorkshire	Village
Delhi	Delaware	2,721	3.142	8.134	Delhi	Village
Depew	Erie	15,178	5.074	13.136	Cheektowaga & Lancaster	Village
Deposit	Broome, Delaware	1,387	1.263	3.270	Deposit & Sanford	Village
Dering Harbor	Suffolk	50	0.246	0.637	Shelter Island	Village
DeRuyter	Madison	408	0.344	0.891	DeRuyter	Village
Dexter	Jefferson	1,004	0.692	1.792	Brownville	Village
Dobbs Ferry	Westchester	11,541	2.429	6.288	Greenburgh	Village
Dolgeville	Herkimer, Fulton	2,042	1.791	4.637	Manheim & Oppenheim	Village
Dresden	Yates	293	0.302	0.782	Torrey	Village
Dryden	Tompkins	1,887	1.756	4.546	Dryden	Village
Dundee	Yates	1,690	1.124	2.910	Starkey	Village
Dunkirk	Chautauqua	12,743	4.54	11.754	None	City
Earlville	Chenango, Madison	774	1.079	2.793	Hamilton & Sherburne	Village
East Aurora	Erie	5,998	2.512	6.503	Aurora	Village
East Hampton	Suffolk	1,517	4.764	12.334	East Hampton	Village
East Hills	Nassau	7,284	2.273	5.885	North Hempstead & Oyster Bay	Village
East Nassau	Rensselaer	559	4.863	12.590	Nassau	Village
East Rochester	Monroe	6,334	1.325	3.430	East Rochester	Coterminous Town-Village
East Rockaway	Nassau	10,159	1.017	2.633	Hempstead	Village
East Syracuse	Onondaga	3,078	1.622	4.199	DeWitt	Village
East Williston	Nassau	2,645	0.569	1.473	North Hempstead	Village
Elba	Genesee	558	1.017	2.633	Elba	Village
Elbridge	Onondaga	921	1.126	2.915	Elbridge	Village
Ellenville	Ulster	4,167	8.725	22.588	Wawarsing	Village
Ellicottville	Cattaraugus	256	0.820	2.123	Ellicottville	Village
Ellisburg	Jefferson	186	1.015	2.628	Ellisburg	Village
Elmira	Chemung	26,523	7.25	18.770	None	City
Elmira Heights	Chemung	3,916	1.146	2.967	Elmira & Horseheads	Village
Elmsford	Westchester	5,239	1.027	2.659	Greenburgh	Village
Endicott	Broome	13,667	3.194	8.269	Union	Village
Esperance	Schoharie	346	0.491	1.271	Esperance	Village
Evans Mills	Jefferson	678	0.829	2.146	Le Ray	Village
Fabius	Onondaga	309	0.398	1.030	Fabius	Village
Fair Haven	Cayuga	760	1.755	4.544	Sterling	Village
Fairport	Monroe	5,501	1.589	4.114	Perinton	Village
Falconer	Chautauqua	2,269	1.093	2.830	Ellicott	Village
Farmingdale	Nassau	8,466	1.121	2.902	Oyster Bay	Village
Farnham	Erie	381	1.207	3.125	Brant	Village
Fayetteville	Onondaga	4,225	1.746	4.520	Manlius	Village
Fishkill	Dutchess	2,166	0.820	2.123	Fishkill	Village
Fleischmanns	Delaware	210	0.655	1.696	Middletown	Village
Floral Park	Nassau	16,172	1.417	3.668	Hempstead & North Hempstead	Village
Florida	Orange	2,888	2.251	5.828	Goshen & Warwick	Village
Flower Hill	Nassau	4,794	1.618	4.189	North Hempstead	Village
Fonda	Montgomery	668	0.539	1.395	Mohawk	Village
Fort Ann	Washington	460	0.293	0.759	Fort Ann	Village
Fort Edward	Washington	3,108	1.756	4.546	Fort Edward	Village
Fort Plain	Montgomery	1,930	1.346	3.485	Canajoharie & Minden	Village
Frankfort	Herkimer	2,320	1.014	2.625	Frankfort	Village
Franklin	Delaware	258	0.339	0.878	Franklin	Village
Franklinville	Cattaraugus	1,652	1.100	2.848	Franklinville	Village
Fredonia	Chautauqua	9,585	5.189	13.434	Pomfret	Village
Freeport	Nassau	44,472	4.628	11.981	Hempstead	Village
Freeville	Tompkins	498	1.058	2.739	Dryden	Village
Fulton	Oswego	11,389	3.92	10.148	None	City
Fultonville	Montgomery	742	0.477	1.235	Glen	Village
Gainesville	Wyoming	211	0.856	2.216	Gainesville	Village
Galway	Saratoga	165	0.256	0.663	Galway	Village
Garden City	Nassau	23,272	5.330	13.799	Hempstead & North Hempstead	Village
Geneseo	Livingston	7,574	2.839	7.350	Geneseo	Village
Geneva	Ontario, Seneca	12,812	4.21	10.899	None	City
Gilbertsville	Otsego	308	1.003	2.597	Butternuts	Village
Glen Cove	Nassau	28,365	6.66	17.242	None	City
Glens Falls	Warren	14,830	3.85	9.967	None	City
Glen Park	Jefferson	452	0.708	1.833	Brownville & Pamelia	Village
Gloversville	Fulton	15,131	5.05	13.074	None	City
Goshen	Orange	5,777	3.330	8.621	Goshen	Village
Gouverneur	St. Lawrence	3,526	2.191	5.672	Gouverneur	Village
Gowanda	Erie, Cattaraugus	2,513	1.593	4.124	Collins & Persia	Village
Grand View-on-Hudson	Rockland	246	0.176	0.456	Orangetown	Village
Granville	Washington	2,404	1.570	4.065	Granville	Village
Great Neck	Nassau	11,145	1.329	3.441	North Hempstead	Village
Great Neck Estates	Nassau	2,990	0.757	1.960	North Hempstead	Village
Great Neck Plaza	Nassau	7,482	0.312	0.808	North Hempstead	Village
Green Island	Albany	2,934	0.747	1.934	Green Island	Coterminous Town-Village
Greene	Chenango	1,463	1.068	2.765	Greene	Village
Greenport	Suffolk	2,583	0.956	2.475	Southold	Village
Greenwich	Washington	1,651	1.477	3.824	Easton & Greenwich	Village
Greenwood Lake	Orange	2,994	2.048	5.302	Warwick	Village
Groton	Tompkins	2,145	1.738	4.500	Groton	Village
Hagaman	Montgomery	1,117	1.498	3.878	Amsterdam	Village
Hamburg	Erie	9,696	2.486	6.436	Hamburg	Village
Hamilton	Madison	4,107	2.486	6.436	Eaton, Hamilton & Madison	Village
Hammond	St. Lawrence	273	0.586	1.517	Hammond	Village
Hammondsport	Steuben	583	0.345	0.893	Urbana	Village
Hancock	Delaware	908	1.502	3.889	Hancock	Village
Hannibal	Oswego	535	1.152	2.982	Hannibal	Village
Harriman	Orange	2,714	1.004	2.599	Monroe & Woodbury	Village
Harrison	Westchester	28,218	16.766	43.405	Harrison	Coterminous Town-Village
Hastings-on-Hudson	Westchester	8,590	1.952	5.054	Greenburgh	Village
Haverstraw	Rockland	12,323	1.980	5.126	Haverstraw	Village
Head of the Harbor	Suffolk	1,520	2.807	7.267	Smithtown	Village
Hempstead	Nassau	59,169	3.682	9.532	Hempstead	Village
Herkimer	Herkimer	7,234	2.588	6.700	Herkimer	Village
Heuvelton	St. Lawrence	722	0.761	1.970	Oswegatchie	Village
Hewlett Bay Park	Nassau	494	0.337	0.872	Hempstead	Village
Hewlett Harbor	Nassau	1,290	0.726	1.880	Hempstead	Village
Hewlett Neck	Nassau	569	0.193	0.500	Hempstead	Village
Highland Falls	Orange	3,684	1.090	2.822	Highlands	Village
Hillburn	Rockland	930	2.251	5.828	Ramapo	Village
Hilton	Monroe	6,027	1.780	4.608	Parma	Village
Hobart	Delaware	351	0.498	1.289	Stamford	Village
Holland Patent	Oneida	416	0.506	1.310	Trenton	Village
Holley	Orleans	1,754	1.268	3.283	Murray	Village
Homer	Cortland	3,210	1.925	4.984	Cortlandville & Homer	Village
Honeoye Falls	Monroe	2,706	2.543	6.584	Mendon	Village
Hoosick Falls	Rensselaer	3,216	1.598	4.137	Hoosick	Village
Hornell	Steuben	8,263	3.28	8.492	None	City
Horseheads	Chemung	6,606	3.887	10.063	Horseheads	Village
Hudson	Columbia	5,894	2.33	6.032	None	City
Hudson Falls	Washington	7,427	1.832	4.743	Kingsbury	Village
Hunter	Greene	429	1.735	4.492	Hunter	Village
Huntington Bay	Suffolk	1,446	0.998	2.584	Huntington	Village
Ilion	Herkimer	7,646	2.493	6.454	Frankfort & German Flatts	Village
Interlaken	Seneca	595	0.267	0.691	Covert	Village
Irvington	Westchester	6,652	2.773	7.179	Greenburgh	Village
Island Park	Nassau	4,928	0.445	1.152	Hempstead	Village
Islandia	Suffolk	3,567	2.220	5.747	Islip	Village
Ithaca	Tompkins	32,108	5.39	13.954	None	City
Jamestown	Chautauqua	28,712	8.90	23.041	None	City
Jeffersonville	Sullivan	368	0.405	1.049	Callicoon	Village
Johnstown	Fulton	8,204	4.82	12.478	None	City
Johnson City	Broome	15,343	4.536	11.743	Union	Village
Jordan	Onondaga	1,192	1.146	2.967	Elbridge	Village
Kaser	Rockland	5,491	0.172	0.445	Ramapo	Village
Kenmore	Erie	15,205	1.435	3.715	Tonawanda	Village
Kensington	Nassau	1,226	0.254	0.658	North Hempstead	Village
Kinderhook	Columbia	1,170	2.104	5.447	Kinderhook	Village
Kings Point	Nassau	5,619	3.355	8.686	North Hempstead	Village
Kingston	Ulster	24,069	7.48	19.365	None	City
Kiryas Joel	Orange	32,954	1.462	3.785	Palm Tree	Coterminous Town-Village
Lacona	Oswego	657	1.110	2.874	Sandy Creek	Village
Lackawanna	Erie	19,949	6.55	16.957	None	City
Lake George	Warren	1,008	0.586	1.517	Lake George	Village
Lake Grove	Suffolk	11,072	2.947	7.629	Brookhaven	Village
Lake Placid	Essex	2,205	1.371	3.549	North Elba	Village
Lake Success	Nassau	2,828	1.845	4.777	North Hempstead	Village
Lakewood	Chautauqua	3,002	1.976	5.116	Busti	Village
Lancaster	Erie	10,027	2.698	6.985	Lancaster	Village
Lansing	Tompkins	3,648	4.610	11.935	Lansing	Village
Larchmont	Westchester	6,630	1.077	2.788	Mamaroneck	Village
Lattingtown	Nassau	1,881	3.755	9.721	Oyster Bay	Village
Laurel Hollow	Nassau	1,940	2.958	7.658	Oyster Bay	Village
Laurens	Otsego	185	0.128	0.331	Laurens	Village
Lawrence	Nassau	6,809	3.719	9.628	Hempstead	Village
Le Roy	Genesee	4,300	2.688	6.959	Le Roy	Village
Leicester	Livingston	440	0.367	0.950	Leicester	Village
Lewiston	Niagara	2,531	1.097	2.840	Lewiston	Village
Liberty	Sullivan	4,700	2.602	6.736	Liberty	Village
Lima	Livingston	2,094	1.346	3.485	Lima	Village
Lindenhurst	Suffolk	27,148	3.760	9.734	Babylon	Village
Lisle	Broome	348	0.936	2.423	Lisle	Village
Little Falls	Herkimer	4,605	3.84	9.941	None	City
Little Valley	Cattaraugus	1,058	1.002	2.594	Little Valley	Village
Liverpool	Onondaga	2,242	0.757	1.960	Salina	Village
Livonia	Livingston	1,472	1.007	2.607	Livonia	Village
Lloyd Harbor	Suffolk	3,571	9.363	24.240	Huntington	Village
Lockport	Niagara	20,876	8.40	21.747	None	City
Lodi	Seneca	254	0.551	1.426	Lodi	Village
Long Beach	Nassau	35,029	2.22	5.747	None	City
Lowville	Lewis	3,272	1.911	4.947	Lowville	Village
Lynbrook	Nassau	20,438	2.014	5.214	Hempstead	Village
Lyndonville	Orleans	771	1.024	2.651	Yates	Village
Lyons Falls	Lewis	570	0.971	2.514	Lyonsdale & West Turin	Village
Madison	Madison	311	0.502	1.300	Madison	Village
Malone	Franklin	5,483	3.111	8.054	Malone	Village
Malverne	Nassau	8,560	1.058	2.739	Hempstead	Village
Mamaroneck	Westchester	20,151	3.170	8.207	Mamaroneck & Rye	Village
Manchester	Ontario	1,640	1.176	3.045	Manchester	Village
Manlius	Onondaga	4,662	1.785	4.621	Manlius	Village
Mannsville	Jefferson	297	0.897	2.322	Ellisburg	Village
Manorhaven	Nassau	6,956	0.465	1.204	North Hempstead	Village
Marathon	Cortland	892	1.130	2.925	Marathon	Village
Marcellus	Onondaga	1,745	0.622	1.610	Marcellus	Village
Margaretville	Delaware	514	0.684	1.771	Middletown	Village
Massapequa Park	Nassau	17,109	2.210	5.721	Oyster Bay	Village
Massena	St. Lawrence	10,151	4.524	11.712	Louisville, Massena & Norfolk	Village
Matinecock	Nassau	847	2.658	6.881	Oyster Bay	Village
Maybrook	Orange	3,150	1.354	3.505	Hamptonburgh & Montgomery	Village
Mayfield	Fulton	780	0.907	2.348	Mayfield	Village
Mayville	Chautauqua	1,442	1.991	5.154	Chautauqua	Village
McGraw	Cortland	972	0.987	2.555	Cortlandville	Village
Mechanicville	Saratoga	5,163	0.84	2.175	None	City
Medina	Orleans	6,047	3.299	8.541	Ridgeway & Shelby	Village
Menands	Albany	4,554	3.058	7.917	Colonie	Village
Meridian	Cayuga	287	0.691	1.789	Cato	Village
Mexico	Oswego	1,531	2.145	5.553	Mexico	Village
Middleburgh	Schoharie	1,131	1.247	3.228	Middleburgh	Village
Middleport	Niagara	1,729	0.872	2.258	Hartland & Royalton	Village
Middletown	Orange	30,345	5.31	13.747	None	City
Middleville	Herkimer	407	0.765	1.981	Fairfield & Newport	Village
Milford	Otsego	367	0.424	1.098	Milford	Village
Mill Neck	Nassau	1,054	2.609	6.754	Oyster Bay	Village
Millbrook	Dutchess	1,455	1.931	4.999	Washington	Village
Millerton	Dutchess	903	0.618	1.600	North East	Village
Millport	Chemung	301	0.348	0.901	Veteran	Village
Mineola	Nassau	20,800	1.880	4.867	Hempstead & North Hempstead	Village
Minoa	Onondaga	3,657	1.273	3.296	Manlius	Village
Mohawk	Herkimer	2,415	0.876	2.268	German Flatts	Village
Monroe	Orange	9,343	3.453	8.939	Monroe	Village
Montebello	Rockland	4,507	4.346	11.251	Ramapo	Village
Montgomery	Orange	3,834	1.406	3.640	Montgomery	Village
Monticello	Sullivan	7,173	3.985	10.317	Thompson	Village
Montour Falls	Schuyler	1,635	3.008	7.787	Dix & Montour	Village
Moravia	Cayuga	1,224	1.703	4.409	Moravia	Village
Morris	Otsego	486	0.746	1.931	Morris	Village
Morrisville	Madison	1,633	1.153	2.985	Eaton	Village
Mount Kisco	Westchester	10,959	3.035	7.857	Mount Kisco	Coterminous Town-Village
Mount Morris	Livingston	2,898	2.048	5.302	Mount Morris	Village
Mount Vernon	Westchester	73,893	4.39	11.365	None	City
Munnsville	Madison	454	0.849	2.198	Stockbridge	Village
Munsey Park	Nassau	2,809	0.518	1.341	North Hempstead	Village
Muttontown	Nassau	3,512	6.063	15.697	Oyster Bay	Village
Naples	Ontario	931	0.985	2.550	Naples	Village
Nassau	Rensselaer	1,103	0.699	1.810	Nassau & Schodack	Village
Nelliston	Montgomery	555	1.105	2.861	Palatine	Village
Nelsonville	Putnam	624	1.034	2.677	Philipstown	Village
New Berlin	Chenango	901	1.066	2.760	New Berlin	Village
New Hartford	Oneida	1,859	0.617	1.597	New Hartford	Village
New Hempstead	Rockland	5,463	2.853	7.386	Ramapo	Village
New Hyde Park	Nassau	10,257	0.860	2.226	Hempstead & North Hempstead	Village
New Paltz	Ulster	7,324	1.715	4.440	New Paltz	Village
New Rochelle	Westchester	79,726	10.29	26.640	None	City
New Square	Rockland	9,679	0.367	0.950	Ramapo	Village
New York City	Bronx, Kings, New York, Queens, Richmond	8,804,190	300.46	777.861	Boroughs of The Bronx, Brooklyn, Manhattan, Queens, and Staten Island	City
New York Mills	Oneida	3,244	1.180	3.055	New Hartford & Whitestown	Village
Newark	Wayne	9,017	5.406	13.996	Arcadia	Village
Newark Valley	Tioga	928	0.988	2.558	Newark Valley	Village
Newburgh	Orange	28,856	3.81	9.864	None	City
Newport	Herkimer	543	0.526	1.362	Newport	Village
Niagara Falls	Niagara	48,671	14.09	36.478	None	City
Nichols	Tioga	457	0.518	1.341	Nichols	Village
Nissequogue	Suffolk	1,564	3.782	9.791	Smithtown	Village
North Collins	Erie	1,247	0.801	2.074	North Collins	Village
North Haven	Suffolk	1,162	2.713	7.024	Southampton	Village
North Hills	Nassau	5,464	2.759	7.143	North Hempstead	Village
North Hornell	Steuben	732	0.498	1.289	Hornellsville	Village
North Syracuse	Onondaga	6,739	1.958	5.069	Cicero & Clay	Village
North Tonawanda	Niagara	30,496	10.09	26.122	None	City
Northport	Suffolk	7,347	2.308	5.975	Huntington	Village
Northville	Fulton	993	1.039	2.690	Northampton	Village
Norwich	Chenango	7,051	2.12	5.488	None	City
Norwood	St. Lawrence	1,552	2.095	5.424	Norfolk & Potsdam	Village
Nunda	Livingston	1,169	0.993	2.571	Nunda	Village
Nyack	Rockland	7,265	0.770	1.993	Clarkstown & Orangetown	Village
Oakfield	Genesee	1,812	0.661	1.711	Oakfield	Village
Ocean Beach	Suffolk	153	0.141	0.365	Islip	Village
Odessa	Schuyler	517	1.137	2.944	Catharine & Montour	Village
Ogdensburg	St. Lawrence	10,064	4.96	12.841	None	City
Old Brookville	Nassau	2,020	3.999	10.353	Oyster Bay	Village
Old Field	Suffolk	893	2.070	5.359	Brookhaven	Village
Old Westbury	Nassau	4,289	8.573	22.195	North Hempstead & Oyster Bay	Village
Olean	Cattaraugus	13,937	5.90	15.275	None	City
Oneida	Madison	10,329	22.05	57.085	None	City
Oneida Castle	Oneida	586	0.514	1.331	Vernon	Village
Oneonta	Otsego	13,079	4.36	11.288	None	City
Orchard Park	Erie	3,108	1.346	3.485	Orchard Park	Village
Oriskany	Oneida	1,315	0.792	2.050	Whitestown	Village
Oriskany Falls	Oneida	658	0.506	1.310	Augusta	Village
Ossining	Westchester	27,551	3.149	8.152	Ossining	Village
Oswego	Oswego	16,921	7.61	19.702	None	City
Otego	Otsego	875	1.159	3.001	Otego	Village
Otisville	Orange	969	0.764	1.978	Mount Hope	Village
Ovid	Seneca	534	0.398	1.030	Ovid & Romulus	Village
Owego	Tioga	3,654	2.454	6.353	Owego	Village
Oxford	Chenango	1,330	1.785	4.621	Oxford	Village
Oyster Bay Cove	Nassau	2,265	4.187	10.840	Oyster Bay	Village
Painted Post	Steuben	1,768	1.272	3.293	Erwin	Village
Palatine Bridge	Montgomery	796	0.883	2.286	Palatine	Village
Palmyra	Wayne	3,305	1.347	3.487	Palmyra	Village
Panama	Chautauqua	475	2.200	5.696	Harmony	Village
Parish	Oswego	447	1.605	4.155	Parish	Village
Patchogue	Suffolk	12,408	2.255	5.838	Brookhaven	Village
Pawling	Dutchess	1,995	1.997	5.170	Pawling	Village
Peekskill	Westchester	25,431	4.34	11.236	None	City
Pelham	Westchester	7,326	0.829	2.146	Pelham	Village
Pelham Manor	Westchester	5,752	1.343	3.477	Pelham	Village
Penn Yan	Yates	5,056	2.381	6.164	Benton, Jerusalem & Milo	Village
Perry	Wyoming	3,536	2.337	6.050	Castile & Perry	Village
Phelps	Ontario	1,851	1.172	3.034	Phelps	Village
Philadelphia	Jefferson	1,098	0.904	2.340	Philadelphia	Village
Philmont	Columbia	1,377	1.187	3.073	Claverack	Village
Phoenix	Oswego	2,226	1.171	3.032	Schroeppel	Village
Piermont	Rockland	2,517	0.679	1.758	Orangetown	Village
Pittsford	Monroe	1,419	0.673	1.742	Pittsford	Village
Plandome	Nassau	1,448	0.495	1.282	North Hempstead	Village
Plandome Heights	Nassau	1,009	0.181	0.469	North Hempstead	Village
Plandome Manor	Nassau	793	0.484	1.253	North Hempstead	Village
Plattsburgh	Clinton	19,841	5.04	13.048	None	City
Pleasantville	Westchester	7,513	1.824	4.722	Mount Pleasant	Village
Poland	Herkimer	464	0.543	1.406	Newport & Russia	Village
Pomona	Rockland	3,824	2.397	6.206	Haverstraw & Ramapo	Village
Poquott	Suffolk	903	0.439	1.137	Brookhaven	Village
Port Byron	Cayuga	1,101	0.979	2.535	Mentz	Village
Port Chester	Westchester	31,693	2.331	6.035	Rye	Village
Port Dickinson	Broome	1,699	0.637	1.649	Dickinson	Village
Port Jefferson	Suffolk	7,962	3.057	7.914	Brookhaven	Village
Port Jervis	Orange	8,775	2.53	6.550	None	City
Port Leyden	Lewis	554	0.615	1.592	Leyden & Lyonsdale	Village
Port Washington North	Nassau	3,160	0.478	1.237	North Hempstead	Village
Portville	Cattaraugus	892	0.802	2.076	Portville	Village
Potsdam	St. Lawrence	8,312	4.447	11.513	Potsdam	Village
Poughkeepsie	Dutchess	31,577	5.14	13.307	None	City
Pulaski	Oswego	2,186	3.484	9.020	Richland	Village
Quogue	Suffolk	1,662	4.191	10.850	Southampton	Village
Ravena	Albany	3,271	1.467	3.798	Coeymans	Village
Red Creek	Wayne	495	0.909	2.353	Wolcott	Village
Red Hook	Dutchess	1,975	1.102	2.853	Red Hook	Village
Remsen	Oneida	431	0.372	0.963	Remsen & Trenton	Village
Rensselaer	Rensselaer	9,210	3.18	8.233	None	City
Rensselaer Falls	St. Lawrence	361	0.291	0.753	Canton	Village
Rhinebeck	Dutchess	2,697	1.523	3.943	Rhinebeck	Village
Richburg	Allegany	401	0.900	2.330	Bolivar & Wirt	Village
Richfield Springs	Otsego	1,050	1.007	2.607	Richfield	Village
Richmondville	Schoharie	858	1.846	4.779	Richmondville	Village
Richville	St. Lawrence	234	0.738	1.911	De Kalb	Village
Riverside	Steuben	423	0.301	0.779	Corning	Village
Rochester	Monroe	211,328	35.76	92.579	None	City
Rockville Centre	Nassau	26,016	3.247	8.406	Hempstead	Village
Rome	Oneida	32,127	74.85	193.779	None	City
Roslyn	Nassau	2,988	0.645	1.670	North Hempstead	Village
Roslyn Estates	Nassau	1,318	0.438	1.134	North Hempstead	Village
Roslyn Harbor	Nassau	1,067	1.186	3.070	North Hempstead & Oyster Bay	Village
Round Lake	Saratoga	828	1.123	2.907	Malta	Village
Rouses Point	Clinton	2,195	1.761	4.559	Champlain	Village
Rushville	Yates, Ontario	651	0.639	1.654	Gorham & Potter	Village
Russell Gardens	Nassau	978	0.174	0.450	North Hempstead	Village
Rye	Westchester	16,592	5.85	15.145	None	City
Rye Brook	Westchester	10,047	3.433	8.888	Rye	Village
Sackets Harbor	Jefferson	1,351	2.205	5.709	Hounsfield	Village
Saddle Rock	Nassau	989	0.246	0.637	North Hempstead	Village
Sag Harbor	Suffolk	2,772	1.804	4.670	East Hampton & Southampton	Village
Sagaponack	Suffolk	770	4.414	11.427	Southampton	Village
Salamanca	Cattaraugus	5,929	5.99	15.508	None	City
Saltaire	Suffolk	113	0.233	0.603	Islip	Village
Sands Point	Nassau	2,712	4.230	10.951	North Hempstead	Village
Sandy Creek	Oswego	646	1.351	3.498	Sandy Creek	Village
Saranac Lake	Essex, Franklin	4,887	2.779	7.195	Harrietstown, North Elba & St. Armand	Village
Saratoga Springs	Saratoga	28,491	28.07	72.670	None	City
Saugerties	Ulster	3,899	1.784	4.619	Saugerties	Village
Savona	Steuben	672	1.040	2.692	Bath	Village
Scarsdale	Westchester	18,253	6.660	17.242	Scarsdale	Coterminous Town-Village
Schaghticoke	Rensselaer	527	0.758	1.962	Schaghticoke	Village
Schenectady	Schenectady	67,047	10.81	27.986	None	City
Schoharie	Schoharie	916	1.658	4.292	Schoharie	Village
Schuylerville	Saratoga	1,370	0.533	1.380	Saratoga	Village
Scotia	Schenectady	7,272	1.685	4.362	Glenville	Village
Scottsville	Monroe	2,009	1.082	2.801	Wheatland	Village
Sea Cliff	Nassau	5,062	1.115	2.887	Oyster Bay	Village
Sharon Springs	Schoharie	483	1.827	4.730	Sharon	Village
Sherburne	Chenango	1,360	1.519	3.933	Sherburne	Village
Sherman	Chautauqua	649	0.854	2.211	Sherman	Village
Sherrill	Oneida	3,077	2.31	5.980	Vernon	City
Shoreham	Suffolk	561	0.448	1.160	Brookhaven	Village
Shortsville	Ontario	1,400	0.668	1.729	Manchester	Village
Sidney	Delaware	3,697	2.374	6.146	Sidney	Village
Silver Creek	Chautauqua	2,617	1.160	3.003	Hanover	Village
Silver Springs	Wyoming	689	0.952	2.465	Gainesville	Village
Sinclairville	Chautauqua	579	1.612	4.173	Charlotte & Gerry	Village
Skaneateles	Onondaga	2,533	1.414	3.661	Skaneateles	Village
Sleepy Hollow	Westchester	9,986	2.161	5.595	Mount Pleasant	Village
Sloan	Erie	3,775	0.786	2.035	Cheektowaga	Village
Sloatsburg	Rockland	3,036	2.467	6.387	Ramapo	Village
Smyrna	Chenango	197	0.244	0.632	Smyrna	Village
Sodus	Wayne	1,667	0.941	2.436	Sodus	Village
Sodus Point	Wayne	822	1.468	3.801	Sodus	Village
Solvay	Onondaga	6,645	1.654	4.282	Geddes	Village
South Blooming Grove	Orange	3,973	4.674	12.101	Blooming Grove	Village
South Corning	Steuben	1,108	0.617	1.597	Corning	Village
South Dayton	Cattaraugus	541	1.006	2.604	Dayton	Village
South Floral Park	Nassau	1,741	0.096	0.249	Hempstead	Village
South Glens Falls	Saratoga	3,744	1.358	3.516	Moreau	Village
Southampton	Suffolk	4,550	6.422	16.626	Southampton	Village
Speculator	Hamilton	406	44.571	115.390	Lake Pleasant	Village
Spencer	Tioga	719	1.015	2.628	Spencer	Village
Spencerport	Monroe	3,685	1.337	3.461	Ogden	Village
Spring Valley	Rockland	33,066	2.016	5.219	Clarkstown & Ramapo	Village
Springville	Erie	4,225	3.672	9.506	Concord	Village
St. Johnsville	Montgomery	1,643	0.878	2.273	St. Johnsville	Village
Stamford	Delaware	1,040	1.333	3.451	Harpersfield & Stamford	Village
Stewart Manor	Nassau	1,992	0.210	0.544	Hempstead	Village
Stillwater	Saratoga	1,754	1.258	3.257	Stillwater	Village
Suffern	Rockland	11,441	2.089	5.408	Ramapo	Village
Sylvan Beach	Oneida	890	0.687	1.779	Vienna	Village
Syracuse	Onondaga	148,620	25.06	64.878	None	City
Tannersville	Greene	568	1.164	3.013	Hunter	Village
Tarrytown	Westchester	11,860	2.926	7.575	Greenburgh	Village
Theresa	Jefferson	752	1.252	3.241	Theresa	Village
Thomaston	Nassau	2,759	0.408	1.056	North Hempstead	Village
Tivoli	Dutchess	1,012	1.610	4.168	Red Hook	Village
Tonawanda	Erie	15,129	3.80	9.838	None	City
Troy	Rensselaer	51,401	10.36	26.821	None	City
Trumansburg	Tompkins	1,714	1.387	3.591	Ulysses	Village
Tuckahoe	Westchester	7,084	0.598	1.548	Eastchester	Village
Tully	Onondaga	904	0.717	1.856	Tully	Village
Tupper Lake	Franklin	3,282	2.090	5.411	Tupper Lake	Village
Turin	Lewis	197	1.026	2.656	Turin	Village
Tuxedo	Orange	3,169	44.395	114.934	Tuxedo	Consolidated Town-Village
Tuxedo Park	Orange	645	2.655	6.874	Tuxedo	Village
Unadilla	Otsego	1,065	1.037	2.685	Unadilla	Village
Union Springs	Cayuga	1,075	1.737	4.497	Springport	Village
Unionville	Orange	592	0.310	0.803	Minisink	Village
Upper Brookville	Nassau	1,786	4.319	11.181	Oyster Bay	Village
Upper Nyack	Rockland	2,015	1.222	3.164	Clarkstown	Village
Utica	Oneida	65,283	16.72	43.286	None	City
Valatie	Columbia	1,785	1.254	3.246	Kinderhook	Village
Valley Falls	Rensselaer	510	0.463	1.199	Pittstown & Schaghticoke	Village
Valley Stream	Nassau	40,634	3.482	9.015	Hempstead	Village
Vernon	Oneida	1,177	0.946	2.449	Vernon	Village
Victor	Ontario	2,744	1.373	3.555	Victor	Village
Victory	Saratoga	666	0.525	1.359	Saratoga	Village
Village of the Branch	Suffolk	1,735	0.948	2.454	Smithtown	Village
Voorheesville	Albany	2,841	2.139	5.538	New Scotland	Village
Waddington	St. Lawrence	937	2.180	5.644	Waddington	Village
Walden	Orange	6,818	1.968	5.095	Montgomery	Village
Walton	Delaware	2,885	1.541	3.989	Walton	Village
Wampsville	Madison	573	1.009	2.612	Lenox	Village
Wappingers Falls	Dutchess	6,103	1.108	2.869	Poughkeepsie & Wappinger	Village
Warsaw	Wyoming	3,646	4.106	10.630	Warsaw	Village
Warwick	Orange	6,652	2.417	6.257	Warwick	Village
Washingtonville	Orange	5,657	2.538	6.571	Blooming Grove	Village
Waterford	Saratoga	2,038	0.283	0.733	Waterford	Village
Waterloo	Seneca	4,810	2.157	5.584	Fayette, Seneca Falls & Waterloo	Village
Watertown	Jefferson	24,685	9.03	23.378	None	City
Waterville	Oneida	1,473	1.416	3.666	Marshall & Sangerfield	Village
Watervliet	Albany	10,375	1.34	3.469	None	City
Watkins Glen	Schuyler	1,863	1.559	4.036	Dix & Reading	Village
Waverly	Tioga	4,373	2.293	5.936	Barton	Village
Wayland	Steuben	1,680	1.130	2.925	Wayland	Village
Webster	Monroe	5,651	2.202	5.701	Webster	Village
Weedsport	Cayuga	1,788	0.976	2.527	Brutus	Village
Wellsburg	Chemung	490	0.568	1.470	Ashland	Village
Wellsville	Allegany	4,587	2.424	6.275	Wellsville	Village
Wesley Hills	Rockland	6,116	3.353	8.681	Ramapo	Village
West Carthage	Jefferson	1,780	1.297	3.358	Champion	Village
West Hampton Dunes	Suffolk	126	0.329	0.852	Southampton	Village
West Haverstraw	Rockland	10,678	1.519	3.933	Haverstraw	Village
West Winfield	Herkimer	733	0.911	2.358	Winfield	Village
Westbury	Nassau	15,864	2.374	6.146	North Hempstead	Village
Westfield	Chautauqua	2,910	3.822	9.895	Westfield	Village
Westhampton Beach	Suffolk	2,150	2.931	7.588	Southampton	Village
White Plains	Westchester	59,559	9.74	25.216	None	City
Whitehall	Washington	2,465	4.703	12.176	Whitehall	Village
Whitesboro	Oneida	3,612	1.050	2.718	Whitestown	Village
Whitney Point	Broome	960	1.043	2.700	Lisle & Triangle	Village
Williamsville	Erie	5,423	1.260	3.262	Amherst & Cheektowaga	Village
Williston Park	Nassau	7,591	0.626	1.621	North Hempstead	Village
Wilson	Niagara	1,247	0.813	2.105	Wilson	Village
Windsor	Broome	907	1.095	2.835	Windsor	Village
Wolcott	Wayne	1,556	1.948	5.043	Butler & Wolcott	Village
Woodbury	Orange	11,526	35.602	92.170	Woodbury	Village
Woodridge	Sullivan	747	1.603	4.150	Fallsburg	Village
Woodsburgh	Nassau	897	0.340	0.880	Hempstead	Village
Wurtsboro	Sullivan	1,124	1.266	3.278	Mamakating	Village
Wyoming	Wyoming	377	0.669	1.732	Middlebury	Village
Yonkers	Westchester	211,569	18.01	46.626	None	City
Yorkville	Oneida	2,657	0.671	1.737	Whitestown	Village
Youngstown	Niagara	1,859	1.097	2.840	Porter	Village

== Former villages ==
Listed below are former villages in the State of New York which either dissolved, consolidated or were acquired by another municipality between 1900 and 2023. During this period, over 65 villages had chosen dissolution. A former village does have the option to re-incorporate in the future, if the community chooses to do so. Unless otherwise specified, these communities are currently (or will be) hamlets and considered census-designated places by the U.S. Census Bureau.

Former villages in New York
Village	County	Town	End date	Successor
Altmar	Oswego	Albion	May 31, 2013	
Amchir	Orange	Wallkill	April 30, 1968	Annexed to the City of Middletown
Andes	Delaware	Andes	December 31, 2003	
Barkers Point	Nassau	North Hempstead	1912	Merged with the Village of Sands Point
Barneveld	Oneida	Trenton	December 31, 2017	
Belleville	Jefferson	Ellisburg	1930	
Bloomingdale	Essex	St. Armand	December 31, 1985	Hamlet
Bridgewater	Oneida	Bridgewater	December 31, 2014	
Brookfield	Madison	Brookfield	December 31, 1923	Hamlet
Charlotte	Monroe	Greece	December 31, 1915	Annexed to the City of Rochester
Cherry Creek	Chautauqua	Cherry Creek	December 31, 2017	
Downsville	Delaware	Colchester	September 21, 1950	
East Bloomfield	Ontario	East Bloomfield	March 27, 1990	Merged with Holcomb to become the Village of Bloomfield
East Randolph	Cattaraugus	Conewango & Randolph	December 31, 2011	
Eastwood	Onondaga	DeWitt & Salina	September 4, 1928	Annexed to the City of Syracuse
Edwards	St. Lawrence	Edwards	December 31, 2012	
Elizabethtown	Essex	Elizabethtown	December 31, 1980	
Fillmore	Allegany	Hume	December 31, 1994	
Forestport	Oneida	Forestport	December 31, 1938	Hamlet
Forestville	Chautauqua	Hanover	December 31, 2016	
Fort Covington	Franklin	Fort Covington	December 31, 1975	Fort Covington Hamlet
Fort Johnson	Montgomery	Amsterdam	December 31, 2023	
Friendship	Allegany	Friendship	December 31, 1977	
Harrisville	Lewis	Diana	December 31, 2018	
Henderson	Jefferson	Henderson	1933	
Hermon	St. Lawrence	Hermon	December 31, 2016	
Herrings	Jefferson	Wilna	March 31, 2017	
Holcomb	Ontario	East Bloomfield	March 27, 1990	Merged with East Bloomfield to become the Village of Bloomfield
Keeseville	Clinton & Essex	Au Sable & Chesterfield	December 31, 2014	
LaFargeville	Jefferson	Orleans	September 22, 1922	
Lansingburgh	Rensselaer	Lansingburgh	April 25, 1900	Annexed to the City of Troy
Limestone	Cattaraugus	Carrollton	December 31, 2010	
Lyons	Wayne	Lyons	December 31, 2015	
Macedon	Wayne	Macedon	March 31, 2017	
Marlboro	Ulster	Marlborough	September 5, 1922	
Mastic Beach	Suffolk	Brookhaven	December 31, 2017	
Mooers	Clinton	Mooers	March 31, 1994	
Morristown	St. Lawrence	Morristown	December 31, 2019	
Motts Point	Nassau	North Hempstead	1912	Merged with the Village of Sands Point
Newfield	Tompkins	Newfield	December 31, 1927	Newfield Hamlet
North Bangor	Franklin	Bangor	1939	Hamlet
Northville	Suffolk	Riverhead	1930	
North Pelham	Westchester	Pelham	June 1, 1975	Merged with the Village of Pelham
Old Forge	Herkimer	Webb	March 31, 1936	
Oramel	Allegany	Caneadea	1925	Hamlet
Perrysburg	Cattaraugus	Perrysburg	December 31, 2011	
Pike	Wyoming	Pike	December 31, 2009	
Pine Hill	Ulster	Shandaken	December 31, 1986	
Pine Valley	Suffolk	Southampton	December 31, 1991	Northampton CDP
Pleasant Valley	Dutchess	Pleasant Valley	September 30, 1926	
Port Henry	Essex	Moriah	March 31, 2017	
Prattsburgh	Steuben	Prattsburgh	September 22, 1972	
Prattsville	Greene	Prattsville	1900	
Prospect	Oneida	Trenton	December 31, 2015	
Randolph	Cattaraugus	Randolph	December 31, 2011	
Rifton	Ulster	Esopus	August 18, 1919	
Rosendale	Ulster	Rosendale	December 31, 1977	"Rosendale Village" until 2010, "Rosendale Hamlet" in 2010, "Rosendale" in 2020
Roxbury	Delaware	Roxbury	1900	Hamlet
Salem	Washington	Salem	March 31, 2016	
Savannah	Wayne	Savannah	December 31, 1979	
Schenevus	Otsego	Maryland	December 31, 1994	
Seneca Falls	Seneca	Seneca Falls	December 31, 2011	
South Nyack	Rockland	Orangetown	March 31, 2022	
Ticonderoga	Essex	Ticonderoga	December 31, 1993	
Union	Broome	Union	March 15, 1921	Annexed to the Village of Endicott
Van Etten	Chemung	Van Etten	December 31, 2018	
Village of The Landing	Suffolk	Smithtown	November 23, 1939	Part of the Smithtown CDP
Westport	Essex	Westport	December 31, 1992	
Woodhull	Steuben	Woodhull	December 31, 1986	Hamlet

== Extremes in size and population ==
The most populous and largest city by area in the state is by far New York City, home to 8,804,190 people and comprising just over 300 square miles (800 km^{2}) of land (468.87 square miles (1,210 km^{2}) including water). The least populous city is Sherrill, with just 3,071 inhabitants. The smallest city by area is Mechanicville, which covers 0.91 square miles (2.4 km^{2}) (of which 0.08 square miles (0.2 km^{2}) is water).

- Smallest village, by area: South Floral Park – 0.096 square miles (0.25 km^{2})
- Largest village, by area: Speculator – 44.571 square miles (115.44 km^{2})
- Smallest village, by population: Dering Harbor – 50 (2020)
- Largest village, by population: Hempstead – 59,169 (2020)

== Gallery ==
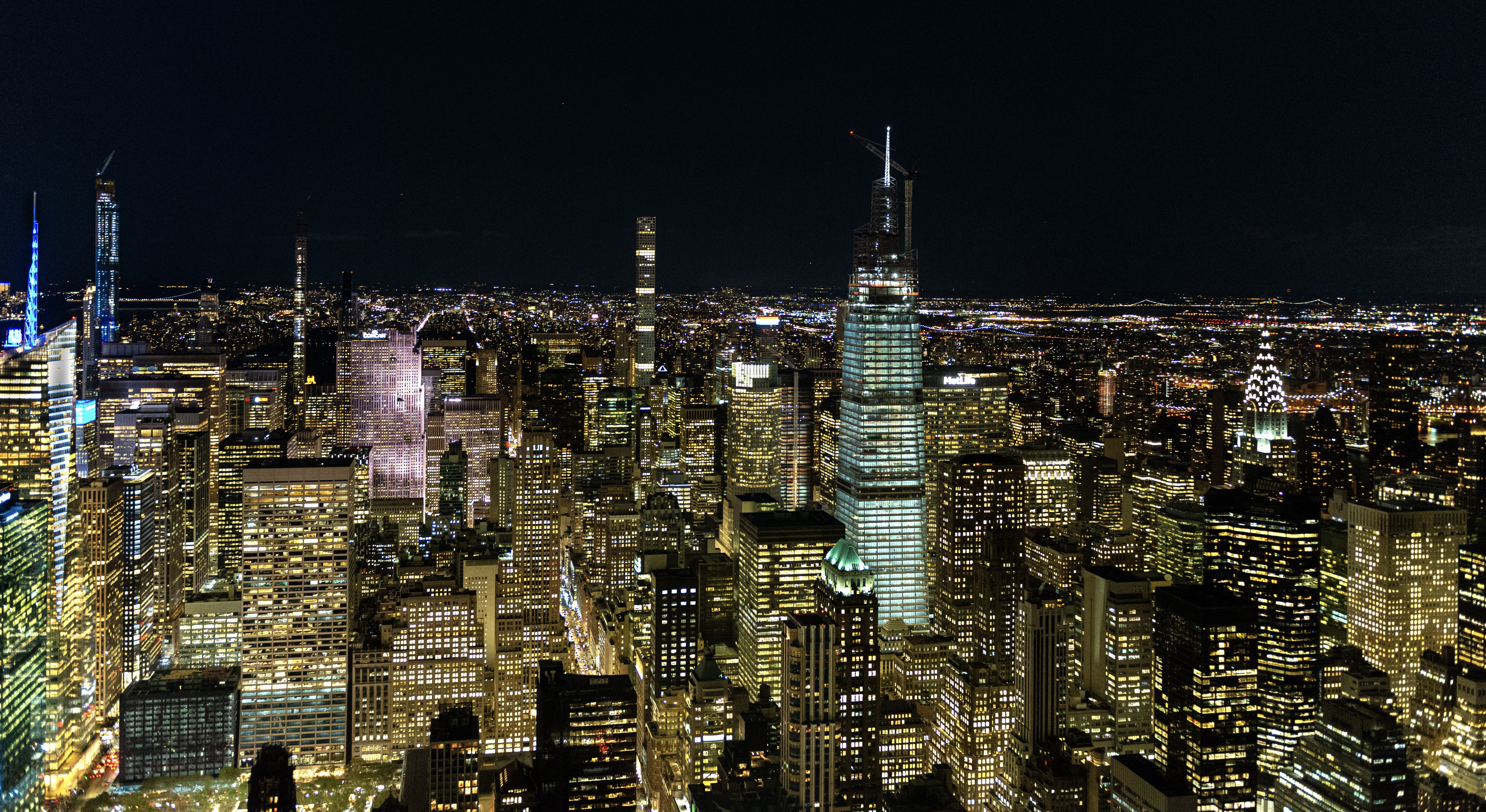
New York City, largest city in New York and the United States, photographed at night.

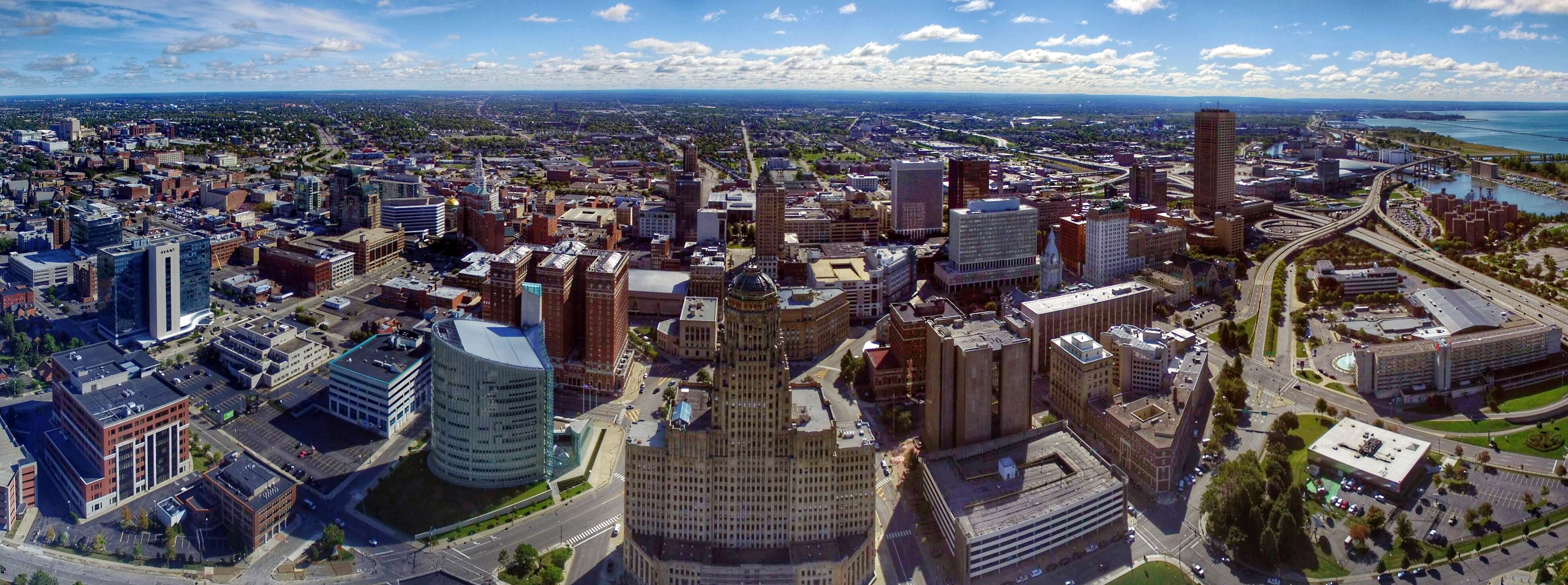
Buffalo, the second largest city in New York

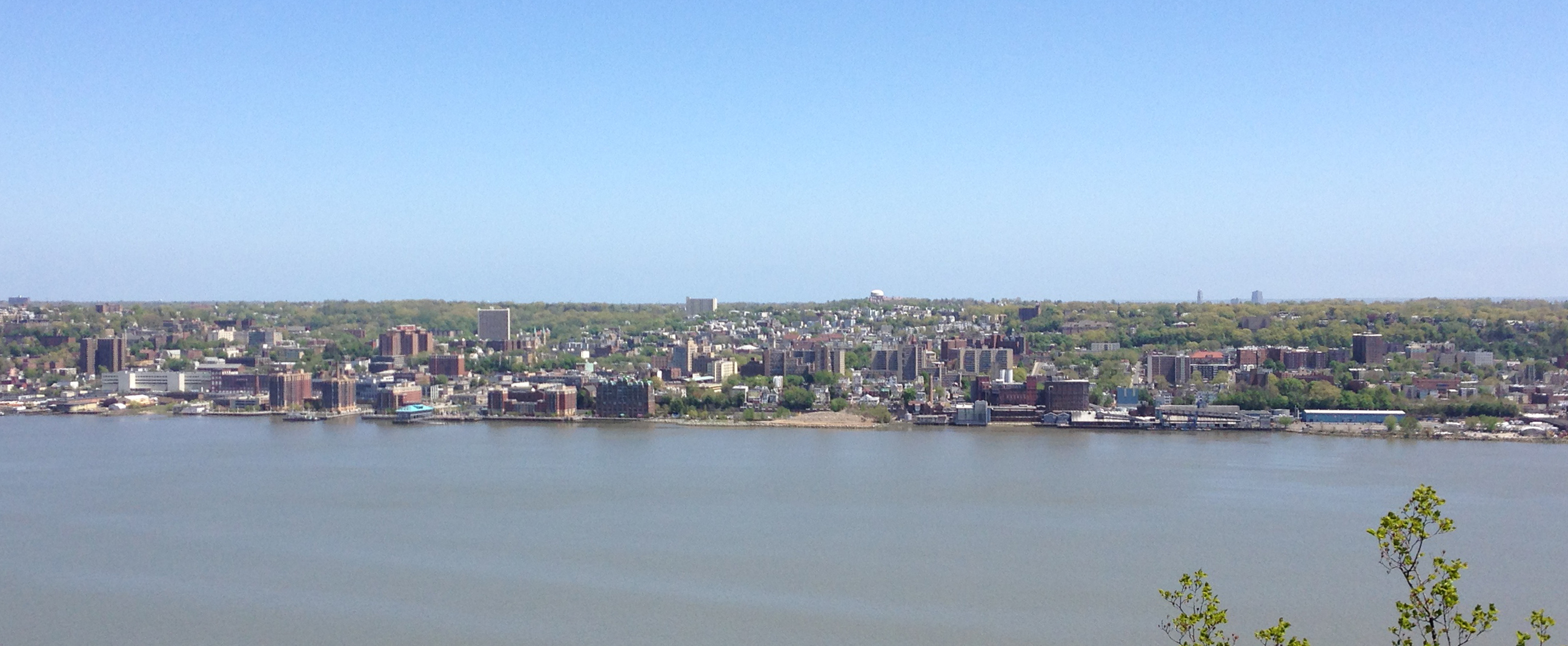
Yonkers, the third largest.

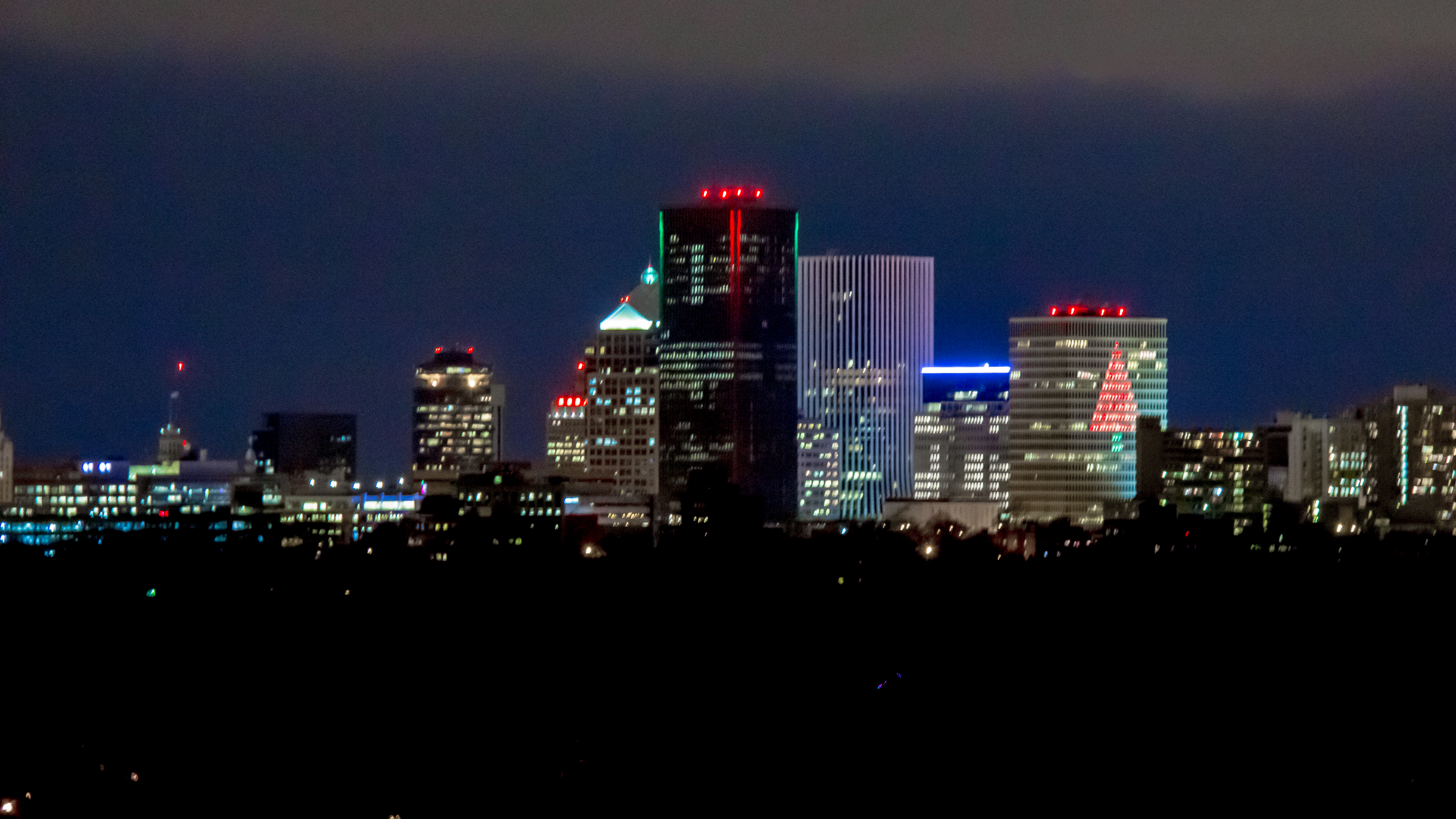
Rochester, the fourth largest.

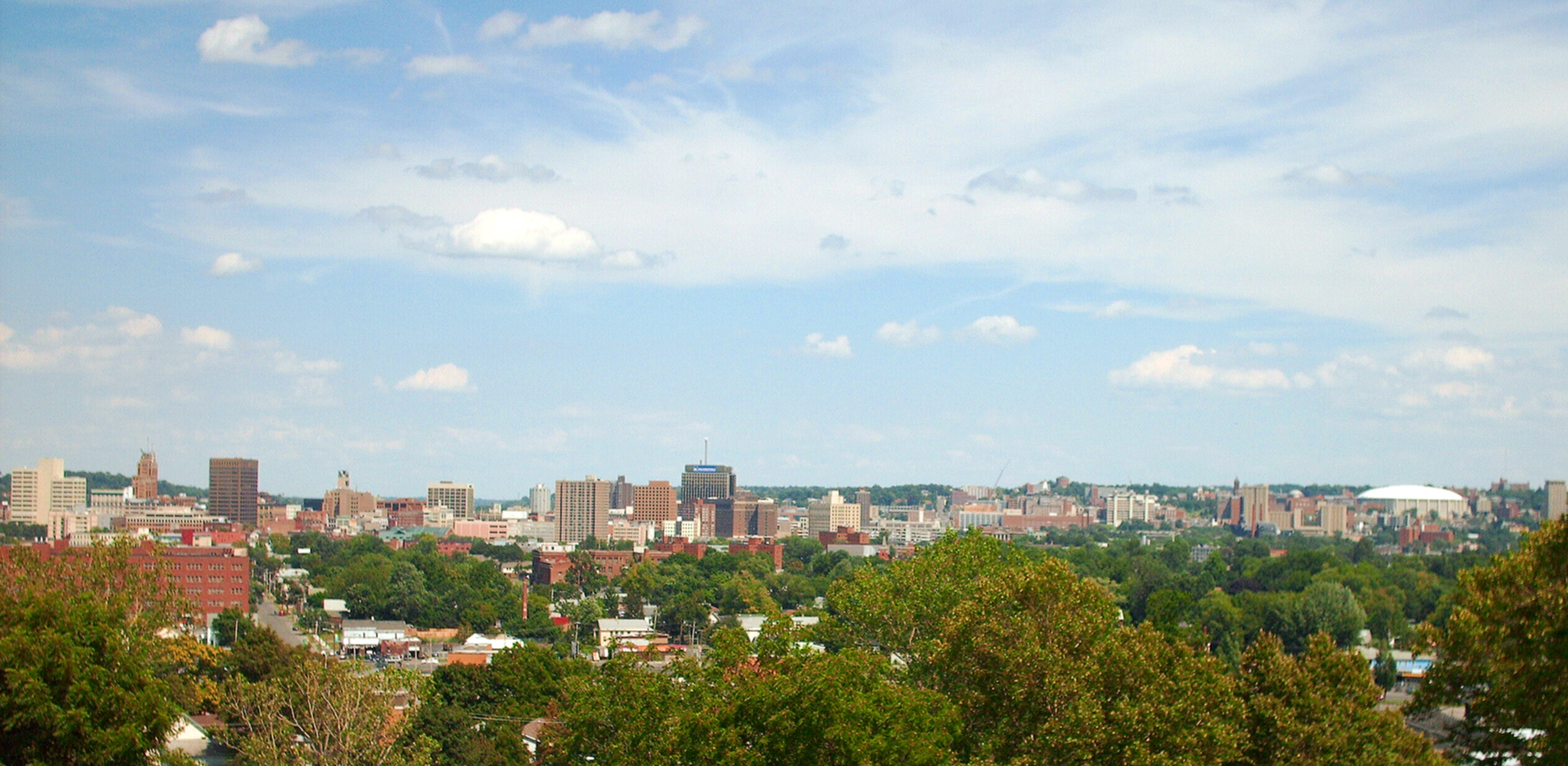
Syracuse, the fifth largest.

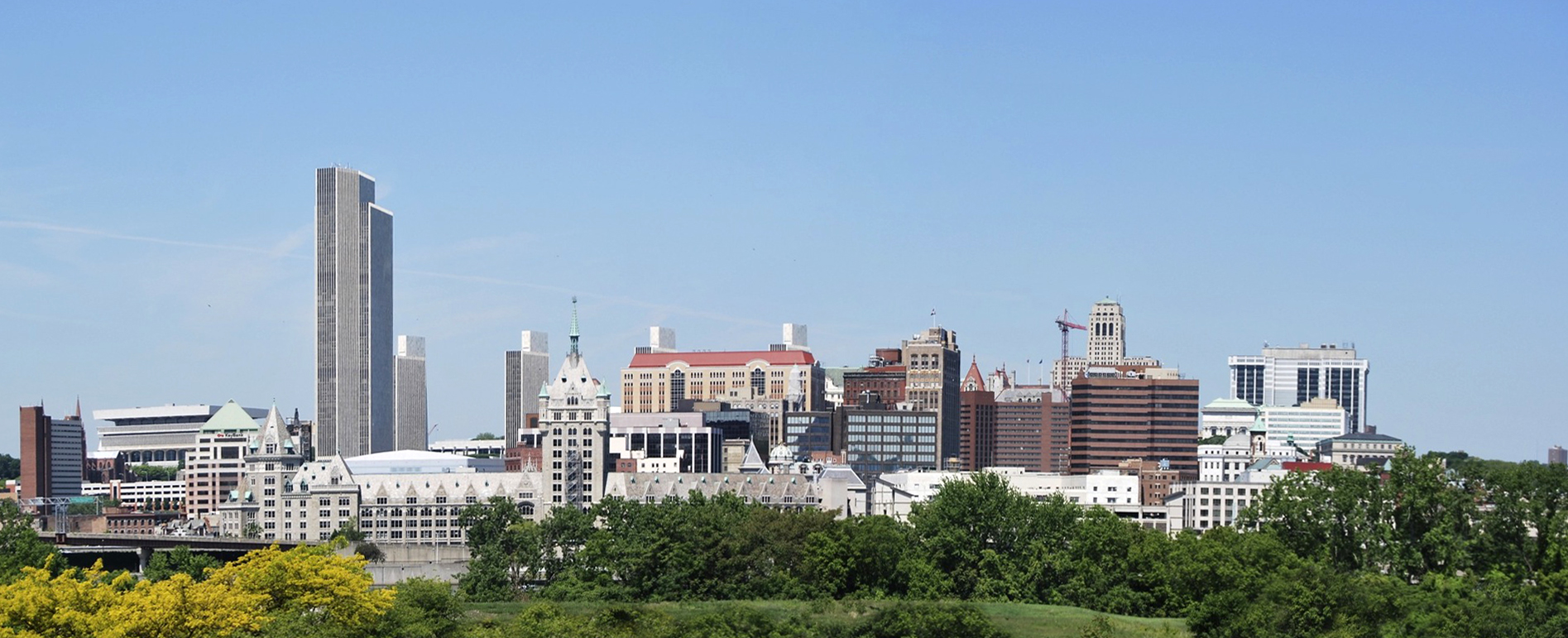
Albany, the sixth largest and capital of New York.

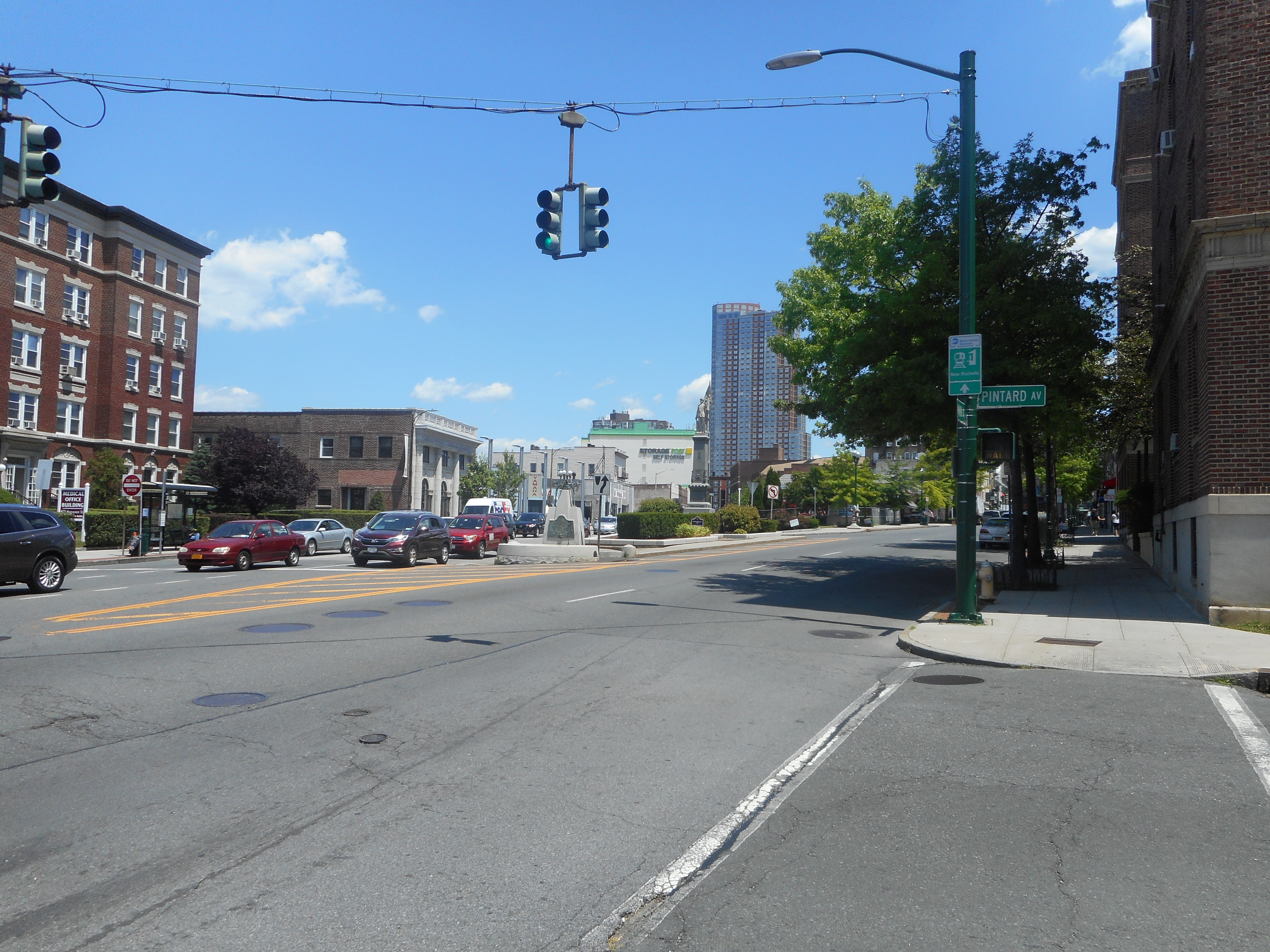
New Rochelle, the seventh largest.

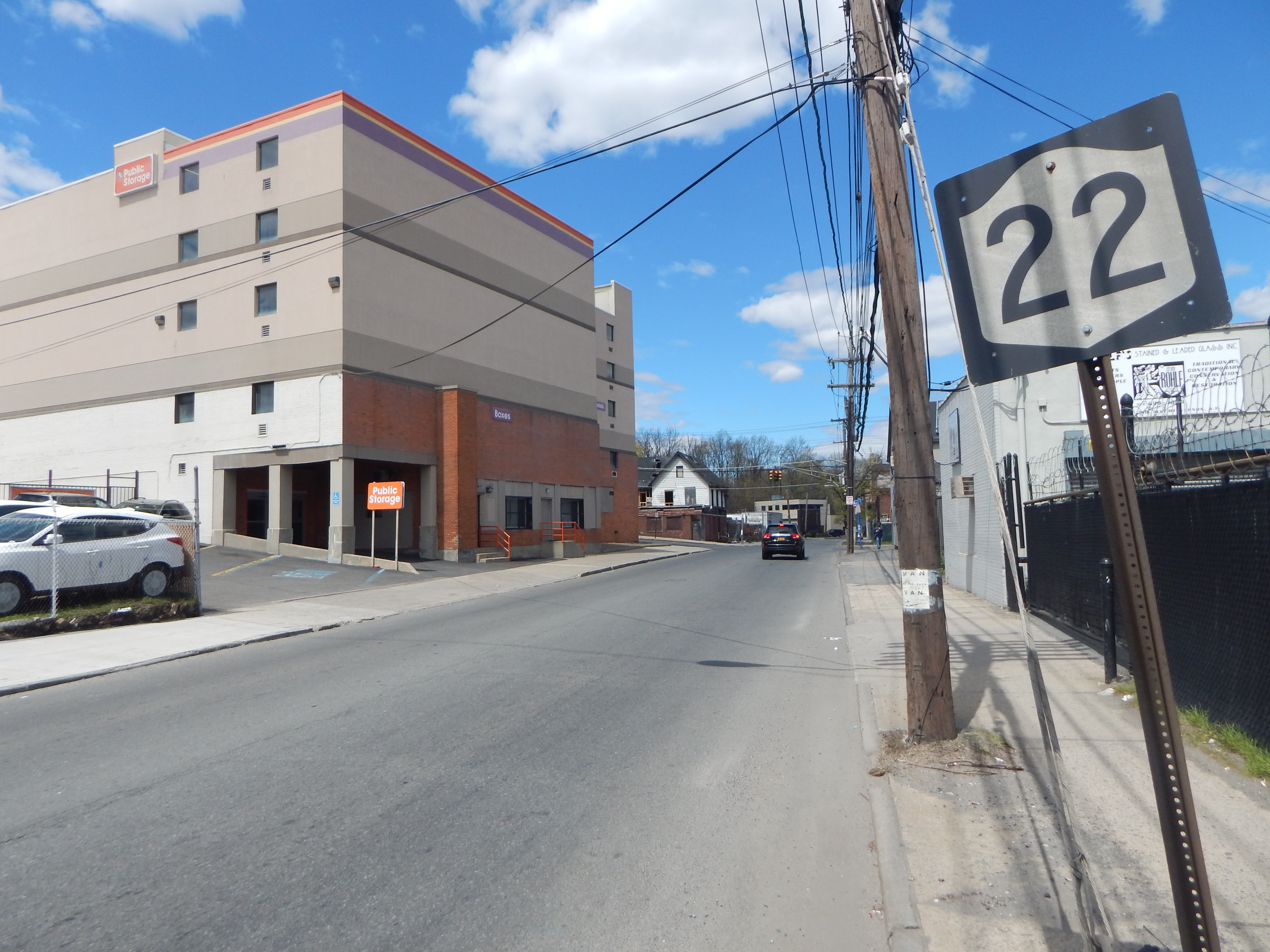
Mount Vernon, the eighth largest

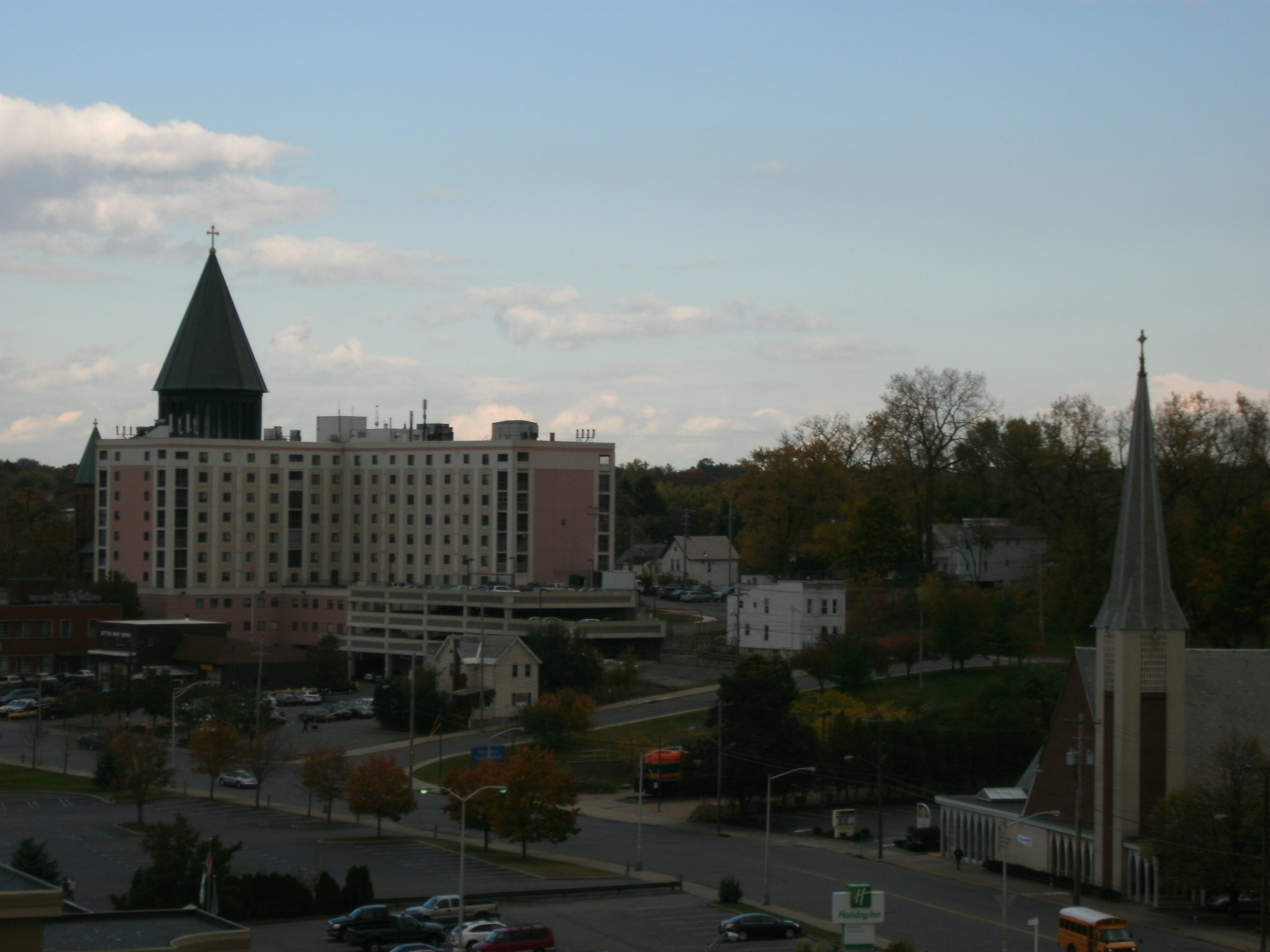
Schenectady, the ninth largest.

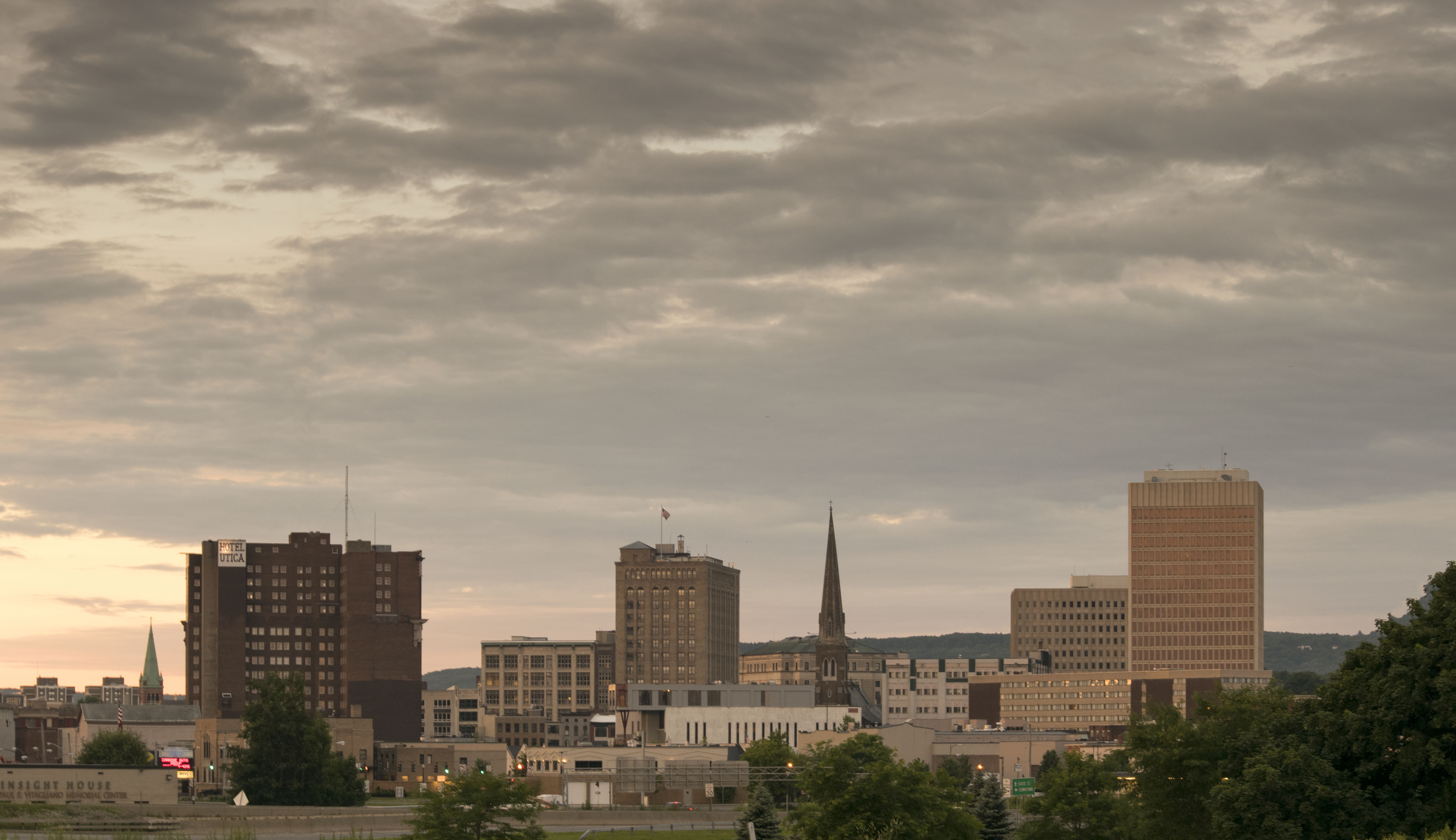
Utica, the tenth largest

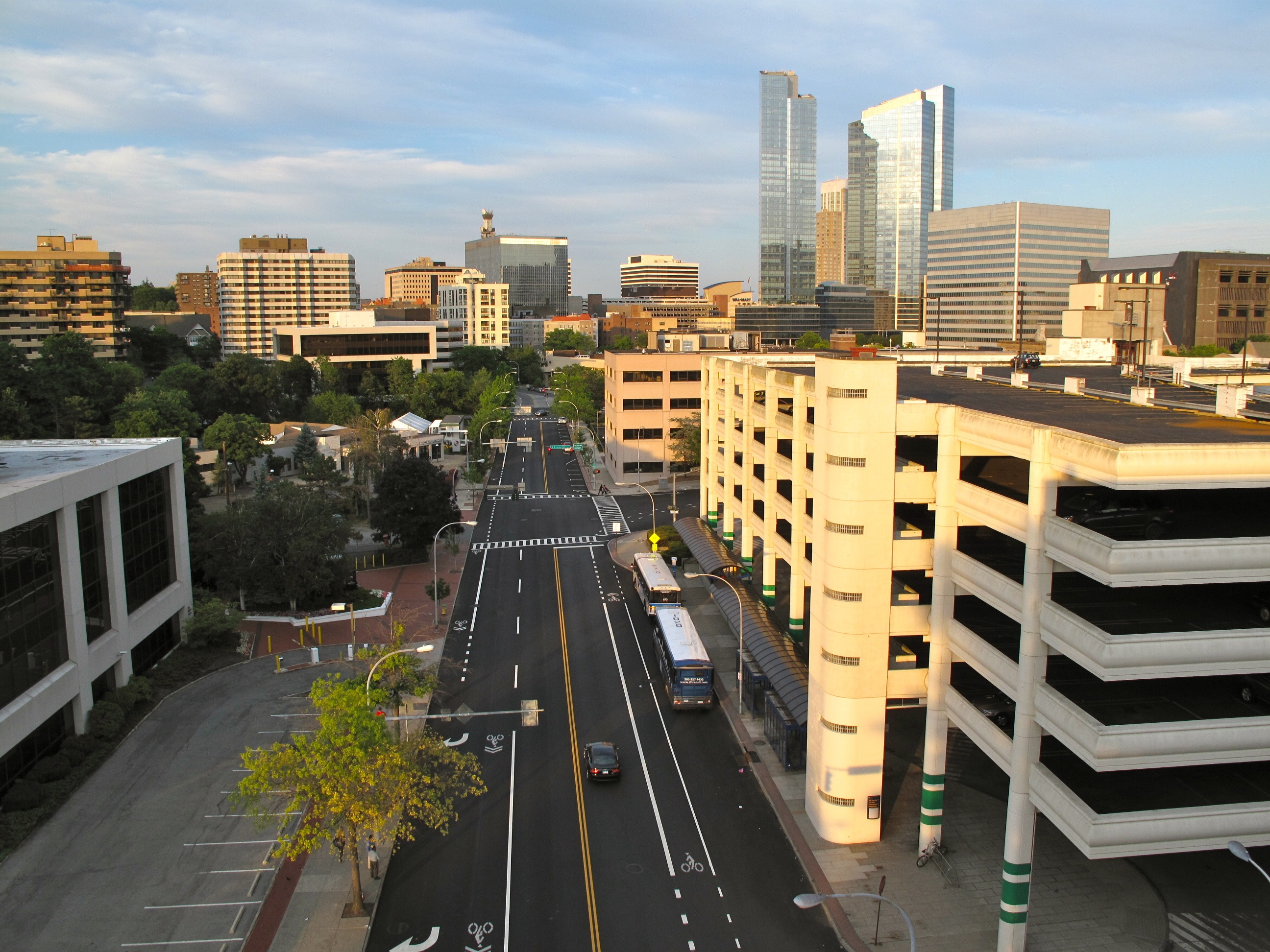
White Plains, the eleventh largest.

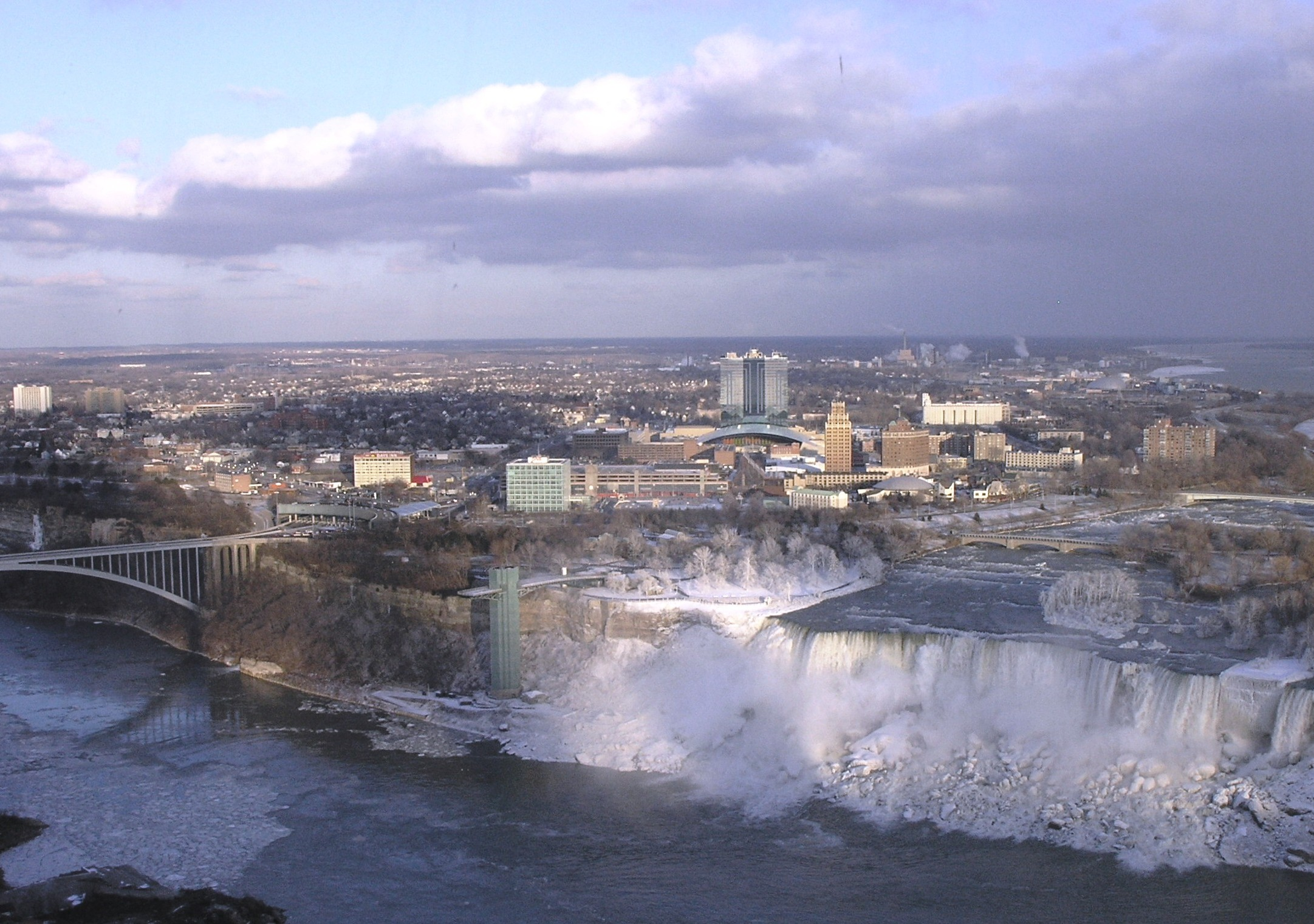
Niagara Falls, the twelfth largest.

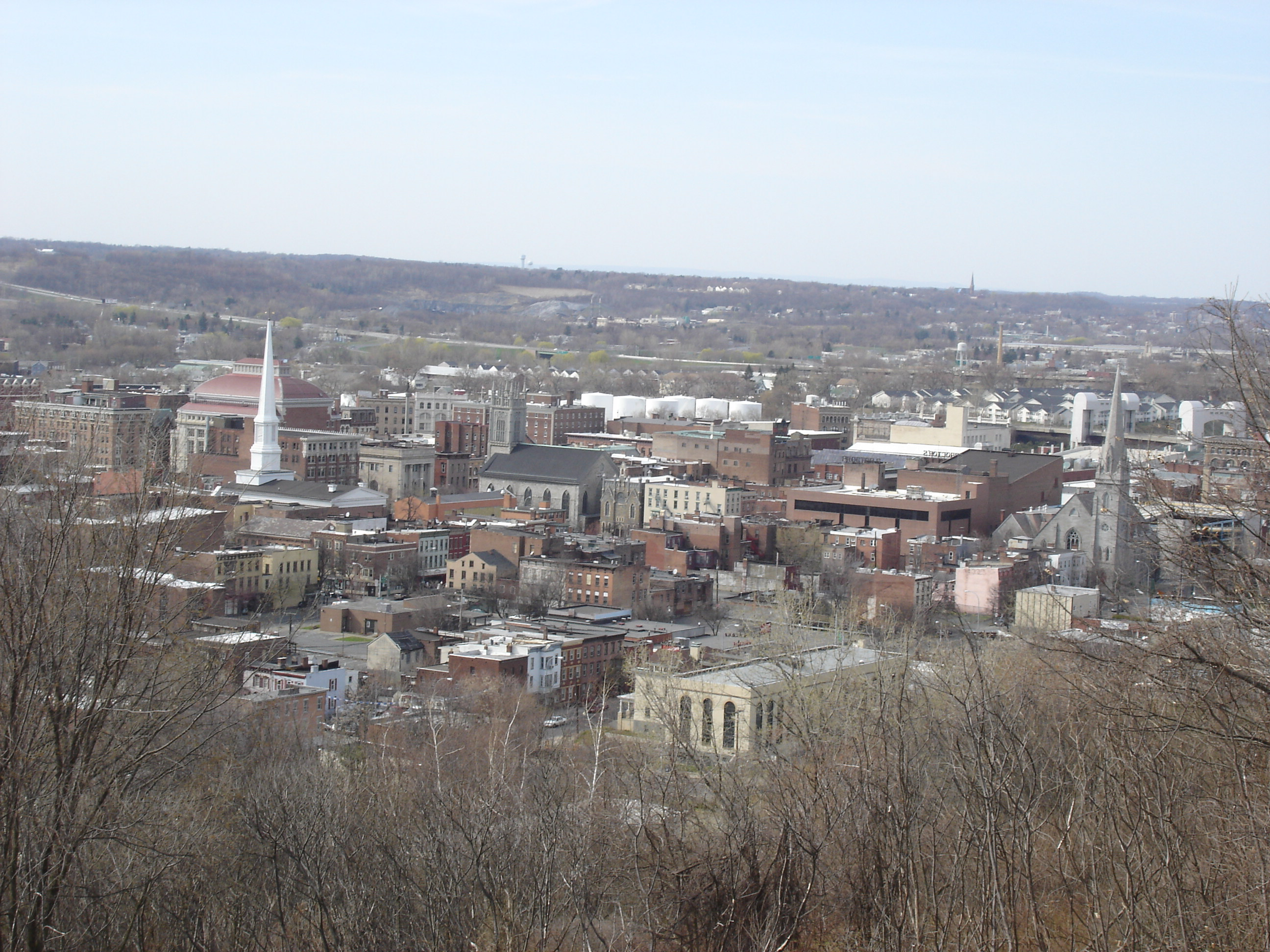
Troy, the thirteenth largest.

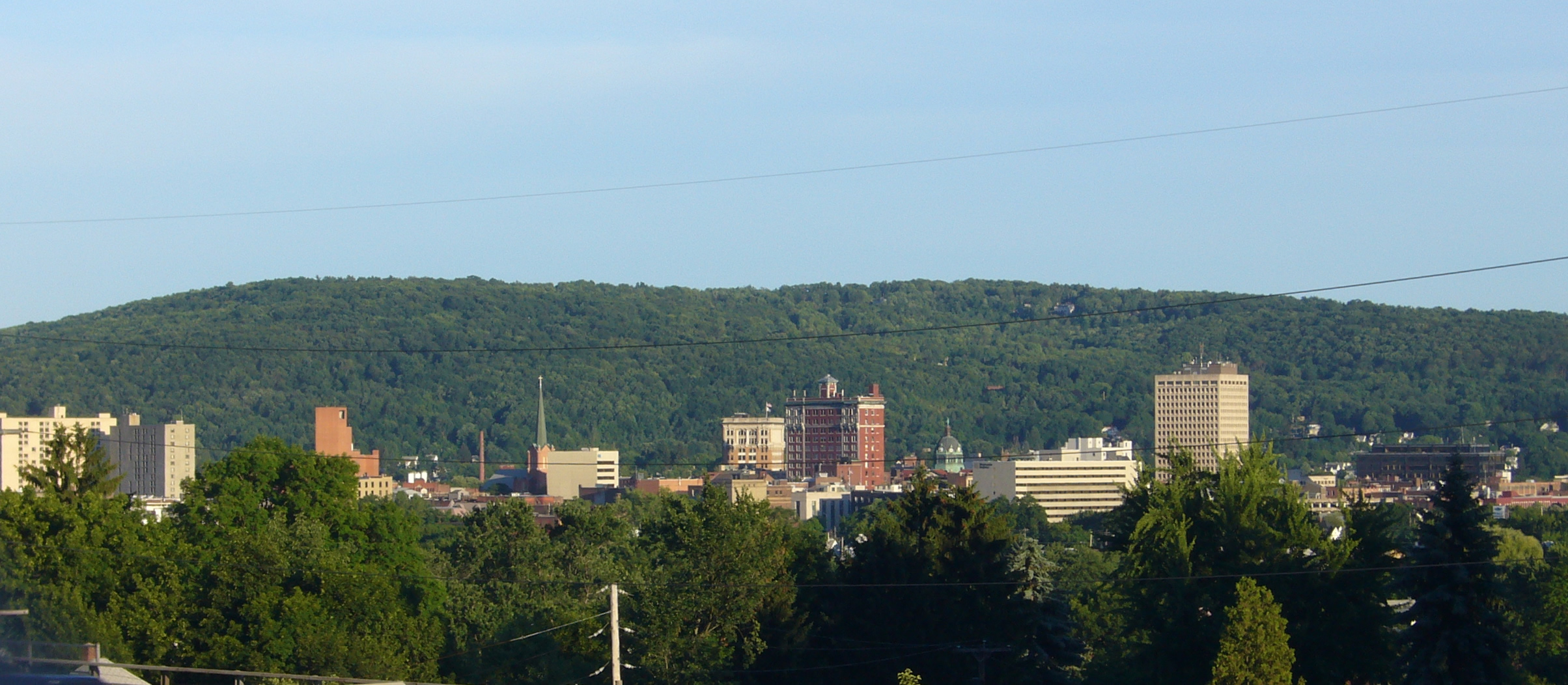
Binghamton, the fourteenth largest.

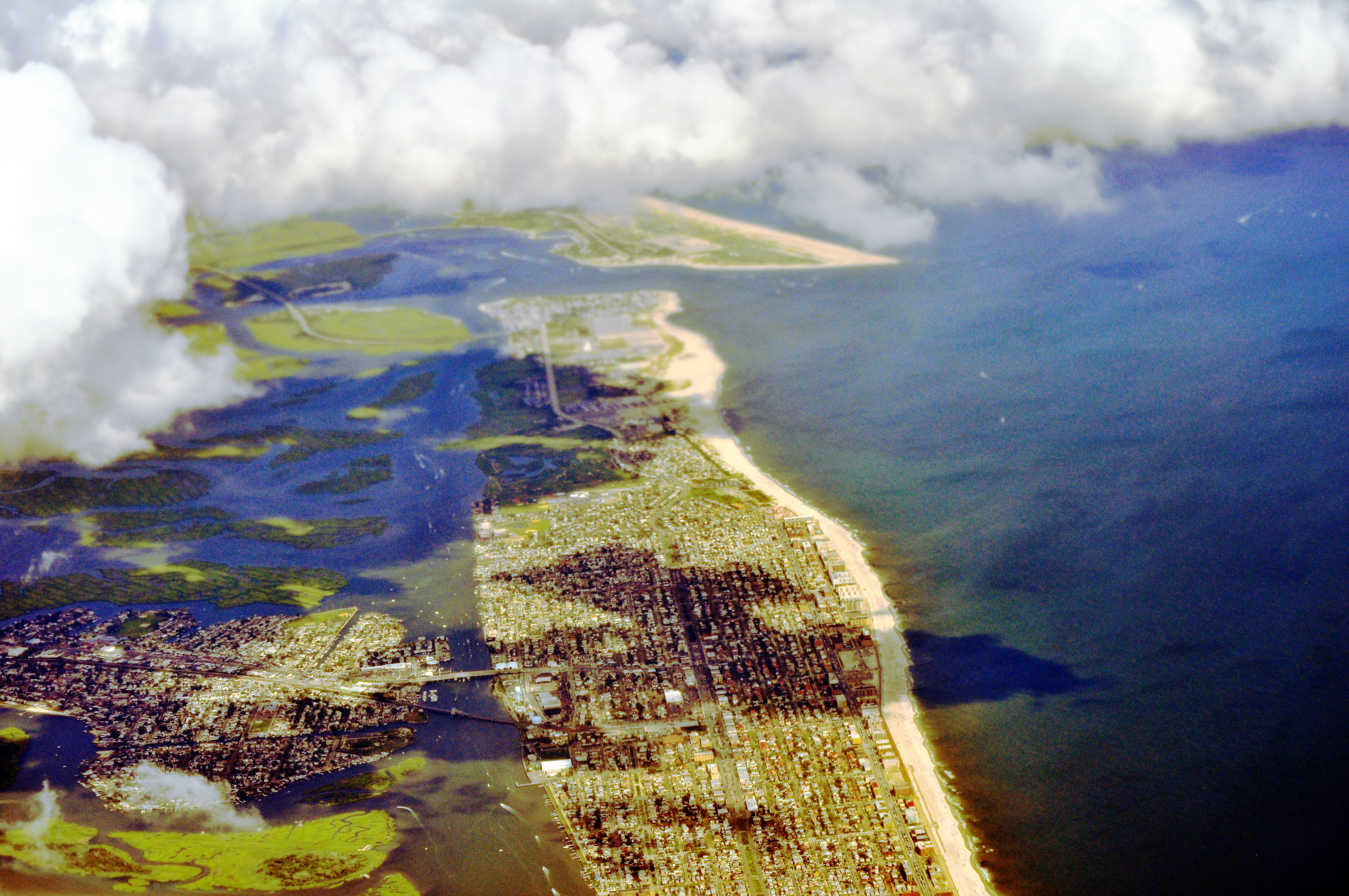
Long Beach, the sixteenth largest.

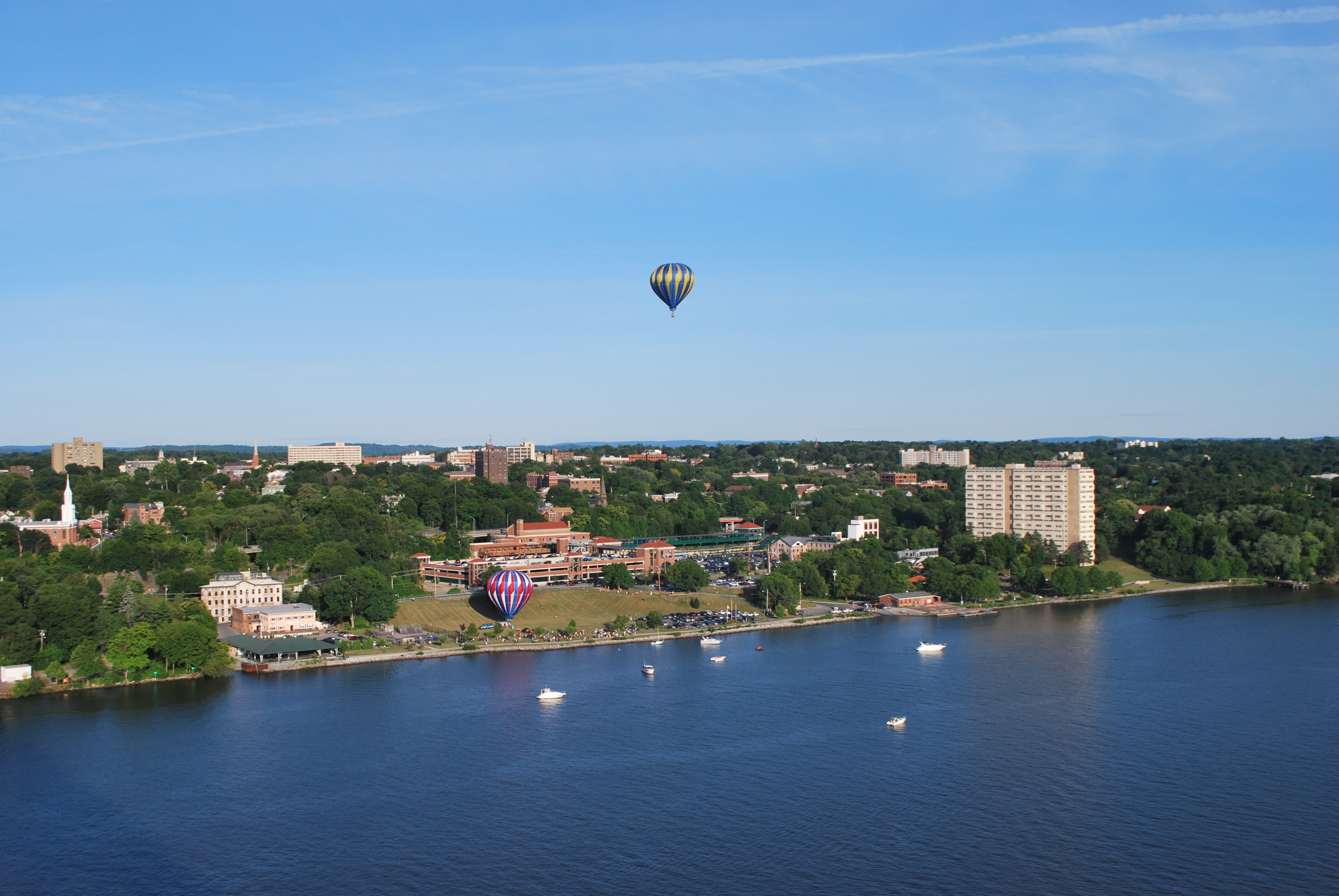
Poughkeepsie, the seventeenth largest.

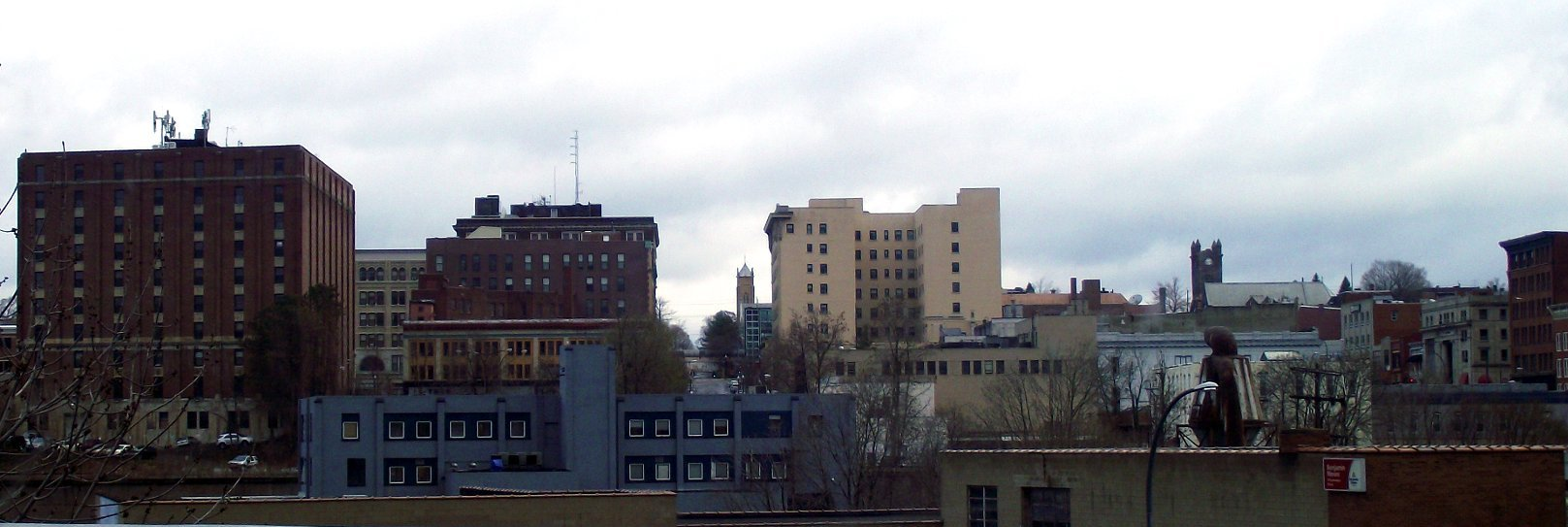
Jamestown, the nineteenth largest.

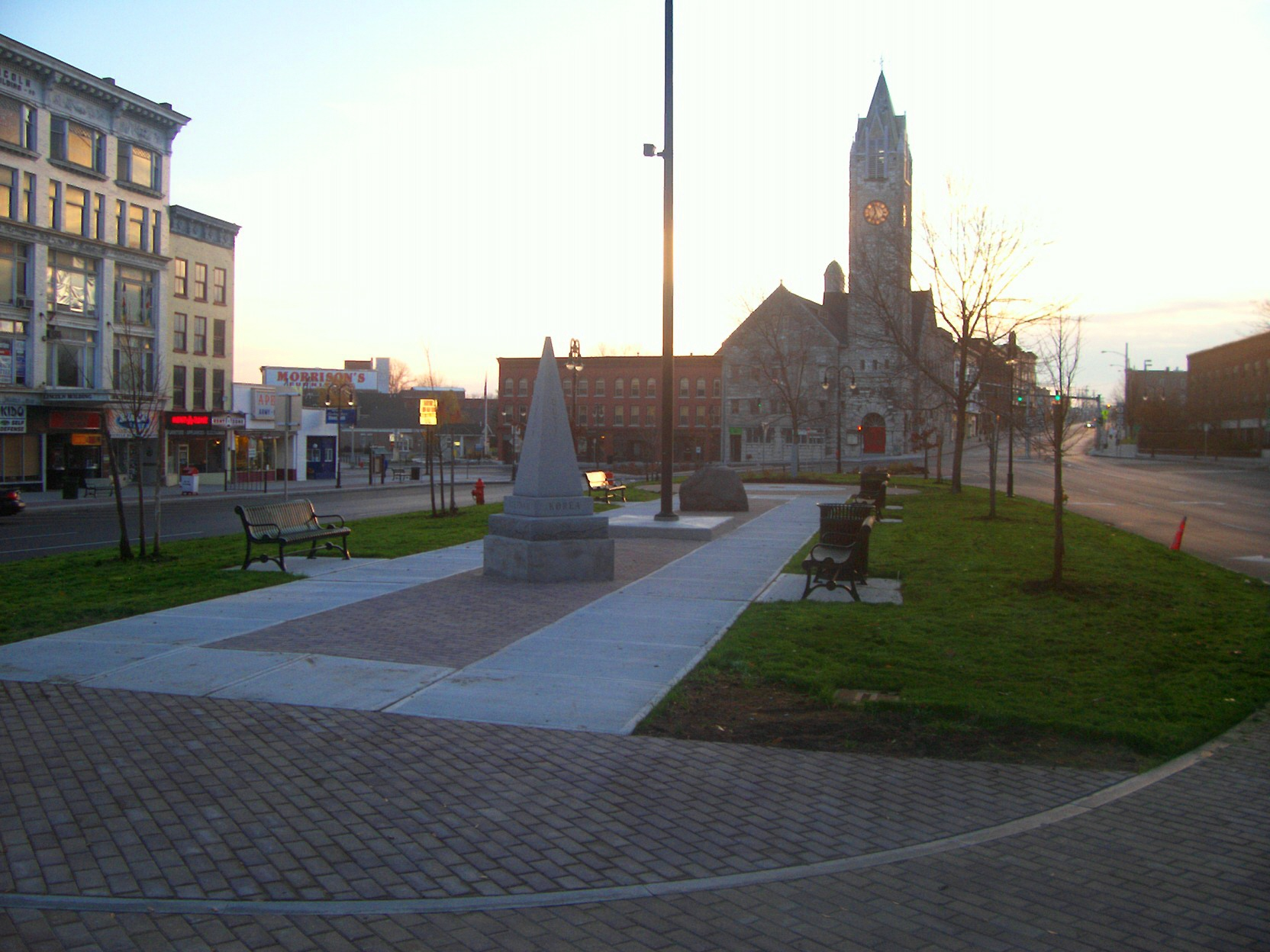
Watertown, the twenty-fifth largest.

== See also ==
- List of city nicknames in New York
- Administrative divisions of New York
- List of counties in New York
- List of towns in New York
- List of census-designated places in New York
- List of American Indian Reservations in New York (state)
