= White Lake (Oneida County, New York) =

- Location within New York White Lake (the United States)
- Location: Oneida County, New York, United States
- Coordinates: 43°32′42″N 75°09′04″W
- Type: Lake
- Primary outflows: White Lake Outlet
- Basin countries: United States
- Surface area: 244 acres (0.99 km^{2})
- Max. depth: 75 feet (23 m)
- Surface elevation: 1,437 feet (438 m)
- Islands: 6
- Settlements: Holiday House

White Lake is located south of Holiday House and north of Woodgate in Oneida County, New York. It drains via White Lake Outlet and ultimately its waters reach the Black River via Bear Creek and Woodhull Creek. Fish species present in the lake are brook trout, rainbow trout, largemouth and smallmouth bass, brown bullhead catfish, pike, bluegill, crappie, and yellow perch. The community of White Lake surrounds the lake.
