= Round Lake (Oneida County, New York) =

Lake in Oneida County, New York, United States

- Location within New York Location within the United States
- Location: Oneida County, New York
- Coordinates: 43°31′53″N 75°10′49″W
- Primary outflows: Long Lake Outlet
- Basin countries: United States
- Surface area: 53 acres (21 ha)
- Surface elevation: 1,404 feet (428 m)
- Settlements: Woodgate, New York, Holiday House, New York

Round Lake is a lake located northwest of Woodgate, New York, in Oneida County, New York.
