= Otter Lake (Oneida County, New York) =

Lake in Oneida County, New York, United States

- Location within New York Otter Lake (the United States)
- Location: Oneida County, New York, United States
- Coordinates: 43°35′31″N 75°07′04″W
- Primary outflows: Otter Lake Outlet
- Basin countries: United States
- Surface area: 148 acres (0.60 km^{2})
- Average depth: 5 feet (1.5 m)
- Max. depth: 9 feet (2.7 m)
- Shore length^{1}: 3.9 miles (6.3 km)
- Surface elevation: 1,519 feet (463 m)
- Islands: 3
- Settlements: Otter Lake, New York, McKeever, New York
- ^{1} Shore length is not a well-defined measure.

Otter Lake is located by Otter Lake, New York southeast of McKeever, New York. Fish species present in the lake are largemouth bass, white sucker, rock bass, yellow perch, smallmouth bass, and black bullhead. There is trail access from Long Lake on the southwest shore of Otter Lake.
