= Long Lake Outlet =

Location
- Country: United States
- State: New York

Physical characteristics
- Source: Long Lake
  - location: Holiday House, New York
  - coordinates: 43°32′50″N 75°09′34″W
  - elevation: 1,466 ft (447 m)
- Mouth: Cummings Creek
  - location: Hawkinsville, New York
  - coordinates: 43°30′17″N 75°14′25″W
  - elevation: 1,115 ft (340 m)

Basin features
- Tributaries
  - right: Round Lake

Long Lake Outlet drains Long Lake and flows into Cummings Creek east of Hawkinsville, New York.
