= List of city nicknames in New York State =

This partial list of city nicknames in New York compiles the aliases, sobriquets, and slogans that cities in the U.S. state of New York are known by (or have been known by historically), officially and unofficially, to municipal governments, local people, outsiders, or the cities' tourism boards or chambers of commerce. City nicknames can help in establishing a civic identity, helping outsiders recognize a community or attracting people to a community because of its nickname; promote civic pride; and build community unity. Nicknames and slogans that successfully create a new community "ideology or myth" are also believed to have economic value. Their economic value is difficult to measure, but there are anecdotal reports of cities that have achieved substantial economic benefits by "branding" themselves by adopting new slogans.

Some unofficial nicknames are positive, while others are derisive. The unofficial nicknames listed here have been in use for a long time or have gained wide currency.

== Nicknames by city ==
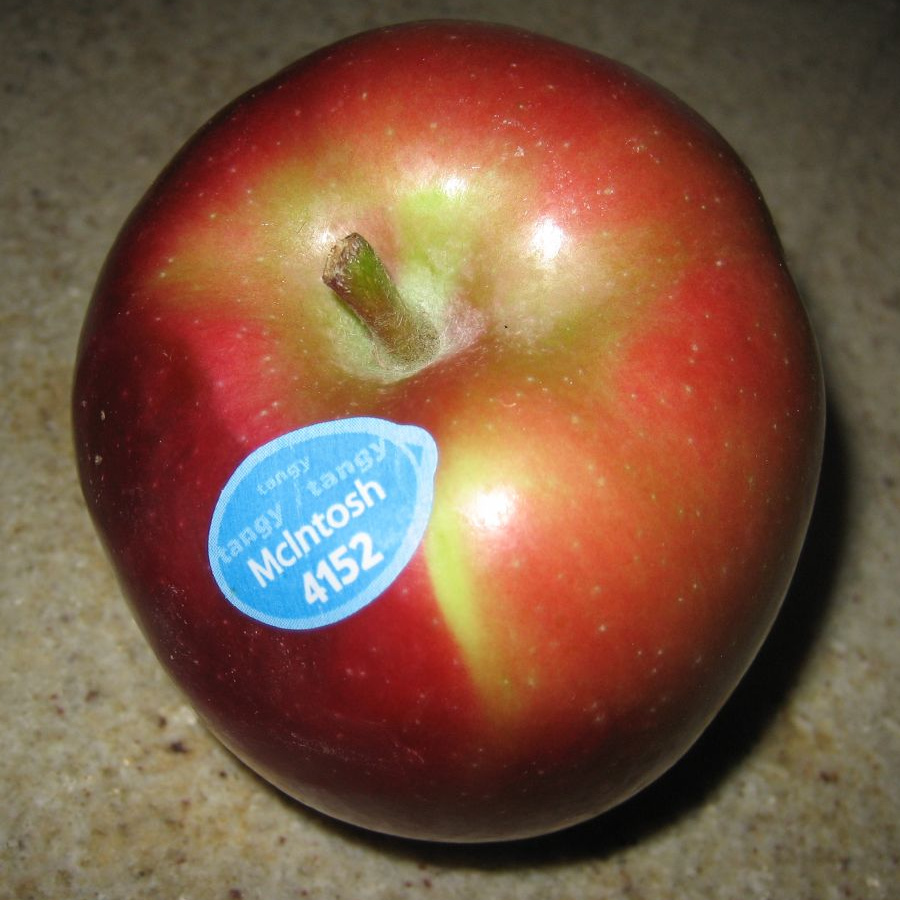
Chazy calls itself the world capital of the McIntosh apple.

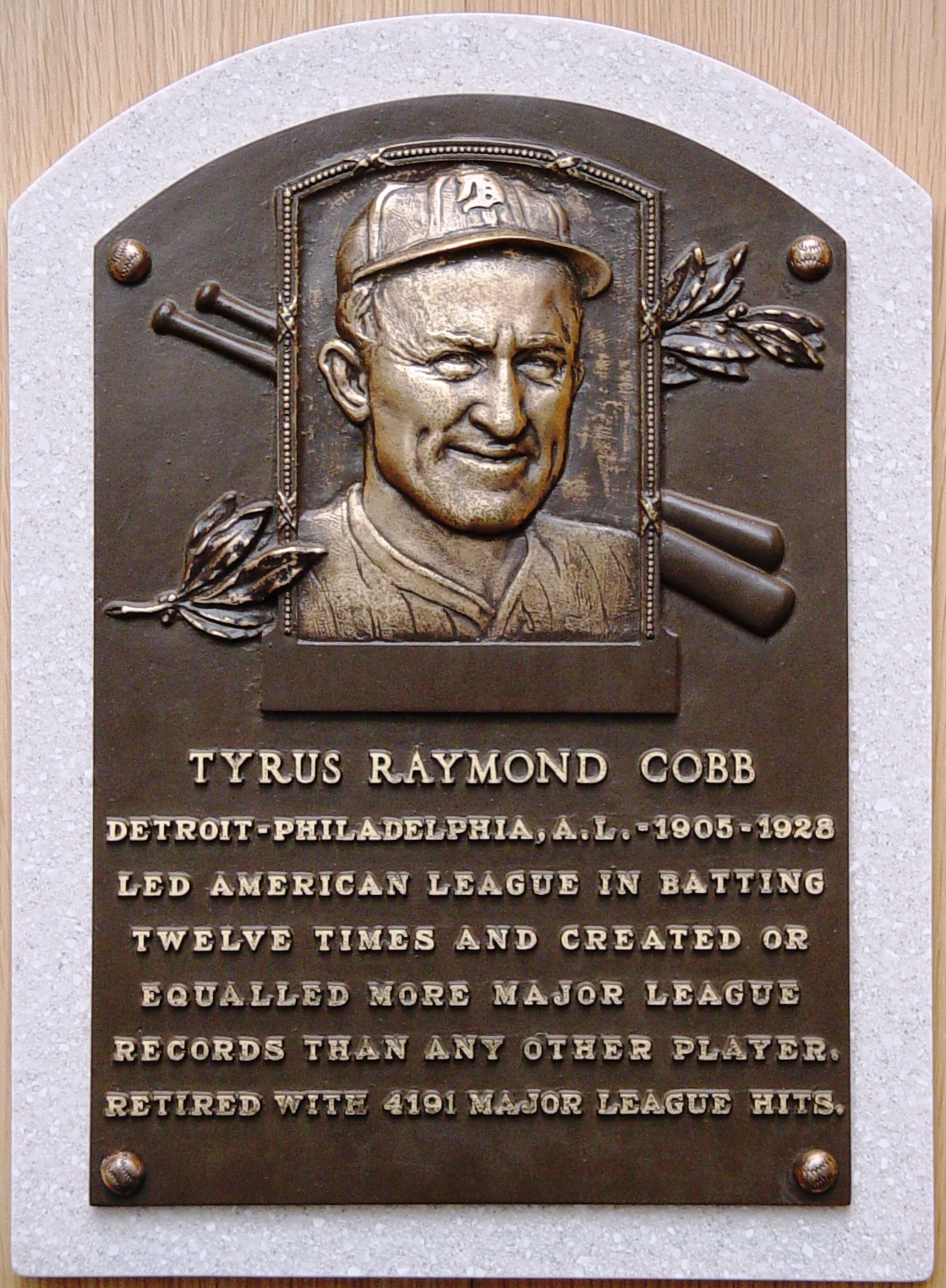
Cooperstown, site of the Baseball Hall of Fame where this plaque honoring Ty Cobb is displayed, lays claim to the title "Birthplace of Baseball."

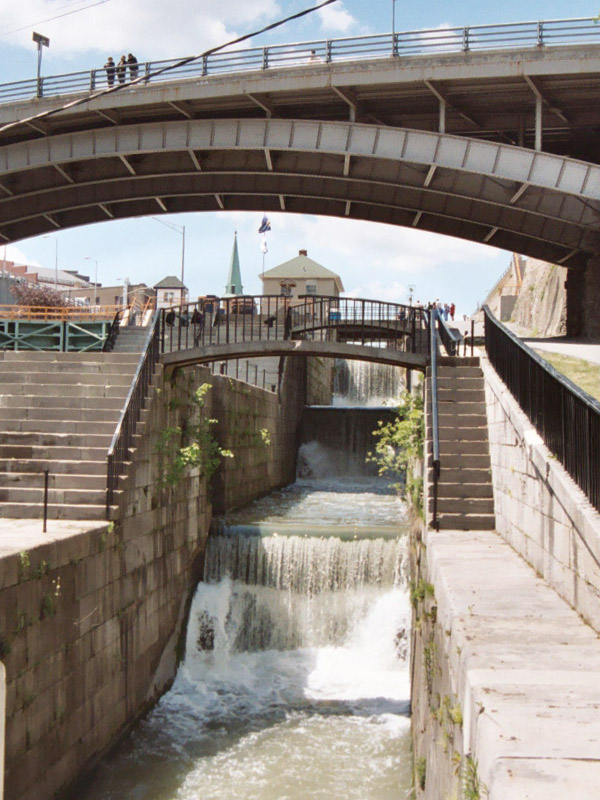
Lockport's nickname of "Lock City" refers to the several Erie Canal locks located in the city.

=== A ===
- Albany
  - Cradle of the Union
  - Nippertown
  - Smallbany (somewhat derisive)
- Amsterdam – The Carpet City
- Auburn
  - History's Hometown
  - The Prison City (for Auburn Correctional Facility, formerly Auburn Prison)

=== B ===
- Binghamton
  - Parlor City
  - Carousel Capital of the World
  - Valley of Opportunity
  - The Triple Cities (with Johnson City and Endicott)
  - Hockey Town USA
- The Bronx (part of New York City)
  - Boogie Down
  - The Birthplace of Hip-Hop
- Brooklyn (part of New York City)
  - The Borough of Homes and Churches (also "Borough of Churches" or "Borough of Homes")
  - The Borough of Trees
- Buffalo
  - The City of Good Neighbors
  - The City of Light (nickname at the time of the 1901 World's Fair)
  - The City of No Illusions
  - The Nickel City
  - The Queen City (or The Queen City of the Great Lakes)

=== C ===
- Canandaigua – The Chosen Spot
- Chazy – The World Capital of McIntosh Apples
- Cooperstown – Birthplace of Baseball
- Corinth – Snowshoe Capital of the World
- Corning – The Crystal City
- Cortland – The Crown City

=== E ===
- Elba – Onion Capital of the World
- Elmira – Soaring Capital of the World
- Endicott
  - The Magic City
  - The Triple Cities (with Binghamton and Johnson City)

=== F ===
- Florida – The Onion Capital of the World
- Fulton – City with a Future

=== G ===
- Geneva – Lake Trout Capital of the World
- Granville – Slate Capital of the World

=== H ===
- Hamburg – The Town That Friendship Built
- Hammondsport – Cradle of Aviation
- Haverstraw – Bricktown or Brickmaking Capital of the World
- Hornell – The Maple City
- Hurley – Sweet Corn Capital of the World

=== I ===
- Indian Lake-The Whitewater Rafting Capital
- Ithaca - City of Gorges, Ten Square Miles Surrounded by Reality

=== J ===
- Jamestown
  - The Furniture Capital of the World (1880s–1940s)
  - The Pearl City
- Johnson City
  - Home of the Square Deal
  - The Triple Cities (with Binghamton and Endicott)

=== K ===
- Kingston – Breadbasket of the Revolution

=== L ===
- Lockport – Lock City
- Long Beach – The City by the Sea

=== M ===
- Manhattan (borough of New York City) – The City
- Mechanicville – The Paper City
- Monsey – Ir Hakodesh ("the holy city" in Hebrew)
- Mount Vernon - “Money Earnin’”

=== N ===
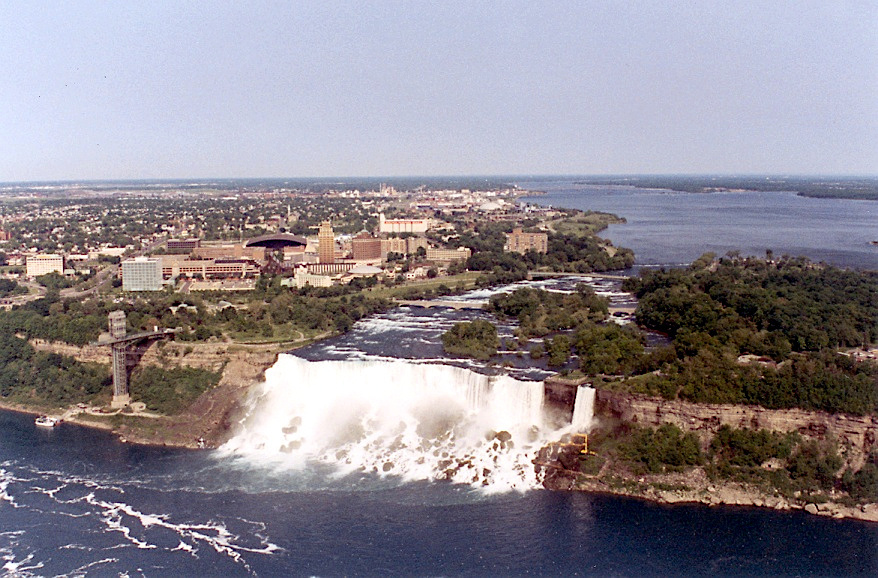
The city of Niagara Falls, New York, gets both its name and its nickname of "Cataract City" from the famous set of waterfalls known as Niagara Falls.

- New Rochelle
  - Queen City of the Sound
  - The City of Huguenots
  - The City of Parks
- New York City
  - The Big Apple
  - The Capital of the World
  - The City of Dreams
  - The City So Nice, They Named It Twice
  - The City That Never Sleeps
  - Empire City
  - The Five Boroughs
  - Fun City
  - Gotham
- Niagara Falls – Cataract City, historically associated with Niagara Falls, New York. The expression appears in 19th century newspapers referring to local institutions such as the Cataract House hotel and the Niagara Falls Cataract newspaper. In 2026, the new Cataract Stairs were renamed after Cataract City. Modern usage is also documented by Canadian author Craig Davidson, who stated about the title of his 2013 novel Cataract City: "Cataract City is the nickname of Niagara Falls, so I just stole that".
- North Tonawanda – Lumber City

=== O ===
- Ogdensburg
  - The Maple City (19th century)
  - The New York of the North (mid-19th century)

=== P ===
- Palmyra – Queen of Canal Towns
- Pearl River – The Town of Friendly People
- Phelps – Sauerkraut Capital
- Pine Island – Onion Capital of the World
- Plattsburgh – Ville Sur Le Lac (French) or The Lake City (English)
- Poughkeepsie
  - Queen City of the Hudson

=== Q ===
- Queens—The World's Borough

=== R ===
- Rhinebeck – Anemone Capital of the World
- Rochester
  - Crapchester
  - The Flour City (historical)
  - The Flower City (contemporary)
  - Ra-Cha-Cha
  - The Roc
  - Roc City
  - Snapshot City
  - Young Lion of the West
  - The World's Image Centre (1990's)
- Rome – Copper City
- Roscoe – Trout Town USA

=== S ===
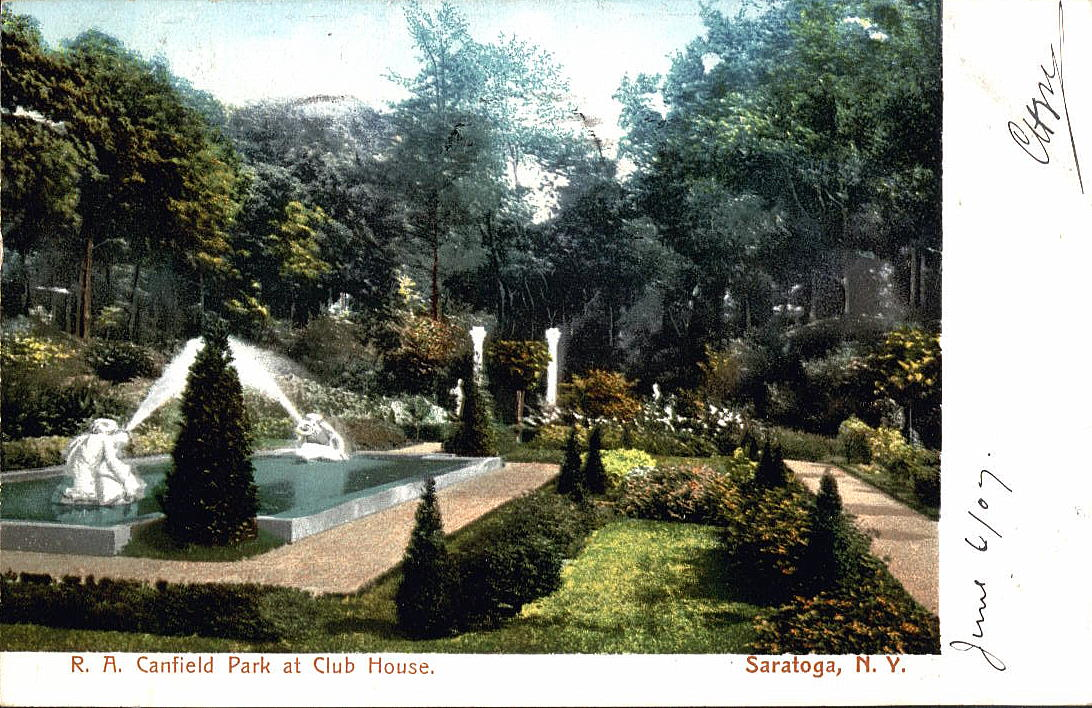
This 1907 postcard of Canfield Park and Saratoga Springs' nickname "the Spa City" both recall the era when the city's mineral springs and hotels made it a fashionable resort.

- Saratoga Springs
  - The Racing City
  - The Spa City
  - Toga
- Schenectady
  - Electric City
  - The City That Lights and Hauls the World
- Staten Island (borough of New York City)
  - The Borough of Parks
  - The Forgotten Borough
  - Shaolin
- Syracuse – Salt City

=== T ===
- Troy
  - The Collar City
  - The Troylet
  - Troyalty

=== U ===
- Utica
  - The City That God Forgot
  - Handshake City
  - Sin City
  - Cord Blood City

=== W ===
- Watertown – The Garland City
- Westfield – Grape Juice Capital of the World

=== Y ===
- Yonkers
  - The Lost Borough
  - City of Seven Hills
  - City of Gracious Living
  - The Terrace City

== See also ==
- List of city nicknames in the United States
- List of cities in New York (state)
- List of places in New York (state)
- List of towns in New York (state)
- List of villages in New York (state)
