= List of places in New York (state) =

The following is a series of lists sorted alphabetically of current cities, towns, unincorporated communities, counties, and other recognized places in the U.S. state of New York. They also include information on the number and names of counties in which the places lie and their lower and upper ZIP code bounds, if applicable. Click a letter to find places in New York starting with that letter. For the links to individual pages of places (counties, towns, cities, villages, and census-designated places), please see the Administrative divisions of New York at the bottom.

List of places in New York: A | B | C | D | E | F | G | H | I | J | K | L | M | N | O | P | Q | R | S | T | U | V | W | X | Y | Z

== See also ==
- List of city nicknames in New York
