= Forestport (hamlet), New York =

Forestport, New York
- Hamlet
- Location within New York Location within the United States
- Coordinates: 43°26′31″N 75°12′26″W
- Country: United States
- State: New York
- County: Oneida
- Town: Forestport
- Elevation: 341 ft (104 m)
- Time zone: UTC-5 (Eastern (EST))
  - Summer (DST): UTC-4 (EDT)
- ZIP code: 13338
- Area code: 315

Forestport is a hamlet located on NY 28 in the Town of Forestport in Oneida County, New York. It is located about 25 miles (40 km) north of Utica, New York. The Forestport Reservoir is located here and was created by the impoundment of the Black River, which flows north through the hamlet.
