= White Lake, Oneida County, New York =

White Lake, New York
- Census-designated place
- Location within New York Location within the United States
- Coordinates: 43°32′9″N 75°8′42″W
- Country: United States
- State: New York
- County: Oneida
- Town: Forestport

Area
  - Total: 2.43 sq mi (6.30 km^{2})
  - Land: 2.05 sq mi (5.31 km^{2})
  - Water: 0.38 sq mi (0.99 km^{2})
- Elevation: 1,430 ft (436 m)

Population (2020)
  - Total: 121
  - Density: 59.0/sq mi (22.78/km^{2})
- Time zone: UTC-5 (Eastern (EST))
  - Summer (DST): UTC-4 (EDT)
- ZIP Codes: 13494 (Woodgate); 13338 (Forestport)
- Area codes: 315/680
- FIPS code: 36-81644
- GNIS feature ID: 2806955

White Lake is a census-designated place (CDP) in the town of Forestport, Oneida County, New York, United States. It was first listed as a CDP prior to the 2020 census.

The CDP is in northeastern Oneida County, at the southwestern edge of the Adirondacks. It is in the northern part of the town of Forestport and surrounds White Lake, the outlet of which flows south through Bear Creek and Woodhull Creek to the Black River at Woodhull. The White Lake CDP includes part of the hamlet of Woodgate.

New York State Route 28 runs through the community, leading southwest 10 miles (16 km) to State Route 12 at Alder Creek and northeast 16 miles (26 km) to Old Forge. Via NY 12, Utica is 34 miles (55 km) south of White Lake.

== Demographics ==
Historical population
Census	Pop.	Note	%±
2020	121		—
U.S. Decennial Census

== Education ==
It is in the Town of Webb Union Free School District.
