= Forestport Tower =

Demolished tower in New York, US

- Interactive map of the Forestport Tower area

General information
- Status: Destroyed
- Type: Mast radiator insulated against ground
- Location: Forestport, New York, United States
- Coordinates: 43°26′41.14587″N 75°05′10.15″W
- Completed: 1950
- Destroyed: April 21, 1998

Height
- Height: 371.25 m (1,218.01 ft)

Design and construction
- Main contractor: US military

Forestport Tower was a guyed, steel tower, insulated from the earth, so that the entire structure was used to radiate electromagnetic waves in the VLF (Very Low Frequency; 3 kHz to 30 kHz) and LF (Low Frequency; 30 kHz to 300 kHz) bands. The tower, known locally as “the stick” or “the Forestport stick”, was located near Forestport in Oneida County, New York, United States. Forestport Tower was built in 1950. It had a height of 1218 ft (371.25 metres). Forestport Tower was used for experimental transmissions in the LF and VLF-range; some of these included the first tests of the LORAN-C and Omega Navigation System. On April 21, 1998 it was demolished by explosives.
