= Cummings Creek (Black River tributary) =

Location
- Country: United States
- State: New York

Physical characteristics
- Mouth: Black River
  - location: Hawkinsville, New York
  - coordinates: 43°29′56″N 75°16′30″W
  - elevation: 1,019 ft (311 m)
- Basin size: 22.9 mi^{2} (59 km^{2})

Basin features
- Tributaries
  - right: Long Lake Outlet, North Branch Cummings Creek

Cummings Creek flows into the Black River near Hawkinsville, New York.
