= Forestport Reservoir =

- Location within New York Location within the United States
- Location: Oneida County, New York, United States
- Coordinates: 43°25′58.97″N 75°12′18.64″W
- Type: Reservoir
- Primary inflows: Black River
- Primary outflows: Black River
- Basin countries: United States
- Surface area: 101 acres (0.41 km^{2})
- Average depth: 6 feet (1.8 m)
- Max. depth: 25 feet (7.6 m)
- Shore length^{1}: 3.5 miles (5.6 km)
- Surface elevation: 1,125 feet (343 m)
- Islands: 3
- Settlements: Forestport, New York
- ^{1} Shore length is not a well-defined measure.

Forestport Reservoir is a reservoir located by Forestport, New York. The reservoir was created by the impoundment of the Black River. Fish species present in the reservoir are yellow perch, lake trout, pickerel, white sucker, rock bass, smallmouth bass, and brown bullhead. There is state owned beach launch off Route 28.
