= Meyers Hill (New York) =

Mountain in New York, United States

- Location within New York Location within the United States

Highest point
- Elevation: 1,759 feet (536 m)
- Coordinates: 43°28′39″N 75°06′02″W

Geography
- Location: NE of Woodhull, New York, U.S.
- Topo map: USGS North Wilmurt

Meyers Hill is a summit located in Central New York Region of New York located in the Town of Forestport in Oneida County, northeast of Woodhull.
