= Long Lake (Oneida County, New York) =

- Location within New York Long Lake (the United States)
- Location: Oneida County, New York, United States
- Coordinates: 43°33′35″N 75°09′06″W
- Type: Lake
- Primary inflows: Otter Lake Outlet
- Primary outflows: Long Lake Outlet
- Basin countries: United States
- Surface area: 159 acres (0.64 km^{2})
- Average depth: 9 feet (2.7 m)
- Max. depth: 35 feet (11 m)
- Shore length^{1}: 5.6 miles (9.0 km)
- Surface elevation: 1,470 feet (450 m)
- Islands: 8
- Settlements: Holiday House, New York
- ^{1} Shore length is not a well-defined measure.

Long Lake is located northeast of Holiday House, New York. The lake is home to largemouth bass, crappie, rock bass, northern pike, yellow perch, smallmouth bass, walleye, white perch, and black bullhead. There is a state-owned carry down launch located on the northwest shore off Long Lake Road.

== Locations and tributaries ==
- Brandy Lake – A small 14 acre lake located west of Long Lake. Brandy Lake empties into Long Lake. Fish species in Brandy Lake include brook trout, and bullhead. Trail access off Round Lake Road on the west shore.
