= Meyers Hill (Oregon) =

Coordinates: 42°26′43″N 122°36′57″W

Meyers Hill is a summit in the U.S. state of Oregon. The elevation is 2,244 feet (684 m).

Meyers Hill was named in 1875 after one August Meyer.
