= Otter Lake, New York =

- Hamlet and CDP
- Location within New York Location within the United States
- Coordinates: 43°35′28″N 75°06′43″W
- Country: United States
- State: New York
- County: Oneida
- Town: Forestport

Area
  - Total: 0.70 sq mi (1.82 km^{2})
  - Land: 0.47 sq mi (1.22 km^{2})
  - Water: 0.23 sq mi (0.60 km^{2})
- Elevation: 1,545 ft (471 m)
- Time zone: UTC-5 (Eastern (EST))
  - Summer (DST): UTC-4 (EDT)
- ZIP Code: 13338 (Forestport)
- Area code: 315

Otter Lake is a hamlet (and census designated place) located on NY 28 in the Town of Forestport in Oneida County, New York, United States. It is located by Otter Lake. As of the 2020 census, Otter Lake had a population of 109.

== Education ==
It is in the Town of Webb Union Free School District.
