= Woodgate, New York =

- Hamlet
- Location within New York Location within the United States
- Coordinates: 43°31′13″N 75°09′18″W
- Country: United States
- State: New York
- County: Oneida
- Town: Forestport
- Elevation: 1,480 ft (450 m)
- Time zone: UTC-5 (Eastern (EST))
  - Summer (DST): UTC-4 (EDT)
- ZIP code: 13494
- Area codes: 315 & 680
- GNIS feature ID: 971631

Woodgate is a hamlet in Oneida County, New York, United States. The community is located along New York State Route 28, 9.5 miles (15.3 km) east-northeast of Boonville. Woodgate has a post office with ZIP code 13494, which opened on December 19, 1878.
