= Forestport, New York =

- Town
- Location in Oneida County and the state of New York.
- Coordinates: 43°28′22″N 75°10′4″W
- Country: United States
- State: New York
- County: Oneida

Government
  - Type: Town Council
  - Town Supervisor: Harold Entwistle (R)
  - Town Council: Members' List: • William Rockhill (R); • Mary Ann Rubyor (D); • Robert Seager (Ind.); • William Karn (R)

Area
  - Total: 78.90 sq mi (204.35 km^{2})
  - Land: 76.89 sq mi (199.15 km^{2})
  - Water: 2.01 sq mi (5.20 km^{2})
- Elevation: 1,424 ft (434 m)

Population (2020)
  - Total: 1,477
- Time zone: UTC-5 (Eastern (EST))
  - Summer (DST): UTC-4 (EDT)
- ZIP Codes: 13338 (Forestport); 13494 (Woodgate); 13309 (Boonville); 13433 (Port Leyden); 13301 (Alder Creek); 13438 (Remsen)
- Area code: 315
- FIPS code: 36-26627
- GNIS feature ID: 0978964
- Website: townofforestport.gov

Forestport is a town in Oneida County, New York, United States. The population was 1,477 at the 2020 census.

The Town of Forestport is located in the northeastern corner of Oneida County. The northern part of the town is in the Adirondack Park.

== History ==
Forestport was created from the Town of Remsen in 1869.

At the end of the 19th century, many of the town's population were found to be involved in a conspiracy to divert funds set aside for canal repair for the Black River Canal. Sections of the Black River Canal were pick axed so as to profit from repair work, infamously known as the "Forestport Breaks".

== Geography ==
According to the United States Census Bureau, the town has a total area of 79.0 square miles (205 km^{2}), of which 77.2 square miles (200 km^{2}) is land and 1.8 square miles (4.7 km^{2}) (2.25%) is water.

The eastern town line is the border of Herkimer County, and the northern town boundary is the border of Lewis County. The Black River and Kayuta Lake define the western town line.

== Demographics ==
Historical population
Census	Pop.	Note	%±
1870	1,275		—
1880	1,358		6.5%
1890	1,519		11.9%
1900	1,562		2.8%
1910	1,100		−29.6%
1920	862		−21.6%
1930	796		−7.7%
1940	730		−8.3%
1950	723		−1.0%
1960	821		13.6%
1970	1,173		42.9%
1980	1,380		17.6%
1990	1,556		12.8%
2000	1,692		8.7%
2010	1,535		−9.3%
2020	1,477		−3.8%
U.S. Decennial Census

At the 2000 census, there were 1,692 people, 736 households and 479 families residing in the town. The population density was 21.9 inhabitants per square mile (8.5/km^{2}). There were 2,027 housing units at an average density of 26.3 per square mile (10.2/km^{2}). The racial makeup of the town was 98.52% White, 0.35% African American, 0.30% Native American, 0.18% Asian, 0.06% from other races, and 0.59% from two or more races. Hispanic or Latino of any race were 0.06% of the population.

There were 736 households, of which 25.7% had children under the age of 18 living with them, 53.9% were married couples living together, 7.3% had a female householder with no husband present, and 34.8% were non-families. 30.7% of all households were made up of individuals, and 12.9% had someone living alone who was 65 years of age or older. The average household size was 2.30 and the average family size was 2.84.

22.5% of the population were under the age of 18, 4.6% from 18 to 24, 25.2% from 25 to 44, 30.2% from 45 to 64, and 17.6% who were 65 years of age or older. The median age was 43 years. For every 100 females, there were 103.4 males. For every 100 females age 18 and over, there were 103.7 males.

The median household income was $34,455 and the median family income was $39,352. Males had a median income of $30,119 compared with $25,060 for females. The per capita income for the town was $18,494. About 7.1% of families and 8.9% of the population were below the poverty line, including 11.4% of those under age 18 and 9.8% of those age 65 or over.

== Communities and locations in Forestport ==
- Anos Siding – a location in the northeastern part of the town.
- Forestport - the hamlet of Forestport is located on the banks of the Black River off NY 28 in the southwestern part of the town.
- Forestport Reservoir – A reservoir located by the hamlet of Forestport.
- Forestport Station – a hamlet east of Forestport.
- Holiday House – a location on NY 28 north of Woodgate.
- Long Lake – a lake in the northeastern part of the town north of Woodgate.
- Meyers Hill – An elevation located northeast of Woodhull.
- Nichols Mills – a location in the northeastern part of the town.
- Otter Lake – a hamlet located on NY 28 in the northeastern corner of the town.
- Otter Lake – a lake located in the northeastern corner of the town by the hamlet of Otter Lake.
- Round Lake – A lake located southeast of Long Lake.
- White Lake – a lake and hamlet south of Long Lake and adjacent to Route 28.
- Woodgate - located seven miles north of the hamlet of Forestport on SR 28.
- Woodhull – a hamlet southwest of Forestport.

== See also ==
- Forestport Tower
