= New York State Route 283 =

State highway in Jefferson County, New York, US

New York State Route 283
- Map of Jefferson and Lewis counties with NY 283 highlighted in red and NY 971V in blue

Route information
- Maintained by NYSDOT and the city of Watertown
- Length: 5.79 mi (9.32 km)
- Existed: 1980s–present

Major junctions
- West end: US 11 / NY 3 / NY 12 in Watertown
- East end: NY 342 in Le Ray

Location
- Country: United States
- State: New York
- Counties: Jefferson

Highway system
- New York Highways; Interstate; US; State; Reference; Parkways
← NY 282	→ NY 284

New York State Route 283 (NY 283) is an east–west state highway in Jefferson County, New York, in the United States. It extends for 5.79 miles (9.32 km) as a two-lane road from an intersection with U.S. Route 11 (US 11), NY 3, and NY 12 in downtown Watertown to a junction with NY 342 in the town of Le Ray. The route passes through mostly rural areas, with the exception of a dense commercial district around the highway's west end. NY 283 is one of three routes directly connecting Watertown's Public Square to Fort Drum; the others are US 11 and NY 3, which loosely parallel NY 283 between the two locations.

The portion of the route outside of the Watertown city limits was originally maintained by Jefferson County as part of County Route 52 (CR 52), a highway extending from Watertown to Felts Mills. CR 52 became a state highway in 1979 and was designated as part of NY 283 in the 1980s, with the route continuing west over locally maintained streets to serve downtown Watertown. The portion of the route within Fort Drum was given to the post by the early 1990s, at which time NY 283 was truncated to its current length.

== Route description ==
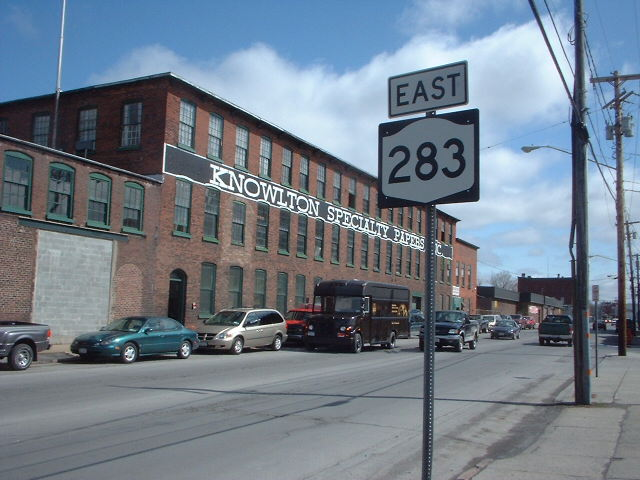
NY 283 eastbound in Watertown

NY 283 begins in downtown Watertown, where it meets US 11, NY 3, and NY 12 at the city's Public Square. The two-lane route departs US 11 and NY 12 at a 45-degree angle and maintains a northeasterly routing through a commercialized part of the city as Factory Street. It parallels the southern bank of the Black River to the eastern edge of the downtown district, where the highway crosses the waterway by way of Sewalls Island and becomes known as Pearl Street. On the opposite riverbank, NY 283 serves another brief stretch of businesses before leaving the city limits and entering the town of Pamelia. Here, the line of commercial properties gives way to open, rolling fields as the route heads northeastward across the southern part of the town. The highway serves little more than a handful of isolated homes and businesses before curving slightly northward at the Pamelia–Le Ray town line.

Across the town line in Le Ray, NY 283 continues to run across largely undeveloped rolling terrain, passing a small number of scattered residences. Most of these lie on the outskirts of the small hamlet of Calcium, located 1 mile (1.6 km) to the northwest of NY 283 on US 11, which loosely parallels the former through Pamelia and Le Ray. NY 283 remains on a northeasterly track to the vicinity of Fort Drum, where the route bends eastward ahead of a rural junction with NY 342 at the western edge of the military reservation. NY 283 terminates here while Pearl Street continues into the post as a four-lane divided highway named Pearl Street Road.

== History ==
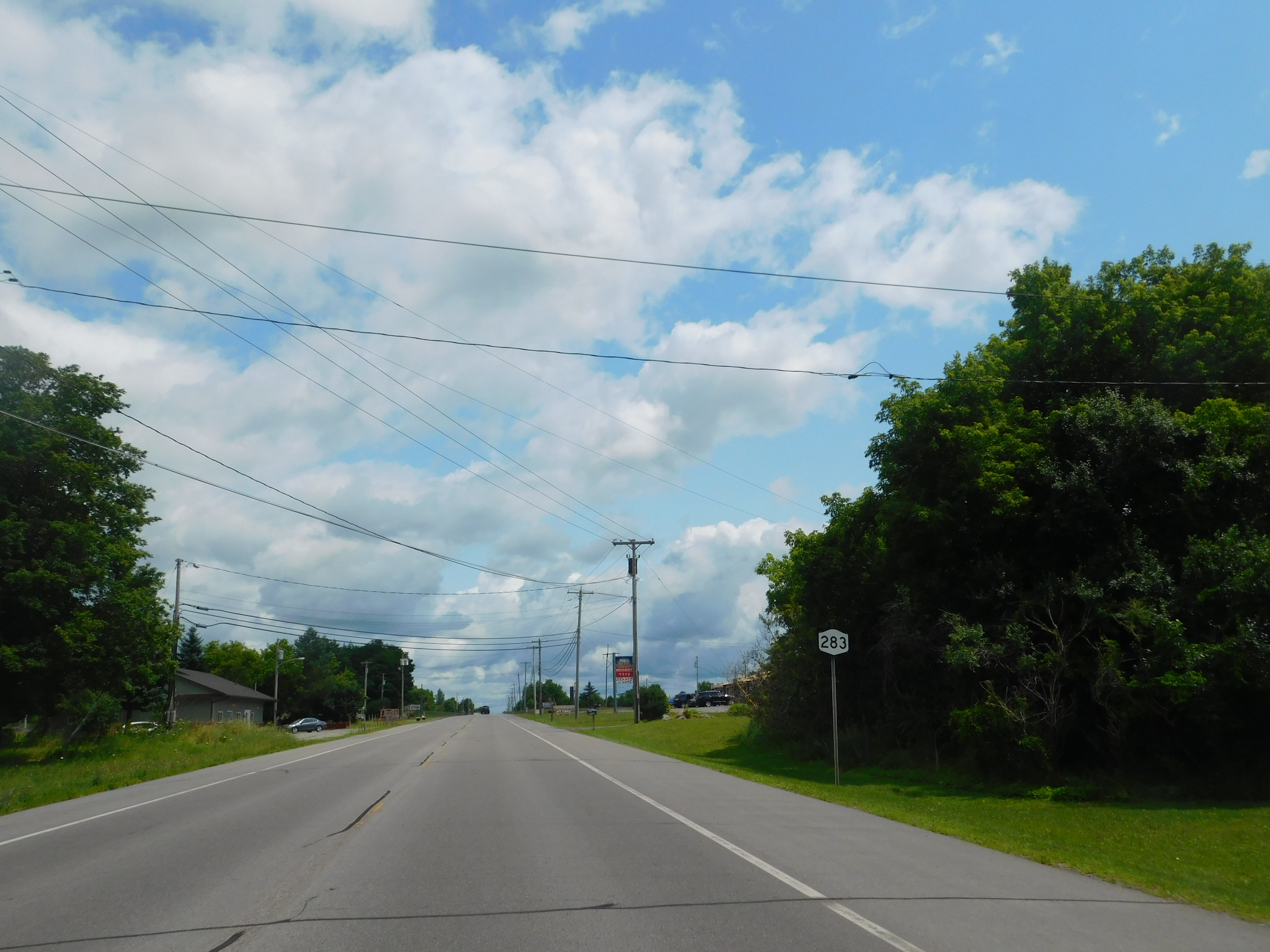
NY 283 eastbound in Le Ray

The part of Pearl Street outside the Watertown city limits was originally maintained by Jefferson County as part of CR 52, which continued east from NY 342 on Pearl Street Road and Gray Street to an intersection with NY 3 in the hamlet of Felts Mills. On August 1, 1979, ownership and maintenance of CR 52 was transferred from the county to the state of New York as part of a highway maintenance swap between the two levels of government. The new state highway was designated NY 283 in the 1980s. The designation also continued west into Watertown along city-maintained portions of Pearl and Factory streets to Mill Street. By 1993, maintenance of Pearl Street within Fort Drum was turned over to the military reservation. NY 283 was truncated to end at NY 342 at the western limits of the post while the piece of Pearl Street between the Fort Drum limits and Felts Mills was redesignated as NY 971V, an unsigned reference route 0.87 miles (1.40 km) in length.

== Major intersections ==
The entire route is in Jefferson County.

Location	mi	km	Destinations	Notes
Watertown	0.00	0.00	US 11 / NY 3 / NY 12	Western terminus
Le Ray	5.79	9.32	NY 342 / Pearl Street Road – Fort Drum, Calcium, Black River	Eastern terminus
1.000 mi = 1.609 km; 1.000 km = 0.621 mi

== See also ==
- List of county routes in Jefferson County, New York
