= Calcium, New York =

- Census-designated place
- Location within New York Location within the United States
- Coordinates: 44°2′5″N 75°50′32″W
- Country: United States
- State: New York
- County: Jefferson
- Town: Le Ray

Area
  - Total: 5.61 sq mi (14.53 km^{2})
  - Land: 5.61 sq mi (14.52 km^{2})
  - Water: 0 sq mi (0.00 km^{2})
- Elevation: 469 ft (143 m)

Population (2020)
  - Total: 3,573
  - Density: 637.2/sq mi (246.02/km^{2})
- Time zone: UTC-5 (Eastern (EST))
  - Summer (DST): UTC-4 (EDT)
- ZIP Codes: 13616 (Calcium); 13637 (Evans Mills)
- Area code: 315
- FIPS code: 36-11671
- GNIS feature ID: 0945447

Calcium is a census-designated place (CDP) in Jefferson County, New York, United States. The population was 3,573 as of the 2020 census. The CDP is in the town of Le Ray and includes the hamlets of Calcium and Sanfords Four Corners.

The town was renamed Calcium in 1911 at the request of local inventor Madison Cooper after the calcium chloride used in his patented refrigeration plants.

Historic landmarks include the stone house at the intersection of State Route 342 and County Route 138 that once served as the post office for the area, and the Calcium Community Church at the same intersection. The church was built in 1853 by a group of at least three different denominations, including Methodist Episcopal, Christian, and Unitarian. The building was shared by these and various Christian groups over the years, and remains a community church today.

== Geography ==
Calcium is located in central Jefferson County at 44°02′05″N 75°50′32″W, in the western part of the town of Le Ray. It is bordered on the east by the developed part of Fort Drum.

The hamlet of Calcium is in the southern part of the CDP, east of U.S. Route 11, while Sanfords Four Corners is in the central part of the CDP along New York State Route 342 east of US-11. Route 11 leads southwest 5 miles (8 km) into Watertown, the Jefferson county seat, and northeast 31 miles (50 km) to Gouverneur. Route 342 leads east along the south edge of Fort Drum 2.5 miles (4.0 km) to Black River and west 4.5 miles (7.2 km) to Interstate 81. Interstate 781 runs through the northern part of the Calcium CDP, connecting to the east with Iraqi Freedom Drive into Fort Drum and leading west 4 miles (6 km) to I-81.

According to the United States Census Bureau, Calcium CDP has a total area of 5.6 square miles (14.4 km^{2}), of which 1.0 acre (4,035 m^{2}), or 0.03%, are water.

== Demographics ==
Historical population
Census	Pop.	Note	%±
2000	3,346		—
2010	3,491		4.3%
2020	3,573		2.3%
U.S. Decennial Census

=== 2020 census ===
As of the 2020 census, Calcium had a population of 3,573. The median age was 25.7 years. 21.1% of residents were under the age of 18 and 4.1% of residents were 65 years of age or older. For every 100 females there were 113.8 males, and for every 100 females age 18 and over there were 112.2 males age 18 and over.

90.2% of residents lived in urban areas, while 9.8% lived in rural areas.

There were 1,639 households in Calcium, of which 32.3% had children under the age of 18 living in them. Of all households, 51.8% were married-couple households, 24.5% were households with a male householder and no spouse or partner present, and 18.0% were households with a female householder and no spouse or partner present. About 27.7% of all households were made up of individuals and 2.9% had someone living alone who was 65 years of age or older.

There were 1,877 housing units, of which 12.7% were vacant. The homeowner vacancy rate was 0.0% and the rental vacancy rate was 13.0%.

Racial composition as of the 2020 census
Race	Number	Percent
White	2,199	61.5%
Black or African American	550	15.4%
American Indian and Alaska Native	27	0.8%
Asian	150	4.2%
Native Hawaiian and Other Pacific Islander	9	0.3%
Some other race	282	7.9%
Two or more races	356	10.0%
Hispanic or Latino (of any race)	614	17.2%

=== 2000 census ===
As of the census of 2000, there were 3,346 people, 1,052 households, and 911 families residing in the community. The population density was 598.9 inhabitants per square mile (231.2/km^{2}). There were 1,134 housing units at an average density of 203.0 per square mile (78.4/km^{2}). The racial makeup of the CDP was 67.30% White, 19.52% African American, 1.23% Native American, 1.64% Asian, 0.36% Pacific Islander, 6.19% from other races, and 3.77% from two or more races. 12.61% of the population were Hispanic or Latino of any race.

There were 1,052 households, out of which 62.1% had children under the age of 18 living with them, 72.6% were married couples living together, 10.9% had a female householder with no husband present, and 13.4% were non-families. 10.1% of all households were made up of individuals, and 1.9% had someone living alone who was 65 years of age or older. The average household size was 3.18 and the average family size was 3.41.

In the community, the population was spread out, with 40.0% under the age of 18, 16.2% from 18 to 24, 34.1% from 25 to 44, 7.2% from 45 to 64, and 2.5% who were 65 years of age or older. The median age was 23 years. For every 100 females, there were 100.4 males. For every 100 females age 18 and over, there were 96.4 males.

The median income for a household in the village was $28,977, and the median income was $30,000. Males had a median income of $25,243 versus $16,250 for females. The per capita income for the CDP was $10,356. 15.4% of the population and 12.7% of families were below the poverty line. Out of the total population, 17.9% of those under the age of 18 and none of those 65 and older were living below the poverty line.

== Education ==
The school district for almost all of the area is the Indian River Central School District. Small portions extend into Watertown City School District.
