= 781 (disambiguation) =

781 may refer to:

- 781 Kartvelia, a minor planet orbiting the Sun
- 781 series, a Japanese train type
- 781st Bombardment Squadron, a former United States Air Force unit
- Area codes 781 and 339, in the USA
- BOAC Flight 781, a flight which crashed in 1954
- Interstate 781, a highway in the USA

== See also ==
- List of highways numbered 781
