= Pamelia Center, New York =

- Census-designated place
- Location within New York Location within the United States
- Coordinates: 44°02′24″N 75°54′03″W
- Country: United States
- State: New York
- County: Jefferson
- Town: Pamelia

Area
  - Total: 1.40 sq mi (3.62 km^{2})
  - Land: 1.40 sq mi (3.62 km^{2})
  - Water: 0 sq mi (0.00 km^{2})
- Elevation: 469 ft (143 m)

Population (2020)
  - Total: 471
  - Density: 336.6/sq mi (129.97/km^{2})
- Time zone: UTC-5 (Eastern (EST))
  - Summer (DST): UTC-4 (EDT)
- ZIP Code: 13601 (Watertown)
- Area codes: 315 & 680
- GNIS feature ID: 959803
- FIPS code: 36-56212

Pamelia Center is a hamlet and census-designated place (CDP) in Jefferson County, New York, United States. As of the 2020 census, Pamelia Center had a population of 471. The community is located at the junction of New York State Route 37 and New York State Route 342.

== Geography ==
Pamelia Center is in central Jefferson County in the town of Pamelia. Interstate 81 runs along the western edge of the community, with access from Exit 48 (NY 342), and Interstate 781 runs through the northern part, with access from I-81 only. I-81 leads south 5 miles (8 km) to Watertown, the county seat, and north 25 miles (40 km) to the Canada–United States border at the St. Lawrence River. I-781 leads east 5 miles (8 km) to Fort Drum.

According to the U.S. Census Bureau, the CDP has an area of 1.041 square miles (2.70 km^{2}), all land.

== Demographics ==
Historical population
Census	Pop.	Note	%±
2020	471		—
U.S. Decennial Census

== Education ==
The school district is General Brown Central School District.
