= Sanfords Four Corners, New York =

- Hamlet
- Location within New York Location within the United States
- Coordinates: 44°01′52″N 75°50′06″W
- Country: United States
- State: New York
- County: Jefferson
- Town: Le Ray
- Elevation: 492 ft (150 m)
- Time zone: UTC-5 (Eastern (EST))
  - Summer (DST): UTC-4 (EDT)
- Area code: 315
- GNIS feature ID: 2096995

Sanfords Four Corners (also Sanford's Corners) is a hamlet in Jefferson County, New York, United States. The hamlet is in the town of Le Ray and is part of the Calcium census-designated place.

== Notable person ==
- Louis L. Jabas, Wisconsin State Assemblyman and farmer, was born in Sanford's Corner.
