= Case Middle School =

Case Middle School may refer to:

- Case Middle School (Hawaii)
- Case Middle School (New York)
