= New York State Route 342 =

State highway in Jefferson County, New York, US

New York State Route 342
- Map of the Watertown area with NY 342 highlighted in red

Route information
- Maintained by NYSDOT
- Length: 8.37 mi (13.47 km)
- Existed: November 1963–present

Major junctions
- West end: NY 12 in Pamelia
- I-81 in Pamelia; US 11 in Le Ray
- East end: NY 3 in Le Ray

Location
- Country: United States
- State: New York
- Counties: Jefferson

Highway system
- New York Highways; Interstate; US; State; Reference; Parkways
| ← NY 341 | → NY 343 |

New York State Route 342 (NY 342) is a short east–west state highway in Jefferson County, New York, in the United States. The western terminus of NY 342 is at an intersection with NY 12 near the hamlet of Scoville Corners in the town of Pamelia. The eastern terminus is at a junction with NY 3 in the town of Le Ray, west of the village of Black River. Along the way, NY 342 connects to Interstate 81 (I-81) in Pamelia and intersects U.S. Route 11 (US 11) outside of the Le Ray hamlet of Calcium.

What is now NY 342 was originally built during the 1950s as a federal-aid highway known as the "Watertown Bypass". It became a state highway in 1960, at which time it was designated as New York State Route 181. The designation was short-lived as NY 181 was renumbered to NY 342 in November 1963. The portion of NY 342 between US 11 and NY 3 was part of NY 26 from the late 1950s to the mid-1970s.

== Route description ==
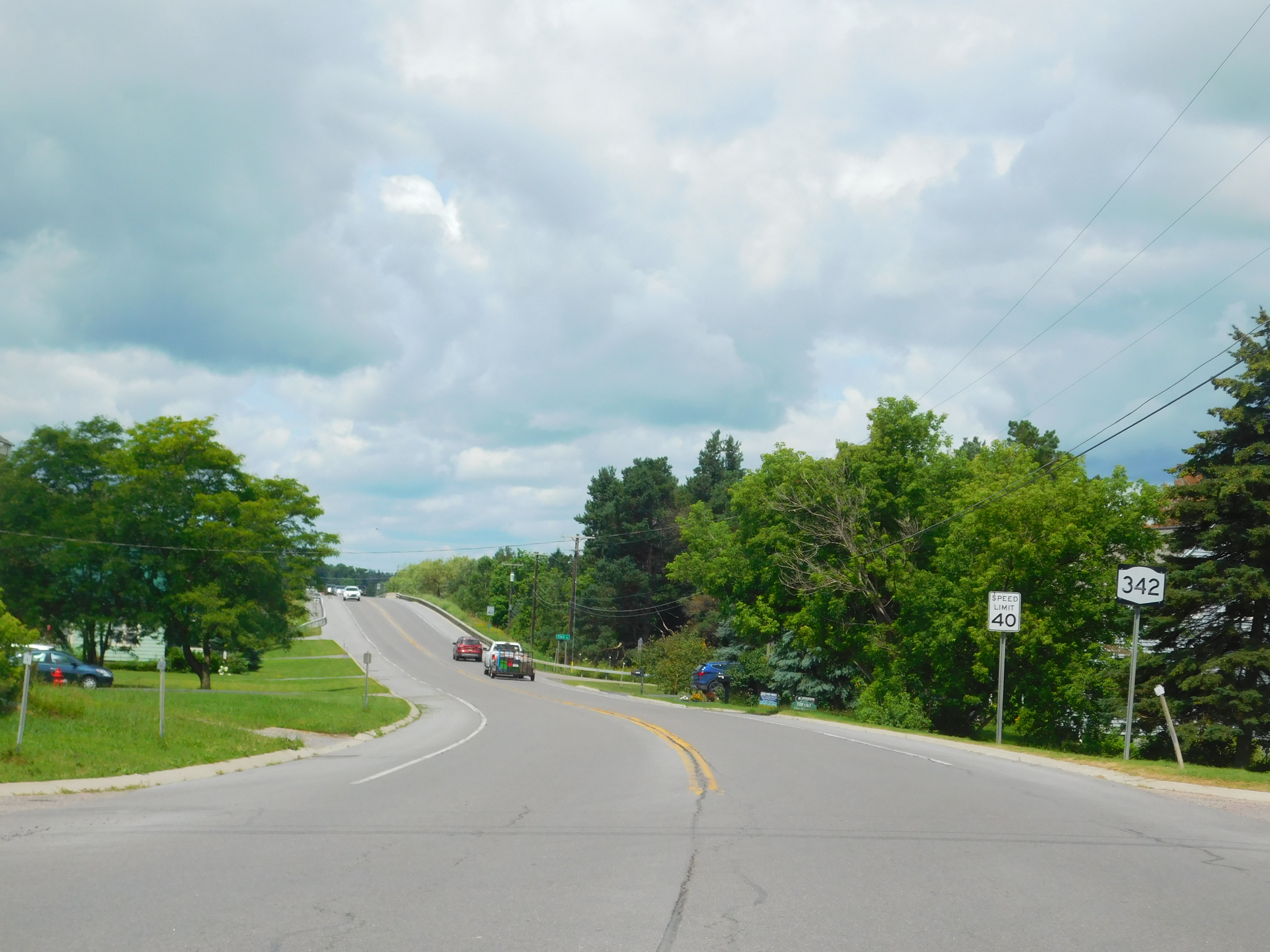
NY 342 westbound in Calcium

In the west, NY 342 begins at an intersection with NY 12 in Pamelia, a town to the north of the city of Watertown. It heads northeastward through open, mostly undeveloped fields for 1 mile (1.6 km) to an interchange with I-81. East of I-81, the development along NY 342 increases as the route enters Pamelia Center, a hamlet centered on NY 342's intersection with NY 37. NY 342 continues on, passing through the eastern portion of the community and serving a local country club before entering another rural area dominated by open fields.

Upon intersecting Nellis Road, NY 342 turns to follow a linear, southeasterly routing into the town of Le Ray. The rural surroundings remain until the hamlet of Calcium, where NY 342 meets US 11 north of the community's center in a lightly populated residential area just southwest of the Fort Drum Military Reservation. The route continues on, running along the southwestern edge of Fort Drum to a junction with NY 283. At this point, NY 342 curves to the south, bypassing the village of Black River to the west as it heads through another undeveloped area consisting of little more than open fields. The route ends roughly 1.5 miles (2.4 km) to the south of NY 283 at an intersection with NY 3 southwest of the village.

== History ==
The portion of modern NY 342 between NY 12 in Pamelia and US 11 in Le Ray was originally built in stages between 1951 and 1955 as a federal-aid highway named the "Watertown Bypass". The remainder of the route (via Le Ray and South Main Streets in Black River) was built around this time. NY 26 was realigned between 1956 and 1958 to use the portion of the bypass between US 11 and NY 3. The change was part of a larger realignment of NY 26 between Carthage and Antwerp.

In 1960, the New York State Department of Transportation assumed ownership and maintenance of the Watertown Bypass. The entirety of the new state highway, including the portion already part of NY 26, was initially designated as NY 181. It was renumbered to NY 342 in November 1963, eliminating potential confusion between NY 181 and the nearby I-81. All signage was changed on November 27, 1963, reflecting the change. NY 342 was also rerouted to bypass Black River to the west around this time. The overlap with NY 26 was eliminated in the mid-1970s when NY 26 was truncated to Carthage.

== Major intersections ==
The entire route is in Jefferson County.

| Location | mi | km | Destinations | Notes |
|---|---|---|---|---|
| Pamelia | 0.00 | 0.00 | NY 12 – Watertown, Clayton | Western terminus |
| Pamelia | 1.15 | 1.85 | I-81 – Canada, Syracuse | Exit 161 (I-81) |
| Pamelia | 1.89 | 3.04 | NY 37 – Ogdensburg, Watertown | Hamlet of Pamelia Center |
| Le Ray | 5.14 | 8.27 | US 11 – Fort Drum, Gouverneur, Watertown | Hamlet of Calcium |
| Le Ray | 6.79 | 10.93 | NY 283 west / Pearl Street Road – Watertown, Fort Drum | Eastern terminus of NY 283 |
| Le Ray | 8.37 | 13.47 | NY 3 – Carthage, Watertown | Eastern terminus |
1.000 mi = 1.609 km; 1.000 km = 0.621 mi

== See also ==
- List of county routes in Jefferson County, New York
