= 778 (disambiguation) =

778 is the year 778 AD.

778 may also refer to:

- 778 (number)
- Area code 778, an area code in British Columbia, Canada
- 778 Theobalda, a minor planet orbiting the Sun in the main asteroid belt
- 777-8, Boeing airliner

== See also ==
- List of highways numbered 778
