= Interstate 781 =

Highway in New York

Interstate 781
- Paul Cerjan Memorial Highway
- Map of I-781 highlighted in red and NY 971Q in blue

Route information
- Auxiliary route of I-81
- Maintained by NYSDOT
- Length: 4.3 mi (6.9 km)
- Existed: April 13, 2009–present
- History: Completed December 6, 2012
- NHS: Entire route

Major junctions
- West end: I-81 in Pamelia
- East end: US 11 in Le Ray

Location
- Country: United States
- State: New York
- Counties: Jefferson

Highway system
- Interstate Highway System; Main; Auxiliary; Suffixed; Business; Future; New York Highways; Interstate; US; State; Reference; Parkways
← NY 747	→ I-787

Interstate 781 (I-781) is an auxiliary Interstate Highway north of Watertown in Jefferson County, New York. The route extends for 4.3 miles (6.9 km) from an interchange with I-81 in Pamelia to the main entrance of Fort Drum in Le Ray. It also has one intermediate interchange with US Route 11 (US 11) just west of Fort Drum. I-781 is four lanes wide and serves as the principal travel corridor into and out of the post. The freeway is ceremoniously designated as the Paul Cerjan Memorial Highway in honor of Paul G. Cerjan, a late US Army lieutenant general who oversaw a $1.2-billion (equivalent to $3.82 billion in 2024) expansion of Fort Drum in the 1980s.

The original designation for I-781 was New York State Route 781 (NY 781). On April 13, 2009, the Federal Highway Administration (FHWA) designated NY 781 as a future Interstate Highway corridor and as "Future I-781". The I-781 designation officially took effect when the highway was completed and opened to traffic on December 6, 2012.

== Route description ==
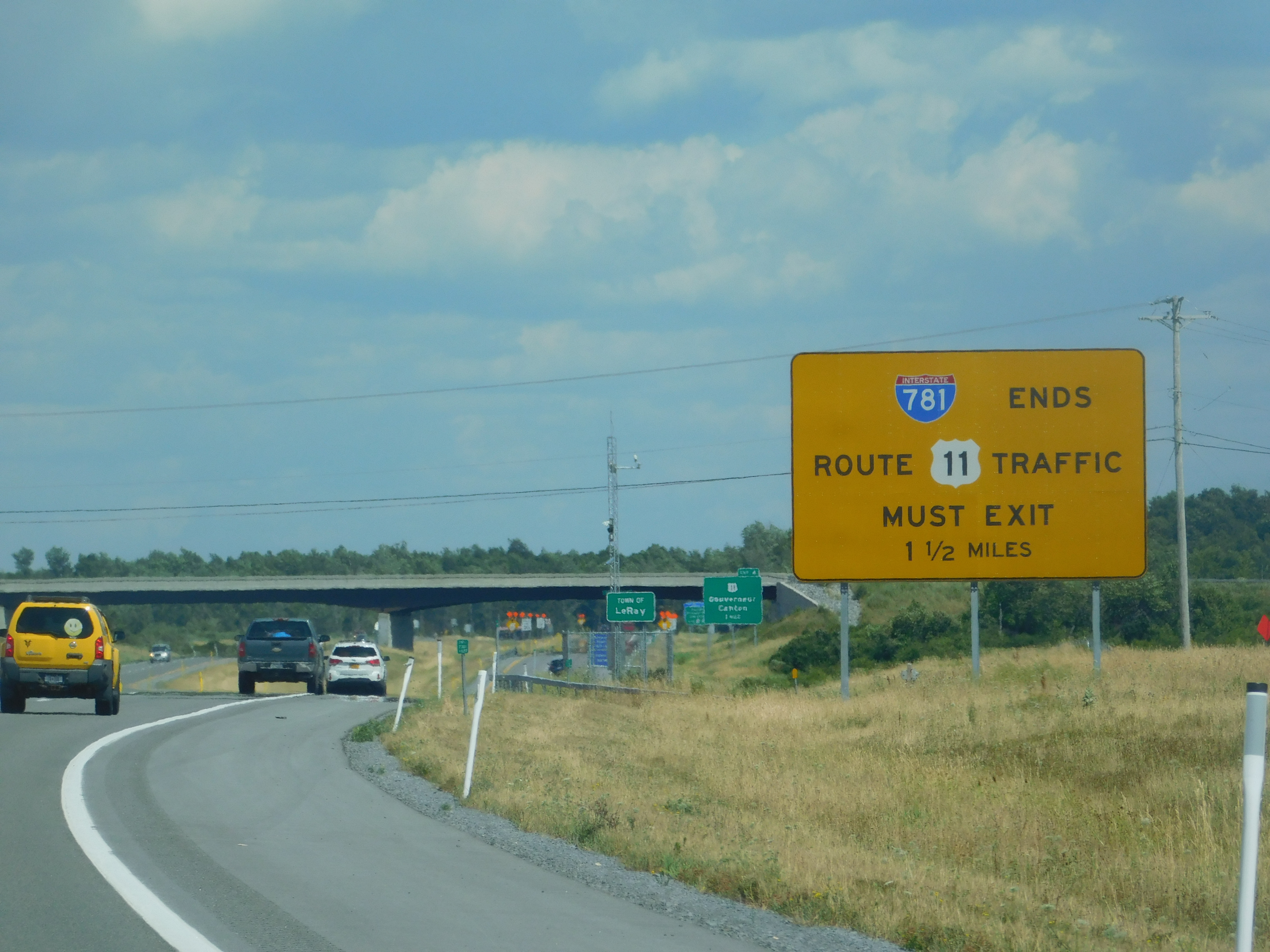
I-781 signage denoting its ending near Fort Drum

I-781 begins at I-81 exit 161, a trumpet interchange located 0.7 miles (1.1 km) north of exit 160 (NY 342) in the town of Pamelia. It proceeds to the east, roughly paralleling NY 342 as it heads toward Fort Drum. I-781 ends at an interchange with US 11 just west of Fort Drum, but the roadway continues east as Iraqi Freedom Drive, which is maintained by the New York State Department of Transportation (NYSDOT) as NY 971Q up to the bridge over CSX Transportation's rail line. The highway is four lanes wide, with two lanes for each direction,except at the main gate of Fort Drum, where it is six lanes wide (four lanes eastbound).

== History ==
=== Origins and funding ===
By 2003, NYSDOT had begun to evaluate potential ways to improve Fort Drum's access to I-81. Three alternatives were considered: the construction of a new highway that would run north of NY 342 and directly connect I-81 to the main gate of Fort Drum, the construction of a new route to the south of NY 342 that would link I-81 to US 11 southwest of the post's main gate, and improving the existing NY 342. In November 2005, NYSDOT officials announced that the southern route had been chosen and that it would cost $64 million (equivalent to $98.5 million in 2024) to construct. However, just two months later, NYSDOT announced that they now favored the northern alignment after receiving input from area residents and the US Army. According to NYSDOT Commissioner Thomas Madison, the new alignment would have less of a negative impact on future development around Fort Drum and cost $7 million (equivalent to $10.4 million in 2024) less to construct.

The proposed highway was initially designated as NY 781 by NYSDOT. On February 11, 2008, NYSDOT submitted an application to the American Association of State Highway and Transportation Officials (AASHTO) requesting that NY 781 be designated as I-781. The FHWA designated NY 781 as a future Interstate Highway corridor on April 13, 2009; however, the I-781 designation was not officially assigned at this time as per US Code an Interstate Highway designation can only be assigned to a completed highway built to Interstate Highway standards. As a result, the FHWA stipulated that the highway could only be referred to as "Future I-781" until I-781 was completed.

The project received $724,000 (equivalent to $1.03 million in 2024) in funding from the US Department of Transportation (USDOT) in June 2008. Another $1.43 million (equivalent to $1.99 million in 2024) was granted by USDOT in January 2010. The project had been nominated to receive $95 million (equivalent to $133 million in 2024) in funding through the Transportation Investment Generating Economic Recovery (TIGER) grant program; however, the application was rejected in February 2010. NYSDOT officials had seen the funding as a way to free up money for other projects in the area rather than funding that was necessary to construct I-781. Much of the project—projected to cost between $106 million and $113 million (equivalent to $148 million and $158 million in 2024)—was funded through several state and local sources, with at least $16.6 million (equivalent to $23.2 million in 2024) coming from NYSDOT.

=== Construction and opening ===
In April 2009, project engineers discovered that Indiana bats—an endangered species of bat—live in the area in and surrounding the proposed right-of-way of the Fort Drum Connector (I-781). As a result, several concessions were made, including clearing trees during the winter season while the bats hibernate in caves, purchasing and setting aside land to replace those lands lost during construction, and leaving trees in the 40 to 50 feet (12 to 15 m) of land alongside the highway that would typically be cleared to serve as embankments. The last of the three changes preserved 21 acres (8.5 ha) of forest. NYSDOT installed guardrails along the length of I-781 to make up for the narrower shoulders. The site preparation contract—which included the clearing of trees along the proposed I-781 right-of-way—was awarded to The Delaney Group on December 26, 2009. Work on this portion of the project took place from February 2010 to May 31, 2010, and cost $722,000 (equivalent to $1.01 million in 2024).

NYSDOT had originally planned on opening the bidding process for the construction of I-781 itself on April 1, 2010; however, the date was pushed back to May 6 due to the lack of an approved state budget. The state previously had plans to award the contract as early as December 2009; however, the earlier date was conditional on the allocation of enough funds for the project by that time. On July 20, NYSDOT announced that a $56.5-million (equivalent to $79.1 million in 2024) contract was let to Lancaster Development of Richmondville to construct the freeway. Work on the highway began the week of July 20, and a formal groundbreaking ceremony was held on August 4. Total completion of the project was originally slated for August 2012; however, it was ultimately pushed back to the end of November. The highway was opened to traffic on December 6, 2012.

On July 3, 2012, I-781 was ceremoniously designated as the Paul Cerjan Memorial Highway in honor of Paul G. Cerjan, a US Army lieutenant general from Rome who died in April 2011. Cerjan was the Assistant Commander for Support of the 10th Mountain Division in the mid-1980s, during which time he developed and supervised a $1.2-billion (equivalent to $3.82 billion in 2024) project that expanded Fort Drum (the home base of the 10th Mountain Division) from a small reserve training center to a full military installation.

Beginning with I-781, NYSDOT is using mileage-based exit numbering for all new Interstate Highway designations as part of the 2009 Manual on Uniform Traffic Control Devices (MUTCD) regulations phasing in distance-based exit numbers. Exit 1, westbound only, initially used cardinal directions N and S for access to I-81; in 2015 the letters became A (northbound) and B (southbound).

== Exit list ==
The entire route is in Jefferson County.

Location	mi	km	Exit	Destinations	Notes
Pamelia	0.0	0.0	1	I-81 – Watertown, Canada	Western terminus; signed as exits 1A (north) and 1B (south); exit 162 on I-81
Le Ray	4.7	7.6	4	US 11 – Gouverneur, Canton	
Le Ray	4.9	7.9	–	Fort Drum Main Gate	Eastern terminus; access via NY 971Q
1.000 mi = 1.609 km; 1.000 km = 0.621 mi
