= Watertown City School District =

School district in New York, United States

Location
- Watertown, Jefferson, New York, 13601; United States

District information
- Type: Local School District
- Motto: Our Children, Our Future
- Grades: K–12
- Superintendent: Dr. Larry C. Schmiegel
- Asst. superintendent(s): Tina Lane, Stacey Eger-Converse
- Schools: 8
- NCES District ID: 3630120
- District ID: NY-222000010000

Students and staff
- District mascot: Cyclones
- Colors: Purple & white

Other information
- Website: www.watertowncsd.org

Watertown City School District is a school district headquartered in Watertown, New York. It was first started in 1802, when the first school was erected.

In addition to Watertown, it includes a very small portion of Calcium census-designated place. The district includes sections of the towns of LeRay, Pamelia, Rutland, and Watertown.

== Schools ==
Secondary:

- Watertown High School
- Case Middle School

Primary:

- Elementary schools:
  - H. T. Wiley School
  - Knickerbocker
  - North
  - Ohio
  - Sherman
  - Starbuck

== Notable people ==
- Viggo Mortensen, American Actor, Best Known for the film Lord of the Rings and The Green Book.
- Robert Lansing, U.S. Secretary of State, Inducted November 2, 2001
- Richard A. Dillan, Comic Book Artist, best known for his illustrations on Superman, Batman, Wonder Woman, Green Lantern and Blackhawk. Inducted 2020.
- Mary-Margaret Humes, Actor, won the Miss Florida USA pageant and was third runner up in the 1975 Miss USA. Inducted 2020.
- Mary Gay Scanlon, member of the United States House of Representatives. Inducted 2020.
- Jim Berkman, head coach at Salisbury University. Inducted 2020.
- Robert Purcell, financial advisor to the Rockefeller Family. Inducted June 13, 2014.
