= Watertown High School (New York) =

High school in Watertown, New York, United States

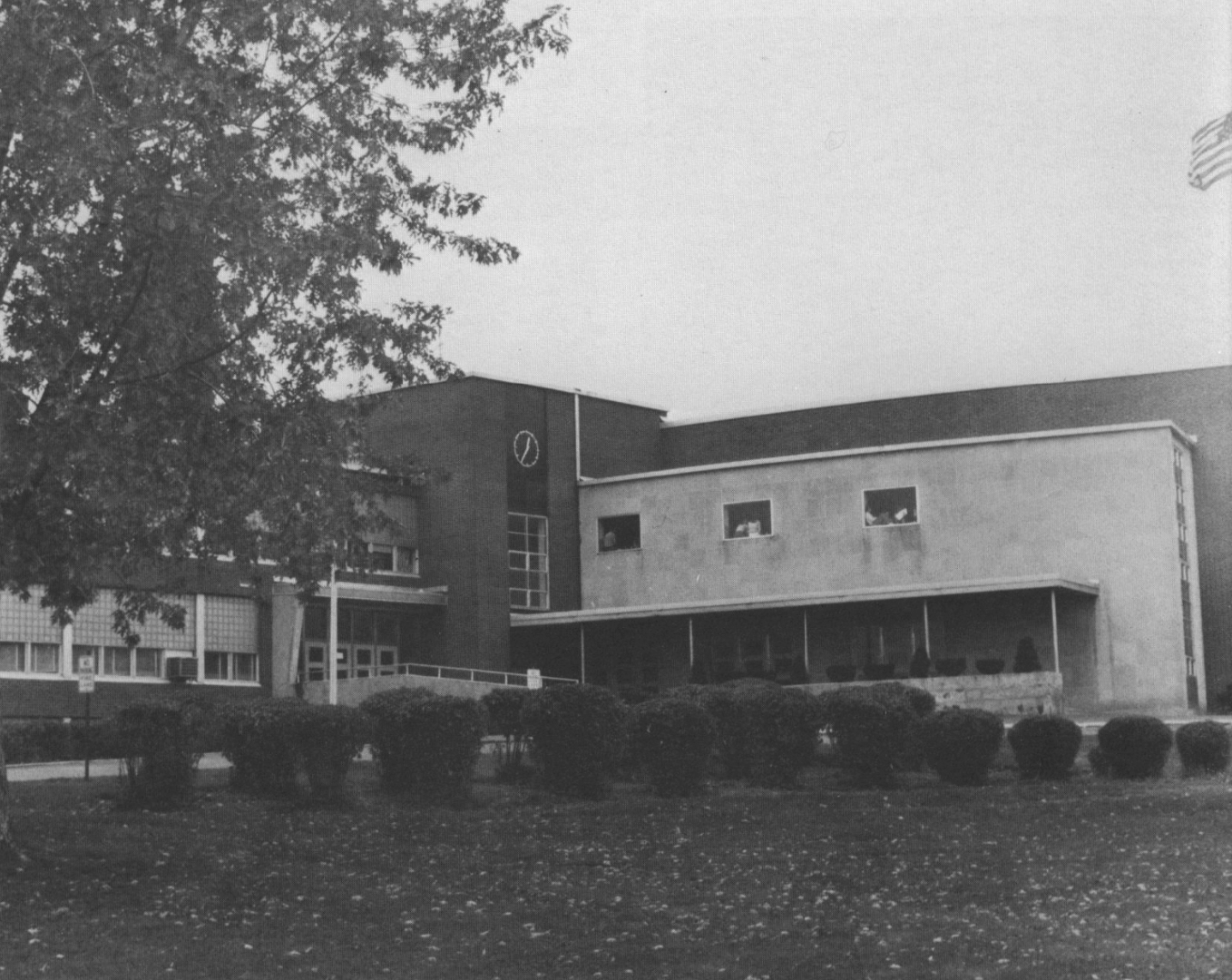
- The current high school in 1977

Location
- 1335 Washington St; Watertown, (Jefferson County), New York 13601; United States
- Coordinates: 43.9572°N 75.9129°W

Information
- School type: Public school (government funded), high school
- School district: Watertown City School District
- NCES District ID: 3630120
- Superintendent: Dr. Larry Schmiegel
- CEEB code: 335815
- NCES School ID: 363012004057
- Faculty: 84.33 (on an FTE basis)
- Grades: 9–12
- Gender: Coeducational
- Enrollment: 1,139 (2023-2024)
- Student to teacher ratio: 13.51
- Campus: Town: Remote
- Colors: Purple and White
- Mascot: Cyclones

Watertown High School (WHS) is a public high school located in Watertown, Jefferson County, New York, U.S.A., and is the only high school operated by the Watertown City School District.

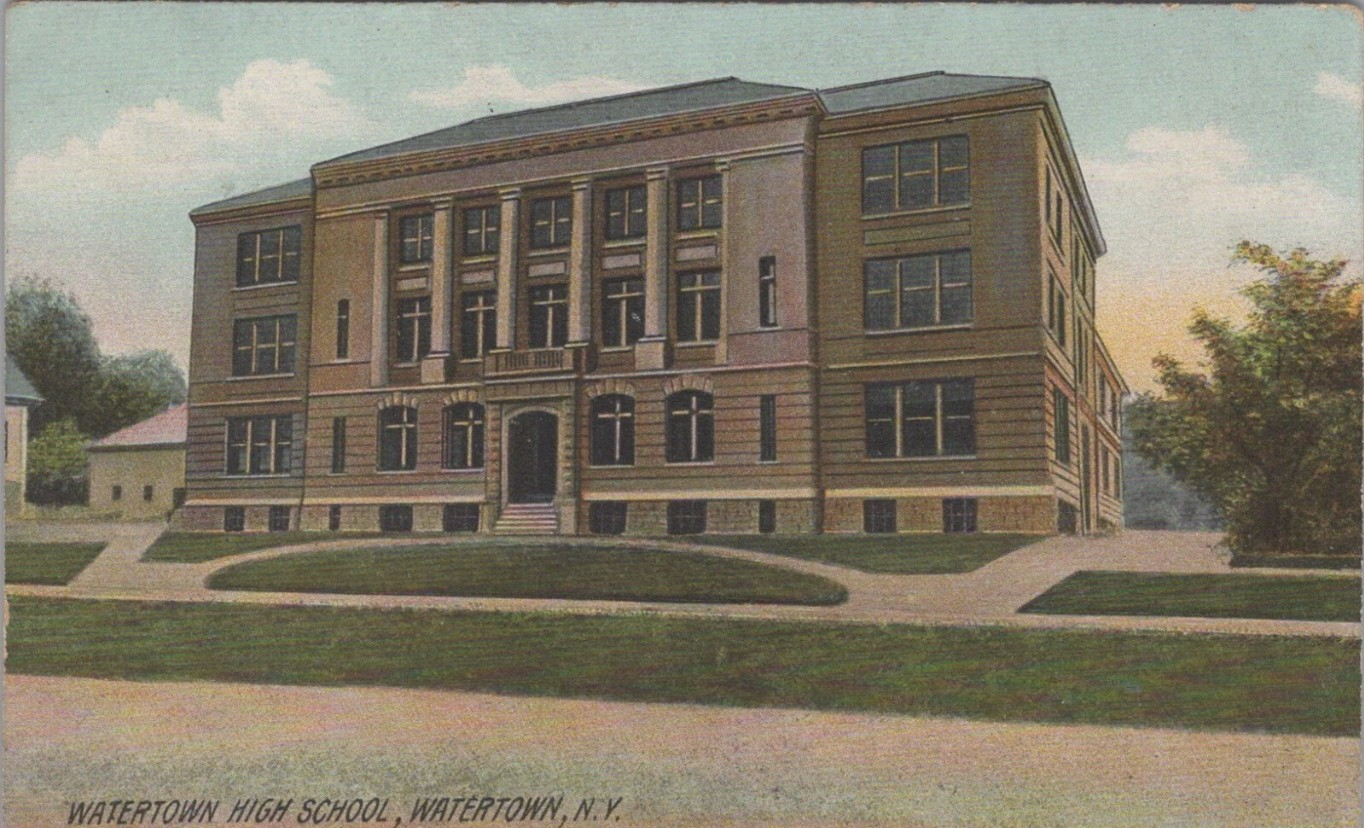
Watertown High School, Watertown, NY, circa 1905

Gary M. Jones became principal of the high school in 1898 and remained its leader until 1906. In 1910, he again became its principal, remaining such until at least 1932. The school's chapter of the National Honor Society is named for him.

As of 1917, the school had 25 teachers for 719 enrolled students with an average daily attendance of 591. Among the graduating class of 87, 30 attended college, 3 continued their studies at normal schools or normal colleges, and 10 entered professional or technical schools. Instruction included Latin, French, German, history, English, physics, botany, bookkeeping, shorthand, typewriting, and chorus and the rudiments of music.

On Monday, June 25, 1934, three senior students drowned in Lake Ontario on their class picnic, just days before their Wednesday graduation. Their boat swamped when the fourteen-foot dinghy meant to hold five people was overloaded with eleven.

In October 1954, four male students confessed to throwing tomatoes at Senator Irving M. Ives, then a Republican candidate for Governor of New York, at a rally in Watertown. The students apologized in a note sent to the high school's principal Albert B. Scholl. Ives and his wife, who was also splattered, accepted their apology.

As of 2026, the principal is Leslie Atkinson.

== Athletics ==
The school's athletic teams, which compete under the name "The Cyclones," include boys and girls lacrosse, track and field, and girls flag football.

The school has a turf field and ten tennis courts, including three that can also be used for pickleball. It also has a basketball court.

== Notable alumni ==
Notable alumni include:

- Robert Lansing
- Viggo Mortensen
- Perley A. Pitcher
