= LeRay Mansion =

Historic house in New York, United States

- U.S. National Register of Historic Places
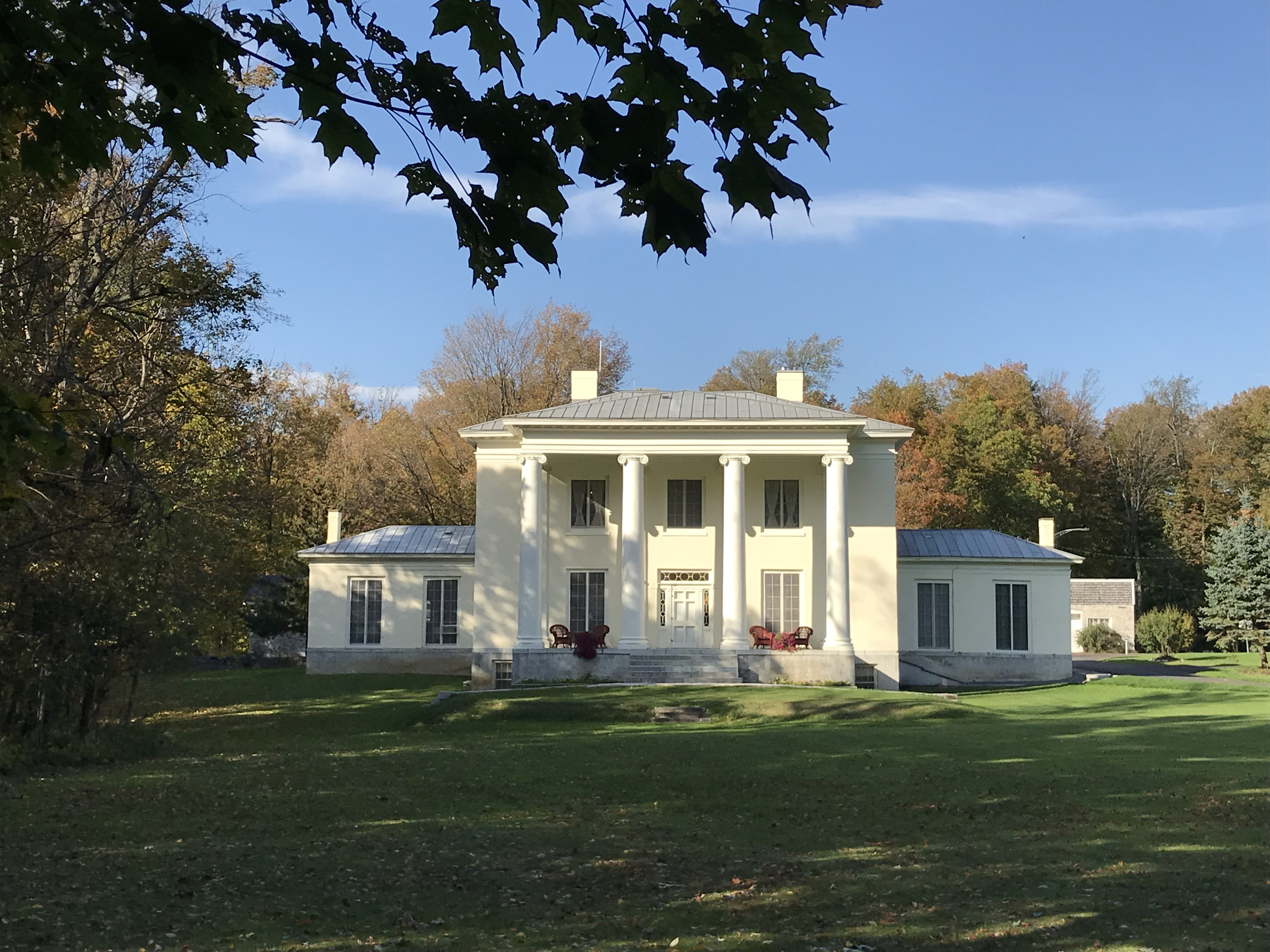
- The LeRay Mansion house on the grounds of the former village of LeRaysville. Now on the grounds of Ft. Drum, NY

- Location within New York Location within the United States
- Nearest city: Black River, New York
- Coordinates: 44°3′0″N 75°45′48″W
- Area: 11.5 acres (4.7 ha)
- Built: 1808
- Architect: Beaudrey, Dr.
- Architectural style: Classical Revival
- NRHP reference No.: 74001245
- Added to NRHP: July 11, 1974

LeRay (pronounced /’leh-ray/) Mansion is a National Register Listed Historic District located in Fort Drum, New York.

The LeRay Mansion was originally built as the estate for James LeRay de Chaumont. LeRay originally came in order to regain his family's fortune. Jacques Donatien LeRay de Chaumont, James LeRay's father, was a French entrepreneur who loaned a considerable portion of his fortune to support the American Revolution. Jacques LeRay was the single largest financial supporter of the American Revolution from France, outspending the French government. This earned Jacques LeRay the title "French Father of the American Revolution." Jacques LeRay was a gracious host to members of the new Continental government at his estate in Passy, France. These guests included John Adams, Silas Deane, Arthur Lee, James Madison, and Benjamin Franklin, the latter of whom taught English to James LeRay.

Jacques never visited America, but by the time the American Revolutionary War ended, Jacques had nearly bled his fortune dry in his support. Instead of making the journey himself, Jacques sent his son, James, on his behalf to collect their fortune. Despite years of effort, James was never able to secure full compensation for his father's loan. Benjamin Franklin wrote an impassioned letter to George Washington that was able to secure a partial payment.

While James LeRay was pleading for payment on his family's loan, he met and married a wealthy woman named Grace Coxe. The Coxe family made their own fortune through a successful newspaper business in New Jersey. After their marriage, James became a naturalized American citizen and believed he could reclaim his family fortune by investing in land in northern New York. The couple had three children : Therese, Vincent, and Alexander.

James was able to obtain ownership of thousands of acres within the tri-county area in the North Country (Jefferson, Lewis, and St. Lawrence County), which included over 360,000 acres of land. Setting aside 200 acres for his estate, James LeRay built the LeRay Mansion.

The first mansion was built around 1808. According to numerous records, there was a fire at this mansion in the 1820s. Some historians argue whether the fire destroyed the first mansion, and it is unclear whether the building that stands today was a rebuild or a completely different mansion. In either case, a mansion was rebuilt around 1826–1827. While there were still Native Americans residing in the area, there were no significant European-American settlements or infrastructure. James LeRay intended to rebuild his family's fortune by selling off tracts of his land to build European-American settlements. James LeRay was not discriminatory towards Christian religious denominations and encouraged settlement of Quakers, Catholics, and Protestant denominations. He gave them land for their congregations' churches and meeting houses. James LeRay was ultimately unsuccessful in reclaiming his family's fortune and almost went bankrupt. He transferred the ownership of the estate to his oldest son, Vincent, for whom Cape Vincent is named. Vincent owned the Mansion briefly before selling the property to Jules Rene Payen a geologic engineer, gun-powder chemist, and fellow French immigrant.

The LeRay Mansion remained in the Payen family for several generations. Their surname changed from Payen to Phelps to Anderson as the house was passed down through the family's daughters. While the estate was in the possession of the Anderson family in 1936, the New York State Land Bank foreclosed on the property.

In 1936, Colonel Harold Remington (Ret.), a local resident of Watertown, New York, and a World War I veteran, purchased the property and carried out repairs and renovations. Some of the repairs included adding electricity and plumbing to the Mansion. The house was only briefly in the possession of the Remington family as in 1941, the United States Army took ownership of the estate for the expansion of Pine Camp. In 1941, with the outbreak of World War II, the federal government granted the expansion of Pine Camp by 75,000 acres. This expansion displaced not only the Remington family from the LeRay Mansion, but over 525 families from five villages and over 360 farms: Sterlingville; Woods Mills; Lewisburg; LeRaysville; Alpina.

Over the years, the Army used the Mansion for temporary lodging and an officer's club. When the 10th Mountain Division was reactivated at Fort Drum in 1984, General Carpenter was asked to live at the LeRay Mansion. This briefly gave the LeRay Mansion the nickname "the General's Mansion." In 1988, General Carpenter gave the mansion to the Army Morale, Welfare, and Recreation (MWR) program. MWR used the mansion as a "Bed and Breakfast" style lodging for visiting VIPs and officials. The Lodging Program generously furnished the Mansion with pieces in keeping with the style of the early nineteenth century and the commanding general began a tradition of hosting members of the community there for holiday celebrations.

In 2018, the LeRay Mansion was turned over to the Fort Drum Public Works Environmental Cultural Resources Program, in part due to the efforts of Lieutenant General Piatt. Today, the space is used as a free event space for the greater Fort Drum community and museum. As a part of their mission to identify, protect, and manage the ancestral places and historic era archeological sites, Cultural Resources works to preserve one of Fort Drum's most valued historic resources, the LeRay Mansion. There are daily tours held at the LeRay Mansion and the surrounding grounds where anyone is welcome. The Mansion is open on weekdays from 0900 to 1500. Check out the Leray Mansion website (leraymansion.com) for questions, to reserve the mansion for an event, or to check out current and future exhibits at the LeRay Mansion.

== Gallery ==
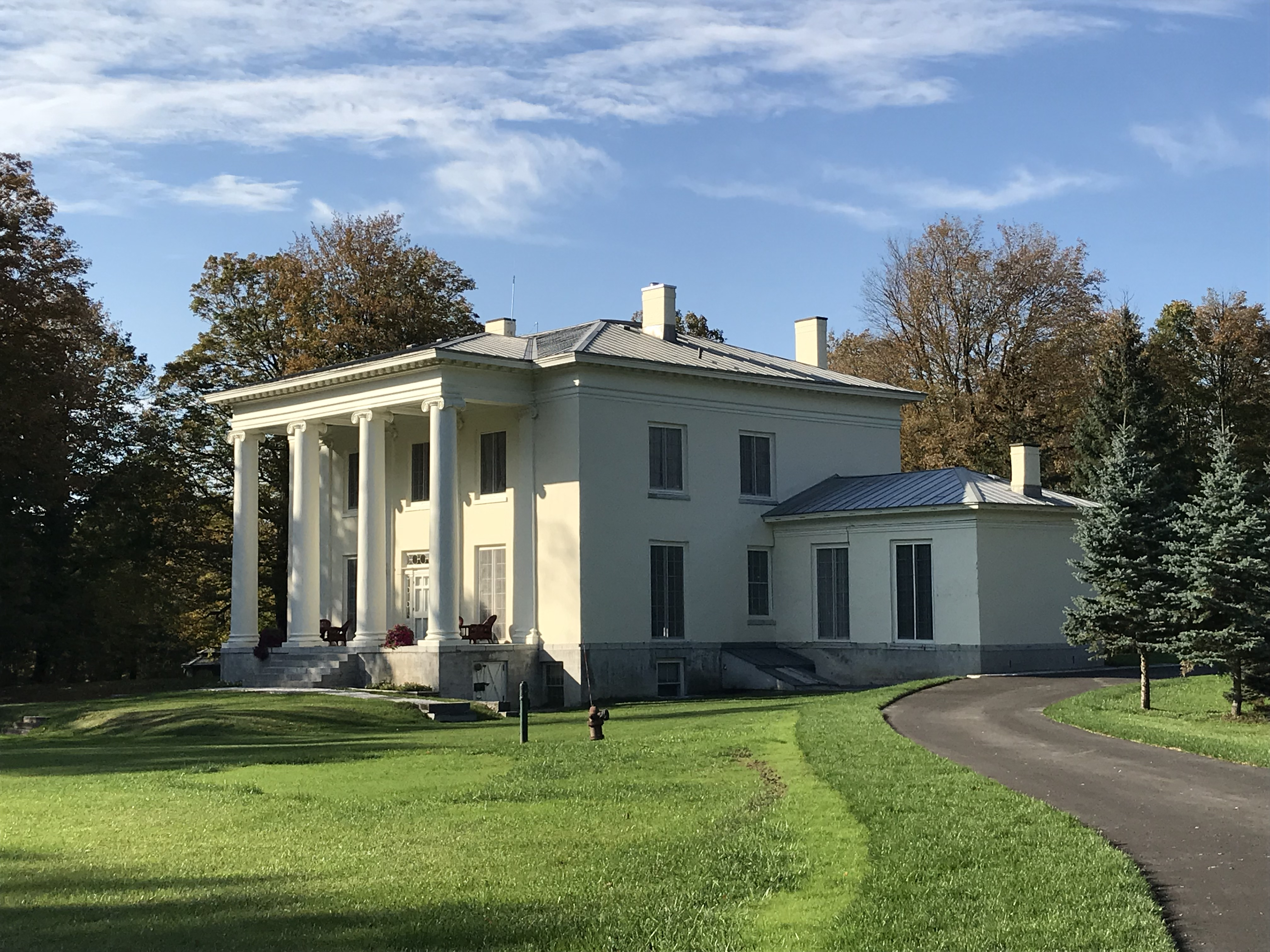
The main house from the approach drive

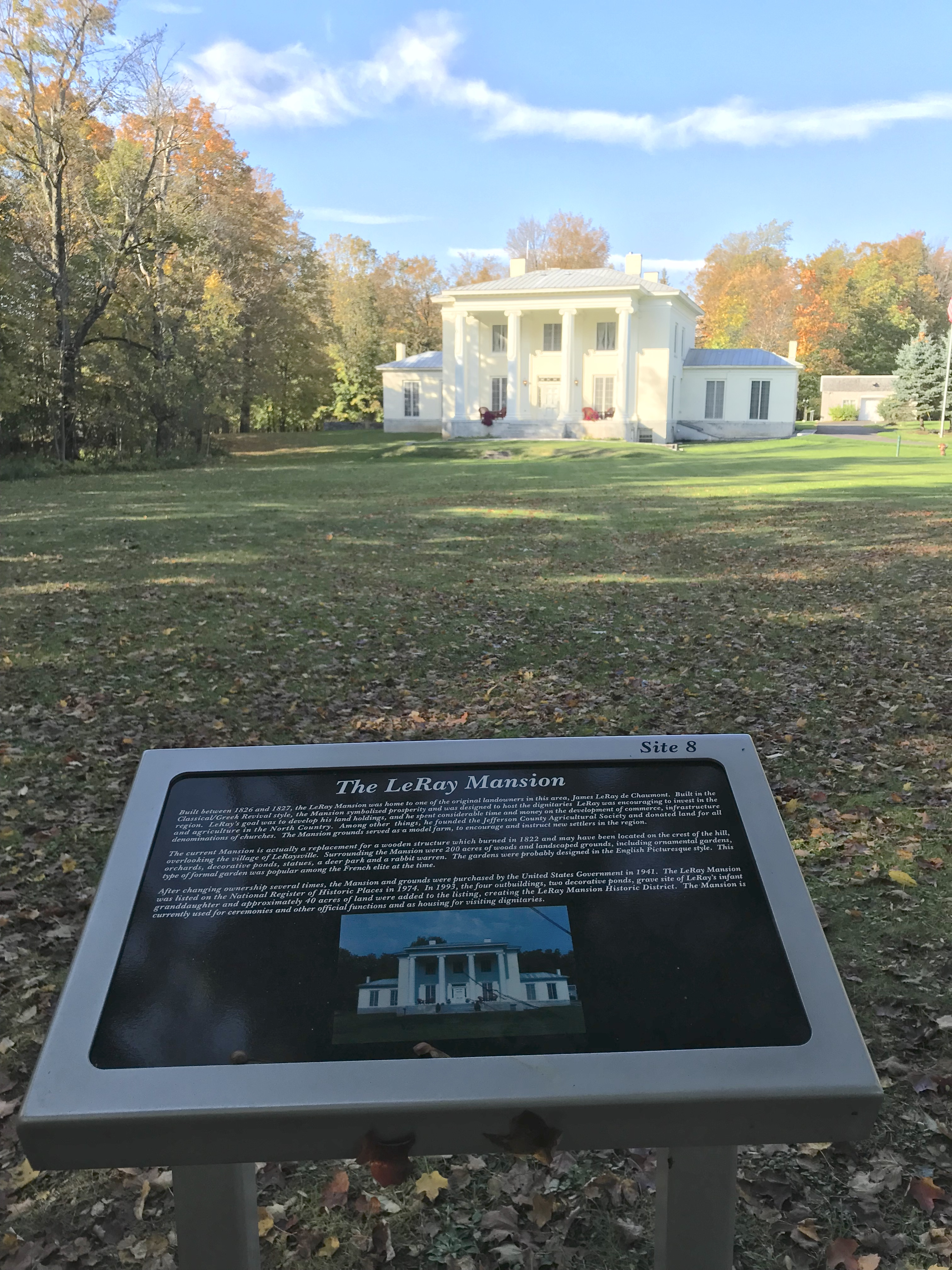
An information sign in the front lawn

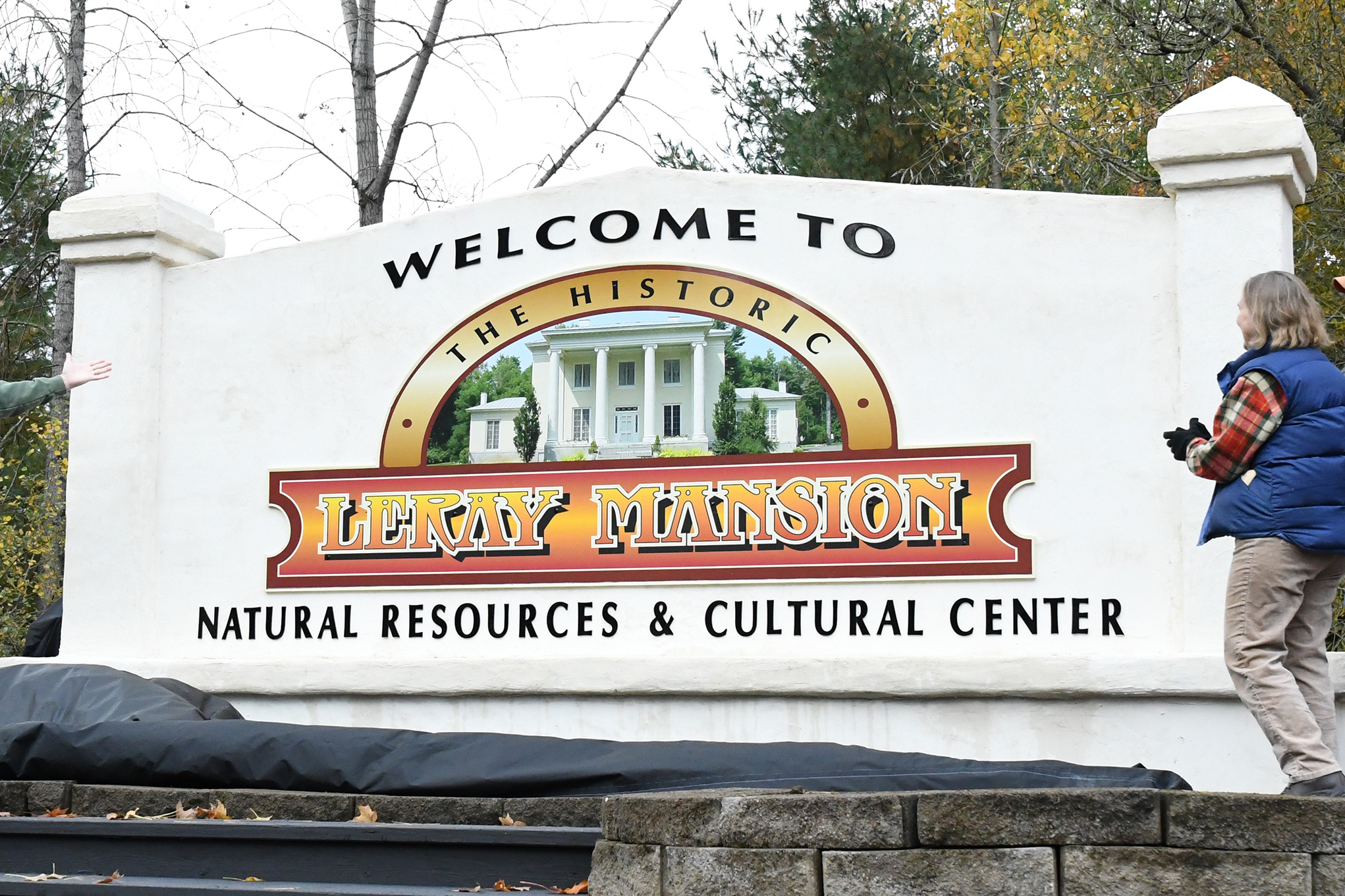
LeRay Mansion sign located on the drive

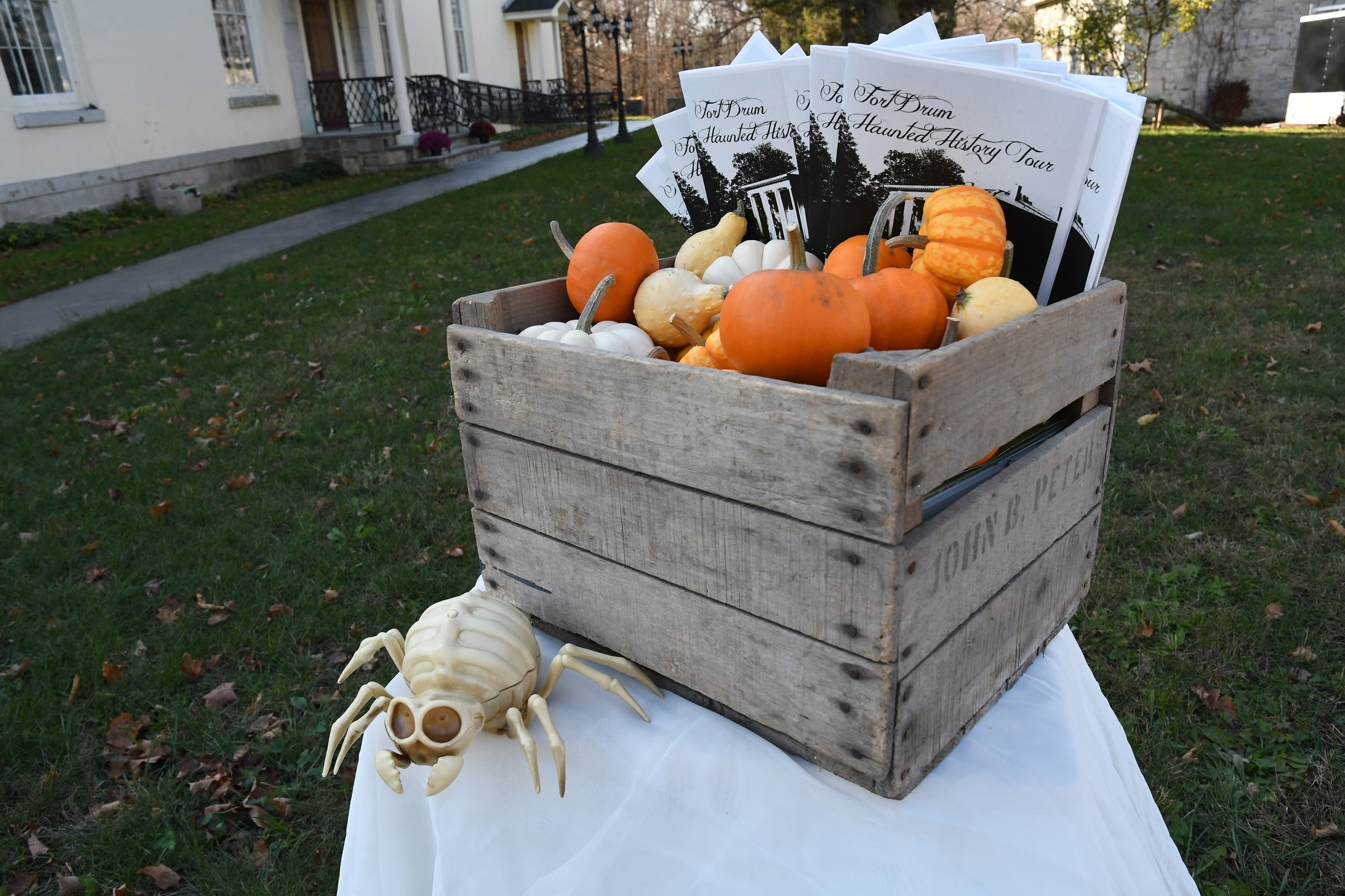
LeRay Mansion Haunted History Tour that occurs every year in October. Check out the website leraymansion.com for more info!

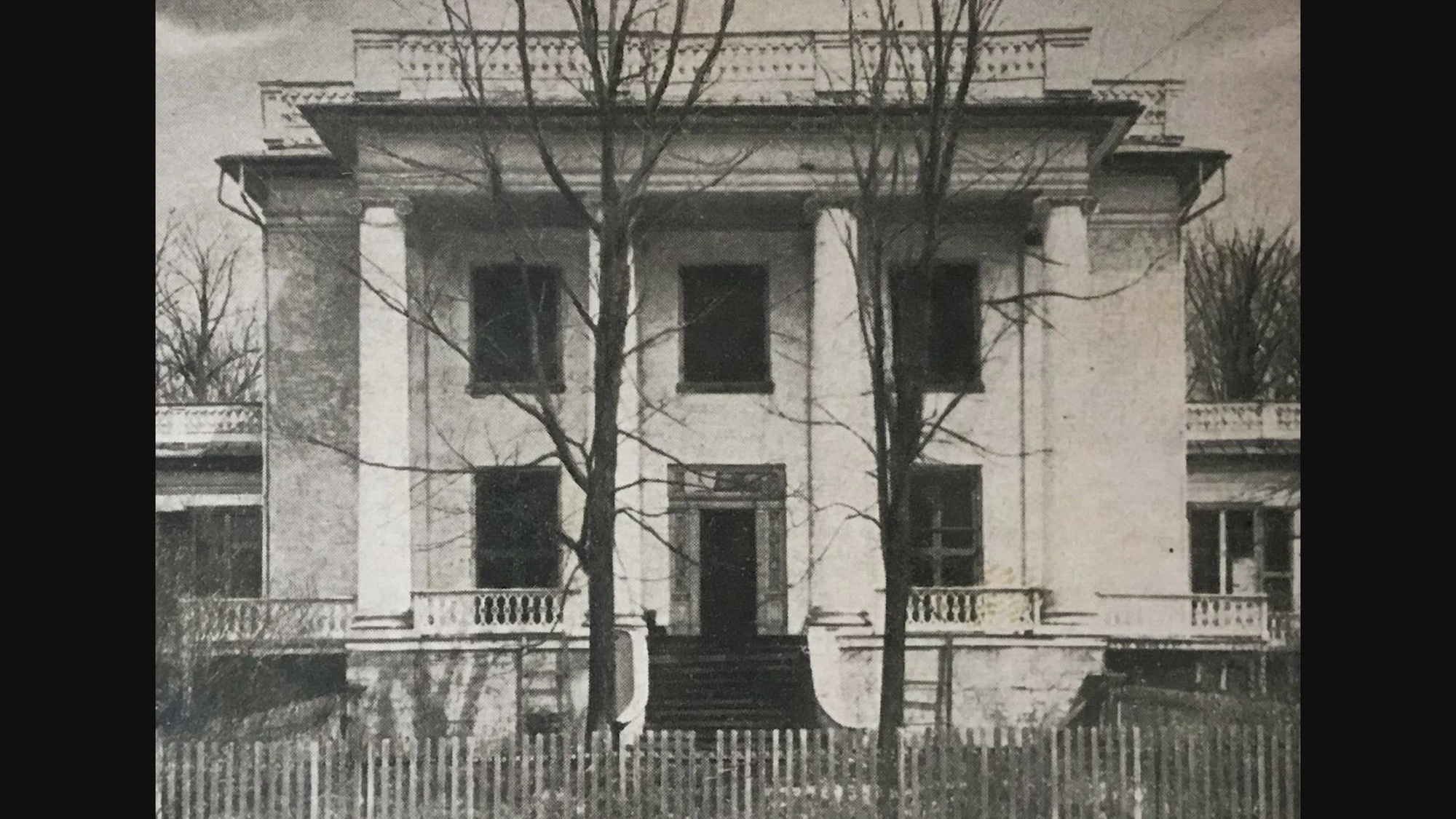
Old photo of the LeRay Mansion with original balustrades
