= List of highways numbered 779 =

The following highways are numbered 779:

== United States ==
- LA 779 (former)
- MD 779
- PR-779
- FM 779

Preceded by 778	Lists of highways 779	Succeeded by 780
