= First Presbyterian Church (Gouverneur, New York) =

Historic church in New York, United States

- First Presbyterian Church Complex
- U.S. National Register of Historic Places
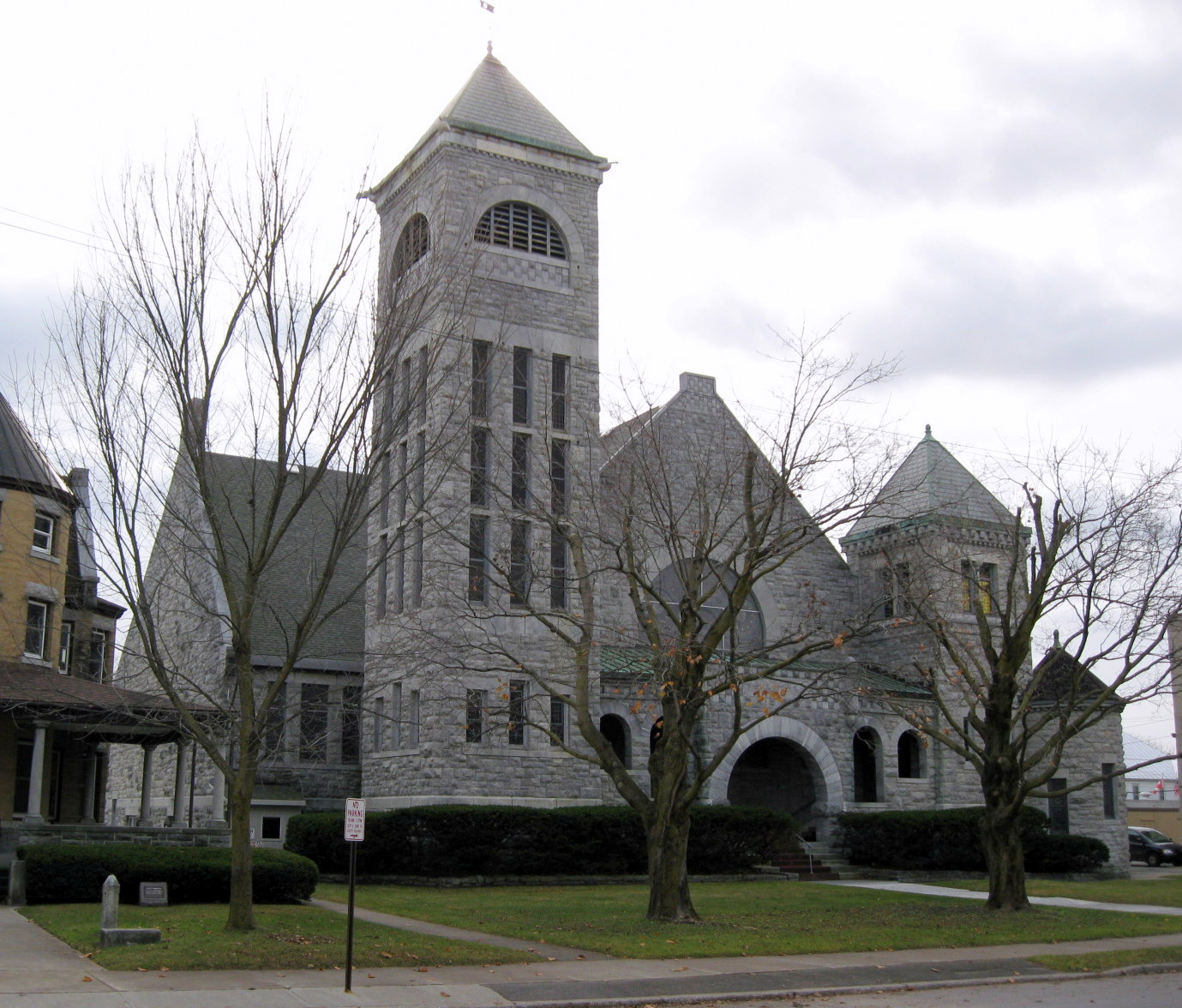
- First Presbyterian Church, November 2009

- Location within New York Location within the United States
- Location: 22 Church St., Gouverneur, New York
- Coordinates: 44°20′05″N 75°28′14″W
- Area: 1.0 acre (0.40 ha)
- Built: 1892-1893, 1904
- Architect: Badgley, Sidney Rose
- Architectural style: Romanesque, Queen Anne, Colonial Revival
- NRHP reference No.: 15000607
- Added to NRHP: September 17, 2015

First Presbyterian Church Complex is a historic Presbyterian church located at Gouverneur, St. Lawrence County, New York. The complex consists of the Romanesque Revival style church (1892-1893) and Queen Anne style manse (1904). The church has a modified cruciform plan with a cross-gable roof and constructed of both roughhewn and smoothly dressed Gouverneur marble. The front facade features an entrance loggia, with unequal square towers with hipped roofs flanking it. The manse is constructed of yellow pressed brick and features a round three-story tower and verandah. The interior features Colonial Revival style design elements. The house was sold to the Gouverneur Historical Society in 1974 and houses a local history museum

It was listed on the National Register of Historic Places in 2015.
