= Louis L. Jabas =

American politician

Louis Jabas

Member of the Wisconsin State Assembly
- In office 1888–1890

Personal details
- Born: September 15, 1849 Sanfords Four Corners, New York
- Died: June 21, 1896 (aged 45) Appleton, Wisconsin
- Party: Democratic

Louis L. Jabas (September 15, 1849 – June 21, 1896) was an American farmer and politician.

== Background ==
Born in Sanfords Four Corners, New York, Jabas moved to the town of Grand Chute, Outagamie County, Wisconsin in 1862, where he worked as a farmer. He served as Grand Chute Town Treasurer from 1875 to 1878 and chairman of the Grand Chute Town Board from 1885 to 1889. From 1888 to 1890, Jabas served in the Wisconsin State Assembly as a Democrat.

Jabas died at his home in Appleton, Wisconsin.
