= LeRay Hotel =

- U.S. National Register of Historic Places
- Location within New York Location within the United States
- Location: Main and Noble Sts., Evans Mills, New York
- Coordinates: 44°5′16″N 75°48′28″W
- Area: less than one acre
- Built: 1828; 198 years ago
- Architect: Hoover, Capt. John
- Architectural style: Federal
- NRHP reference No.: 82001175
- Added to NRHP: October 29, 1982

LeRay Hotel, also known as Hoover Brick Hotel, is a historic hotel located at Evans Mills in Jefferson County, New York. It was completed in 1828 and is a two-story, Federal style brick structure with a shingled gable roof. According to an unproven legend which is almost certainly untrue, It was the site of the card game in which presidential son John Van Buren lost his mistress, Elena America Vespucci, a descendant of Amerigo Vespucci, to George Parish II of Ogdensburg, New York.

It was listed on the National Register of Historic Places in 1982.
