= List of highways numbered 780 =

The following highways are numbered 780:

== Australia ==
- Western Port Highway

== Canada ==
- Saskatchewan Highway 780

== United States ==
- Interstate 780
- Florida State Road 780
- Nevada State Route 780 (former)
- Ohio State Route 780 (former)
- Pennsylvania Route 780 (former)
- Pennsylvania Route 780 (current)
- Puerto Rico Highway 780
- Virginia State Route 780

Preceded by 779	Lists of highways 780	Succeeded by 781
