= 7th Engineer Battalion (United States) =

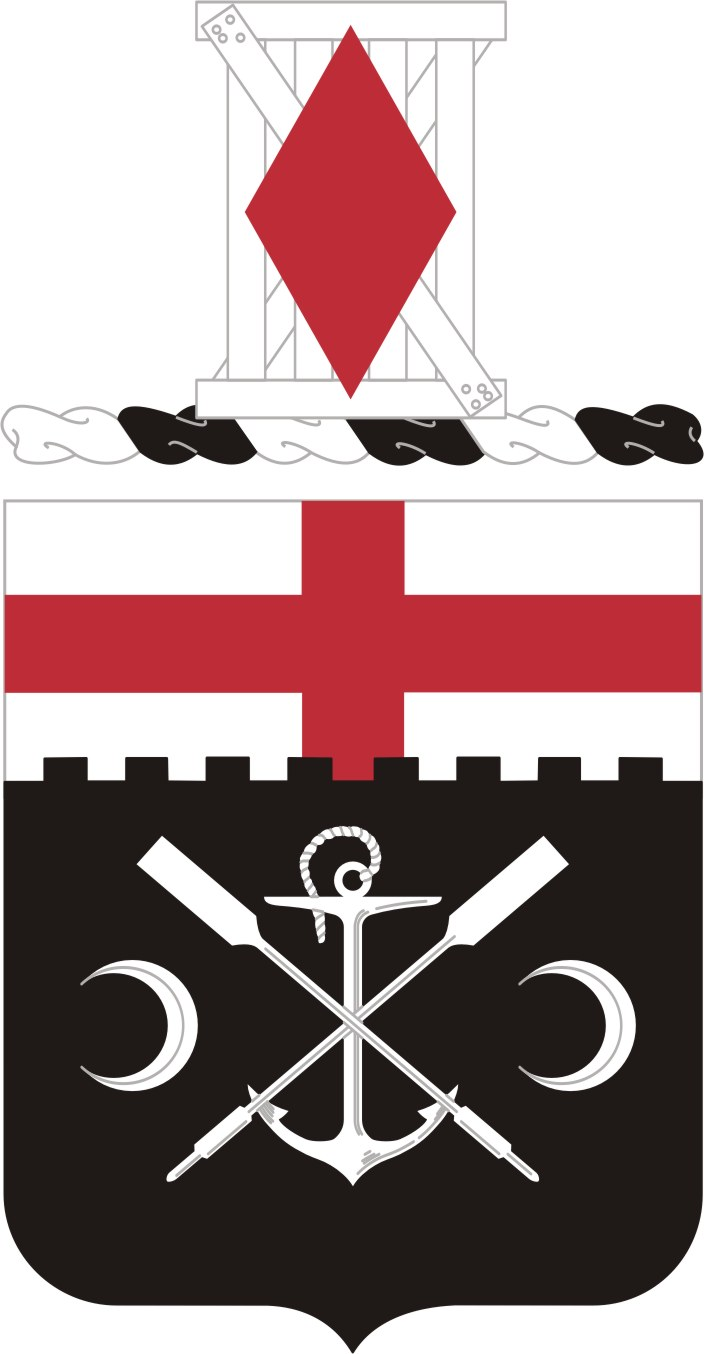
- Coat of arms
- Active: 1861
- Country: United States
- Branch: US Army Corps of Engineers
- Type: Combat engineer
- Size: Battalion
- Garrison/HQ: Fort Drum
- Nickname: Hammer
- Motto: Seven Times Tested By Fire

Commanders
- Current commander: LTC Ma, Jerrauld
- Notable commanders: Charles W. Comfort JR Michael N. Clancy; Mark Quander; Christopher Barron; Richard Pannel; Don T. Riley; Hugo J. Stark; Clement Flagler; Meriwether Lewis Walker; Lewis M. Adams; Daniel D. Pullen Wildurr Willing

The 7th Engineer Battalion was a combat engineer battalion unit of the United States Army located at Fort Drum, New York. This battalion falls under the 10th Mountain Division's 1st Brigade Combat Team. The battalion has the Brigade Combat Team's engineer companies, military intelligence company, and signal company.

== History ==
The 7th Engineer Battalion served from 1975 to 1992 with the 5th Infantry Division (United States) at what is now Fort Johnson, Louisiana. It was reactivated on 27 October 2006 at Fort Drum, New York under the 20th Engineer Brigade. It deployed to the Iraq War and the Afghanistan War (2001-2021) in 2009. In Iraq, the battalion provided tactical construction in support of United States Division - South, partnered with the Iraqi Army's 10th and 14th Field Engineer Regiments, and enhanced the civil capacity of Iraq via technical support for reconstruction projects. In Afghanistan, battalion soldiers conducted route clearance operations and provided firefighting support in the southern and eastern provinces, in support of NATO security operations. The battalion deployed again to eastern Afghanistan to conduct route clearance operations from October 2011 to October 2012.

On 17 October 2014, the 7th Engineer Battalion converted to become the 7th Brigade Engineer Battalion. This task organization includes the 693d Engineer Company (Sapper), 630th Engineer Company (Clearance), the 1st BCT's Military Intelligence Company, and the 1st BCT's Signal Company.

In December 2019 the Division announced the 1st Brigade Combat Team would deploy to Afghanistan. 7th Engineer Battalion under the command of LTC MacDonald went on to deploy with 1BCT to Afghanistan.

== Lineage ==
The battalion traces its history to a unit organized on 31 December 1861 in the Regular Army at Washington D.C., from new and existing companies of engineers as a provisional engineer battalion (constituted 28 July 1866 as the Battalion of Engineers)

- Expanded 14 March-7 June 1901 to form the 1st and 2d Battalions of Engineers (2d Battalion of Engineers—hereafter separate lineage)
- 1st Battalion of Engineers expanded, reorganized, and redesignated 1 July 1916 as the 1st Regiment of Engineers
- 1st Regiment of Engineers expanded 15 May 1917 to form the 1st, 6th, and 7th Regiments of Engineers (1st and 6th Regiments of Engineers—hereafter separate lineages)
- 7th Regiment of Engineers redesignated 29 August 1917 as the 7th Engineers
- Assigned 17 November 1917 to the 5th Division
- Inactivated (less Company A) 10 October 1921 at Camp Jackson, South Carolina
- Company A inactivated 1 October 1933 at Fort Benning, Georgia
- Redesignated 16 October 1939 as the 7th Engineer Battalion and activated at Fort Logan, Colorado
- Redesignated 28 May 1943 as the 7th Engineer Combat Battalion
- Inactivated 20 September 1946 at Camp Campbell, Kentucky, and Ladd Field, Alaska
- Activated 6 July 1948 at Fort Jackson, South Carolina
- Inactivated 30 April 1950 at Fort Jackson, South Carolina
- Activated 1 March 1951 at Indiantown Gap Military Reservation, Pennsylvania
- Inactivated 1 September 1953 at Indiantown Gap Military Reservation, Pennsylvania
- Redesignated 7 April 1954 as the 7th Engineer Battalion * Activated 25 May 1954 in Germany
- Inactivated 1 June 1957 at Fort Ord, California
- Activated 19 February 1962 at Fort Carson, Colorado
- Inactivated (less Company A) 15 December 1970 at Fort Carson, Colorado (Company A inactivated 6 August 1971 in Vietnam)
- Activated 21 July 1975 at Fort Polk, Louisiana
- Inactivated 15 December 1992 at Fort Polk, Louisiana, and relieved from assignment to the 5th Infantry Division
- Headquarters and Headquarters Company activated 19 October 2006 at Fort Drum, New York (Forward Support Company concurrently constituted and activated)
- Reflagged 14 June 2014 to become organic to 1st Brigade Combat Team, 10th Mountain Division
- Converted 17 October 2014 to become the 7th Brigade Engineer Battalion
- Deactivated in the fall 2024

== Distinctive unit insignia ==
- Description

A Silver color metal and enamel device 1 inch (2.54 cm) in height overall blazoned: Sable, an anchor debruised by two oars saltirewise between in fess two increscents all Argent; on a chief of the last embattled a cross Gules.

- Symbolism

Black and white were the old colors of the Engineer Corps. The anchor and oars device was the badge of the Engineers and Pontoniers of the Army of the Potomac where the old units of the regiment did such gallant service. The crescents are the device of General Winfield Scott and represent the service of the old company in 1846–1848 in the Mexican War. In France, the regiment served with great gallantry in the 5th Division. The crossing of the Meuse near Dun is indicated by the device in chief of the shield which is not only a cross for the crossing of the river but the device of the lords of Dun.

- Background

The distinctive unit insignia was originally approved for the 7th Engineer Regiment on 27 August 1926. It was redesignated for the 7th Engineer Battalion on 7 March 1940. It was redesignated for the 7th Engineer Combat Battalion on 13 May 1940. The insignia was redesignated for the 7th Engineer Battalion on 6 July 1954.

== Coat of arms ==
- Blazon
  - Shield

Sable, an anchor debruised by two oars saltirewise between in fess two increscents all Argent; on a chief of the last embattled a cross Gules.

  - Crest- On a wreath of the colors Argent and Sable a fusil Gules on a bridge bent Argent.
  - Motto SEVEN TIMES TESTED BY FIRE.
- Symbolism
  - Shield- Black and white were the old colors of the Engineer Corps. The anchor and oars device was the badge of the Engineers and Pontoniers of the Army of the Potomac where the old units of the regiment did such gallant service. The crescents are the device of General Winfield Scott and represent the service of the old company in 1846–1848 in the Mexican War. In France, the regiment served with great gallantry in the 5th Division. The crossing of the Meuse near Dun is indicated by the device in chief of the shield which is not only a cross for the crossing of the river but the device of the lords of Dun.
  - Crest- The crest well symbolizes the work of the regiment in the 5th Division. In the very rough work of 2 to 6 November 1918, the regiment was called upon to prove itself seven distinct times. The motto is a recollection of this.
- Background- The coat of arms was originally approved for the 7th Engineer Regiment on 8 April 1922. It was redesignated for the 7th Engineer Battalion and amended to update the history on 7 March 1940. It was redesignated for the 7th Engineer Combat Battalion on 13 May 1953. The insignia was redesignated for the 7th Engineer Battalion on 6 July 1954.

== Campaign participation credit ==
Civil War

- Peninsula
- Antietam
- Fredericksburg
- Chancellorsville
- Wilderness
- Spotsylvania
- Cold Harbor
- Petersburg
- Appomattox
- Virginia 1863

War with Spain

- Santiago

World War I

- St. Mihiel
- Meuse-Argonne
- Alsace 1918
- Lorraine 1918

World War II

- Normandy
- Northern France
- Rhineland
- Ardennes-Alsace
- Central Europe

Vietnam

Operation Iraqi Freedom

Operation Enduring Freedom

Operation Inherent Resolve
