= List of highways numbered 781 =

Route 781, or Highway 781, may refer to:

== Canada ==
- Alberta Highway 781
- Saskatchewan Highway 781

== Israel ==
- Route 781 (Israel)

== United Kingdom ==
- A781 road

== United States ==
- I-781
- SR 781
- KY 781
- MD 781
- SR 781
- SR 781
- PR-781

Preceded by 780	Lists of highways 781	Succeeded by 782
