= Pamelia, New York =

- Town
- Location within New York Location within the United States
- Coordinates: 44°2′29″N 75°53′41″W
- Country: United States
- State: New York
- County: Jefferson

Government
  - Type: Town Council
  - Town Supervisor: Lawrence C. Longway (R)
  - Town Council: Members' List: • Mark A. Eiss (R); • Timothy E. Kelly (D); • Donald Riordan (R); • Rusty Van Tassel (R)

Area
  - Total: 35.55 sq mi (92.08 km^{2})
  - Land: 34.10 sq mi (88.32 km^{2})
  - Water: 1.45 sq mi (3.75 km^{2})
- Elevation: 417 ft (127 m)

Population (2010)
  - Total: 3,160
  - Estimate (2016): 3,007
  - Density: 88.2/sq mi (34.05/km^{2})
- Time zone: UTC-5 (Eastern (EST))
  - Summer (DST): UTC-4 (EDT)
- ZIP Codes: 13601 (Watertown); 13616 (Calcium); 13637 (Evans Mills); 13656 (La Fargeville)
- Area code: 315
- FIPS code: 36-045-56209
- GNIS feature ID: 0979340
- Website: https://www.townofpamelia.gov/

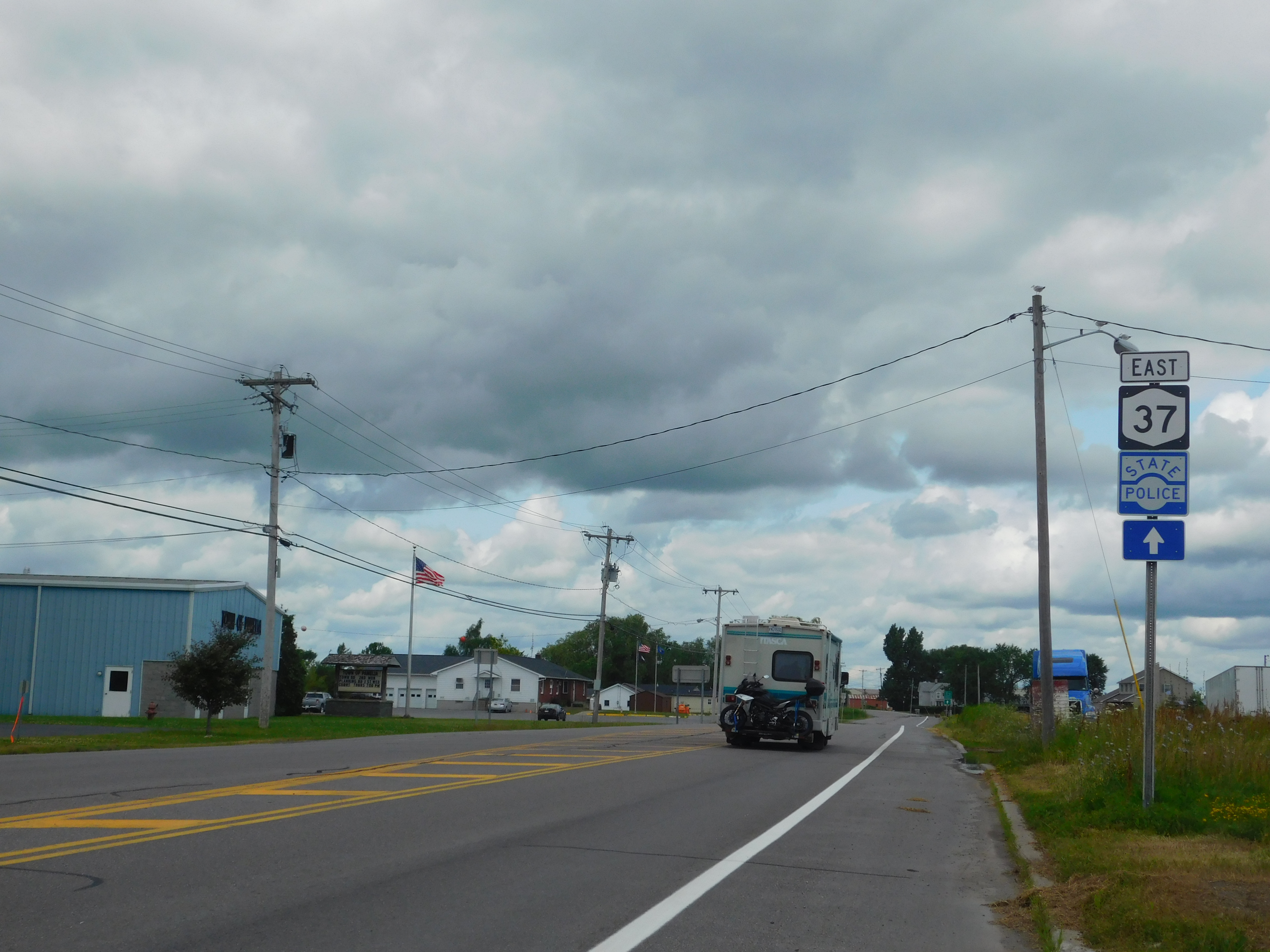
New York State Route 37 eastbound in Pamelia, New York

Pamelia is a town in Jefferson County, New York, United States. The population was 3,160 at the 2010 census, up from 2,897 in 2000. The town was named for Pamelia Williams, wife of landowner and developer General Jacob J. Brown.

Pamelia is in the north-central part of the county and is north of Watertown.

== History ==
The town was first permanently settled circa 1804.

The town was formed in 1819 from part of the town of Brownville. Around 1824, the name was briefly changed to "Leander", but was then changed back to "Pamelia". A small part of the town of Orleans was added to Pamelia in 1824. A small south part of Pamelia was lost when Watertown incorporated in 1869.

== Geography ==
According to the United States Census Bureau, the town has a total area of 35.2 square miles (91.2 km^{2}), of which 33.8 square miles (87.6 km^{2}) are land and 1.4 square miles (3.5 km^{2}), or 3.89%, are water.

Part of the south town line borders the city Watertown. The Black River flows westward along the southwestern edge of the town.

Interstate 81 is a major highway in the western part of Pamelia. New York State Route 37 is a north-south highway east of Interstate 81. New York State Route 342 is an east-west highway which crosses NY-37 at Pamelia Center. New York State Route 12 crosses the southwest part of the town. U.S. Route 11 crosses the south part of Pamelia.

== Demographics ==
Historical population
| Census | Pop. | Note | %± |
|---|---|---|---|
| 1820 | 1,342 | | — |
| 1830 | 2,263 | | 68.6% |
| 1840 | 2,104 | | −7.0% |
| 1850 | 2,528 | | 20.2% |
| 1860 | 2,789 | | 10.3% |
| 1870 | 1,292 | | −53.7% |
| 1880 | 1,143 | | −11.5% |
| 1890 | 1,104 | | −3.4% |
| 1900 | 1,031 | | −6.6% |
| 1910 | 976 | | −5.3% |
| 1920 | 988 | | 1.2% |
| 1930 | 979 | | −0.9% |
| 1940 | 855 | | −12.7% |
| 1950 | 992 | | 16.0% |
| 1960 | 1,414 | | 42.5% |
| 1970 | 1,894 | | 33.9% |
| 1980 | 2,417 | | 27.6% |
| 1990 | 2,811 | | 16.3% |
| 2000 | 2,897 | | 3.1% |
| 2010 | 3,160 | | 9.1% |
| 2016 (est.) | 3,007 | | −4.8% |
U.S. Decennial Census

As of the census of 2000, there were 2,897 people, 1,044 households, and 790 families residing in the town. The population density was 85.3 inhabitants per square mile (32.9/km^{2}). There were 1,144 housing units at an average density of 33.7 per square mile (13.0/km^{2}). The racial makeup of the town was 94.20% White, 1.52% African American, 0.66% Native American, 1.21% Asian, 0.03% Pacific Islander, 0.59% from other races, and 1.79% from two or more races. Hispanic or Latino of any race were 1.73% of the population.

There were 1,044 households, out of which 38.2% had children under the age of 18 living with them, 60.5% were married couples living together, 8.7% had a female householder with no husband present, and 24.3% were non-families. 19.0% of all households were made up of individuals, and 5.7% had someone living alone who was 65 years of age or older. The average household size was 2.75 and the average family size was 3.12.

In the town, the population was spread out, with 29.0% under the age of 18, 8.2% from 18 to 24, 29.9% from 25 to 44, 24.9% from 45 to 64, and 8.1% who were 65 years of age or older. The median age was 36 years. For every 100 females, there were 103.7 males. For every 100 females age 18 and over, there were 100.5 males.

The median income for a household in the town was $37,500, and the median income for a family was $45,500. Males had a median income of $33,050 versus $21,832 for females. The per capita income for the town was $16,314. About 9.0% of families and 11.9% of the population were below the poverty line, including 17.1% of those under age 18 and 1.7% of those age 65 or over.

== Communities and locations in Pamelia ==
- Glen Park – A village primarily in the town of Brownville; a small portion occupies the southwestern corner of Pamelia.
- Knowlesville – A hamlet by Interstate 81 north of Pamelia Center.
- Pamelia Center (formerly "Williamsville") – A hamlet and census-designated place near the middle of the town on NY-37.
- Pamelia Four Corners – A hamlet by the eastern town line on NY-37 and County Road 16.
- Perch Lake – A lake partly in the northern part of Pamelia.
- Perch River – A stream partly in the northern part of the town.
- Scoville Corners – A location near the western town line at NY-12 and NY-342.

== Notable person ==
- Frank Leach, Wisconsin State Assemblyman and businessman, was born in Pamelia.
