= List of highways numbered 778 =

The following highways are numbered 778:

== United States ==
- LA 778
- MD 778
- SR 778
- PR-778
- FM 778
- SR 778

| Preceded by 777 | Lists of highways 778 | Succeeded by 779 |
