= Evans Mills, New York =

- Village
- Location within New York Location within the United States
- Coordinates: 44°5′19″N 75°48′26″W
- Country: United States
- State: New York
- County: Jefferson
- Town: Le Ray

Area
  - Total: 0.82 sq mi (2.12 km^{2})
  - Land: 0.82 sq mi (2.12 km^{2})
  - Water: 0 sq mi (0.00 km^{2})
- Elevation: 423 ft (129 m)

Population (2020)
  - Total: 678
  - Density: 830/sq mi (320.5/km^{2})
- Time zone: UTC-5 (Eastern (EST))
  - Summer (DST): UTC-4 (EDT)
- ZIP code: 13637
- Area code: 315
- FIPS code: 36-24823
- GNIS feature ID: 0949734
- Website: www.villageofevansmills.gov

Evans Mills is a village in Jefferson County, New York, United States. As of the 2020 census, Evans Mills had a population of 678. The village is within the town of Le Ray and is northeast of Watertown.

== History ==
The village was founded around 1802, but the mills were not erected until 1806. In the middle of the 19th century, the community was briefly called "Evansville". It was named for Ethni Evans, a mill owner.

Evans Mills became an incorporated village in 1874. Its population was then about 500.

The LeRay Hotel, circa 1828, was listed on the National Register of Historic Places in 1982.

The town is the home of Evans Mills Speedway which was built in 1967.

== Geography ==
Evans Mills is located northeast of the center of Jefferson County at 44°5′19″N 75°48′26″W (44.088555, -75.807193). It sits near the geographic center of the town of Le Ray, in the valley of West Creek, a northeastward-flowing tributary of the Indian River.

According to the United States Census Bureau, the village has a total area of 0.81 square miles (2.1 km^{2}), all land.

Evans Mills is near the west side of Fort Drum. It is located on County Road 16 (Willow Street). U.S. Route 11 passes through the southern side of the village, leading southwest 10 miles (16 km) to Watertown, the county seat, and northeast 7 miles (11 km) to the village of Philadelphia.

== Demographics ==
Historical population
Census	Pop.	Note	%±
1880	578		—
1930	514		—
1940	523		1.8%
1950	518		−1.0%
1960	618		19.3%
1970	714		15.5%
1980	651		−8.8%
1990	661		1.5%
2000	605		−8.5%
2010	621		2.6%
2020	678		9.2%
U.S. Decennial Census

As of the census of 2000, there were 605 people, 251 households, and 163 families residing in the village. The population density was 768.8 inhabitants per square mile (296.8/km^{2}). There were 276 housing units at an average density of 350.7 per square mile (135.4/km^{2}). The racial makeup of the village was 94.05% White, 2.48% African American, 0.33% Native American, 1.49% Asian, and 1.65% from two or more races. Hispanic or Latino of any race were 0.66% of the population.

There were 251 households, out of which 29.1% had children under the age of 18 living with them, 50.6% were married couples living together, 10.8% had a female householder with no husband present, and 34.7% were non-families. 29.5% of all households were made up of individuals, and 16.3% had someone living alone who was 65 years of age or older. The average household size was 2.41 and the average family size was 2.95.

In the village, the population was spread out, with 24.0% under the age of 18, 9.8% from 18 to 24, 24.6% from 25 to 44, 25.1% from 45 to 64, and 16.5% who were 65 years of age or older. The median age was 37 years. For every 100 females, there were 95.2 males. For every 100 females age 18 and over, there were 88.5 males.

The median income for a household in the village was $40,750, and the median income for a family was $44,886. Males had a median income of $33,281 versus $21,641 for females. The per capita income for the village was $18,358. About 12.4% of families and 13.4% of the population were below the poverty line, including 21.9% of those under age 18 and 14.9% of those age 65 or over.

== Education ==
The school district is the Indian River Central School District.
