= Black River, New York =

- Village
- Location within New York Location within the United States
- Coordinates: 44°0′42″N 75°47′41″W
- Country: United States
- State: New York
- County: Jefferson
- Towns: Le Ray, Rutland

Area
  - Total: 1.88 sq mi (4.88 km^{2})
  - Land: 1.78 sq mi (4.61 km^{2})
  - Water: 0.10 sq mi (0.27 km^{2})
- Elevation: 571 ft (174 m)

Population (2020)
  - Total: 1,232
  - Density: 691.6/sq mi (267.03/km^{2})
- Time zone: UTC-5 (Eastern (EST))
  - Summer (DST): UTC-4 (EDT)
- ZIP Codes: 13612 (Black River); 13601 (Watertown)
- Area code: 315
- FIPS code: 36-06794
- GNIS feature ID: 0944178
- Website: www.blackriverny.gov

Black River is a village in Jefferson County, New York, United States. As of the 2020 census, Black River had a population of 1,232. The village is on the border of the towns of Le Ray and Rutland, east of Watertown.

== History ==
The area was first settled around 1806 by the erection of a mill on the south side of the Black River. The village was previously called "Lockport", and grew to include both sides of the river as well as two small river islands.

On February 20, 1890, a large fire destroyed the business section of the downtown. Buildings destroyed by the fire included the Poor Block (which included a three-story building with an opera house on the third floor); the D.J. Scott and Son Block; the Arthur House (a hotel); Parkinson's Store (the old 1881 post office); Whipple and Hadsell's Store; F.H. Dillenbeck's Tinshop and Hardware Store; A.W. McDowell's Store; George Graham's barber shop; the I.O.O.F. Hall and two residential dwellings. The Kennedy Stone house was badly burned, but was later restored. Having no fire department at the time, the residents of Black River immediately made plans to organize a fire department later that year. Black River Fire Company No. 1 was organized September 4, 1890, and incorporated on January 3, 1891. The department was re-incorporated as the Black River Fire Department on February 21, 1940. This department still provides fire protection for the village, and is one of the oldest continually operating fire departments in Jefferson County.

The community incorporated as a village in 1891, taking land in the towns of Rutland and Le Ray.

The LeRay Mansion was listed on the National Register of Historic Places in 1974.

== Geography ==
The village of Black River is located in east-central Jefferson County at 44°0′42″N 75°47′41″W (44.011567, -75.794773). According to the United States Census Bureau, it has a total area of 1.85 square miles (4.78 km^{2}), of which 1.79 square miles (4.64 km^{2}) are land and 0.054 square miles (0.14 km^{2}), or 2.88%, are water.

The Black River flows through the center of the village and forms the border between the towns of Le Ray and Rutland.

New York State Route 3 (Rutland Street) passes through the south side of the village and intersects New York State Route 342 west of the village. NY-3 leads west 6 miles (10 km) (downriver) to the center of Watertown and east 12 miles (19 km) (upriver) to Carthage. NY 342 leads northwest 7 miles (11 km) to Interstate 81 north of Watertown.

=== Climate ===
Climate data for Black river, New York (Precipitation only 2011-2022)
Month	Jan	Feb	Mar	Apr	May	Jun	Jul	Aug	Sep	Oct	Nov	Dec	Year
Average precipitation inches (mm)	3.52 (89)	3.29 (84)	2.49 (63)	3.86 (98)	3.95 (100)	4.14 (105)	3.16 (80)	4.00 (102)	3.42 (87)	5.33 (135)	4.01 (102)	4.18 (106)	45.35 (1,151)
Average snowfall inches (cm)	35.7 (91)	29.7 (75)	8.2 (21)	0.2 (0.51)	0.1 (0.25)	0.0 (0.0)	0.0 (0.0)	0.0 (0.0)	0.0 (0.0)	0.0 (0.0)	4.6 (12)	17.6 (45)	96.1 (244.76)
Average precipitation days (≥ 0.01 Inches)	15	15	12	15	14	12	11	12	12	16	14	16	164
Average snowy days (≥ 0.1 inches)	8	9	4	0	0	0	0	0	0	0	2	5	28
Source: National Weather Service

== Demographics ==
Historical population
Census	Pop.	Note	%±
1860	250		—
1870	181		−27.6%
1880	195		7.7%
1900	949		—
1910	916		−3.5%
1920	937		2.3%
1930	928		−1.0%
1940	897		−3.3%
1950	1,062		18.4%
1960	1,237		16.5%
1970	1,307		5.7%
1980	1,384		5.9%
1990	1,349		−2.5%
2000	1,285		−4.7%
2010	1,348		4.9%
2020	1,232		−8.6%
U.S. Decennial Census

As of the census of 2000, there were 1,285 people, 521 households, and 373 families residing in the village. The population density was 709.8 inhabitants per square mile (274.1/km^{2}). There were 556 housing units at an average density of 307.1 per square mile (118.6/km^{2}). The racial makeup of the village was 91.98% White, 2.65% African American, 0.47% Native American, 2.72% Asian, 0.54% from other races, and 1.63% from two or more races. Hispanic or Latino of any race were 1.32% of the population.

There were 521 households, out of which 32.2% had children under the age of 18 living with them, 56.4% were married couples living together, 11.7% had a female householder with no husband present, and 28.4% were non-families. 23.4% of all households were made up of individuals, and 10.2% had someone living alone who was 65 years of age or older. The average household size was 2.47 and the average family size was 2.89.

In the village, the population was spread out, with 25.9% under the age of 18, 6.8% from 18 to 24, 30.7% from 25 to 44, 22.8% from 45 to 64, and 13.8% who were 65 years of age or older. The median age was 37 years. For every 100 females, there were 91.8 males. For every 100 females age 18 and over, there were 87.8 males.

The median income for a household in the village was $45,761, and the median income for a family was $54,236. Males had a median income of $36,058 versus $26,458 for females. The per capita income for the village was $20,524. About 3.0% of families and 6.1% of the population were below the poverty line, including 5.4% of those under age 18 and 6.8% of those age 65 or over.
