= Gouverneur (village), New York =

Gouverneur
- Village
- Village of Gouverneur
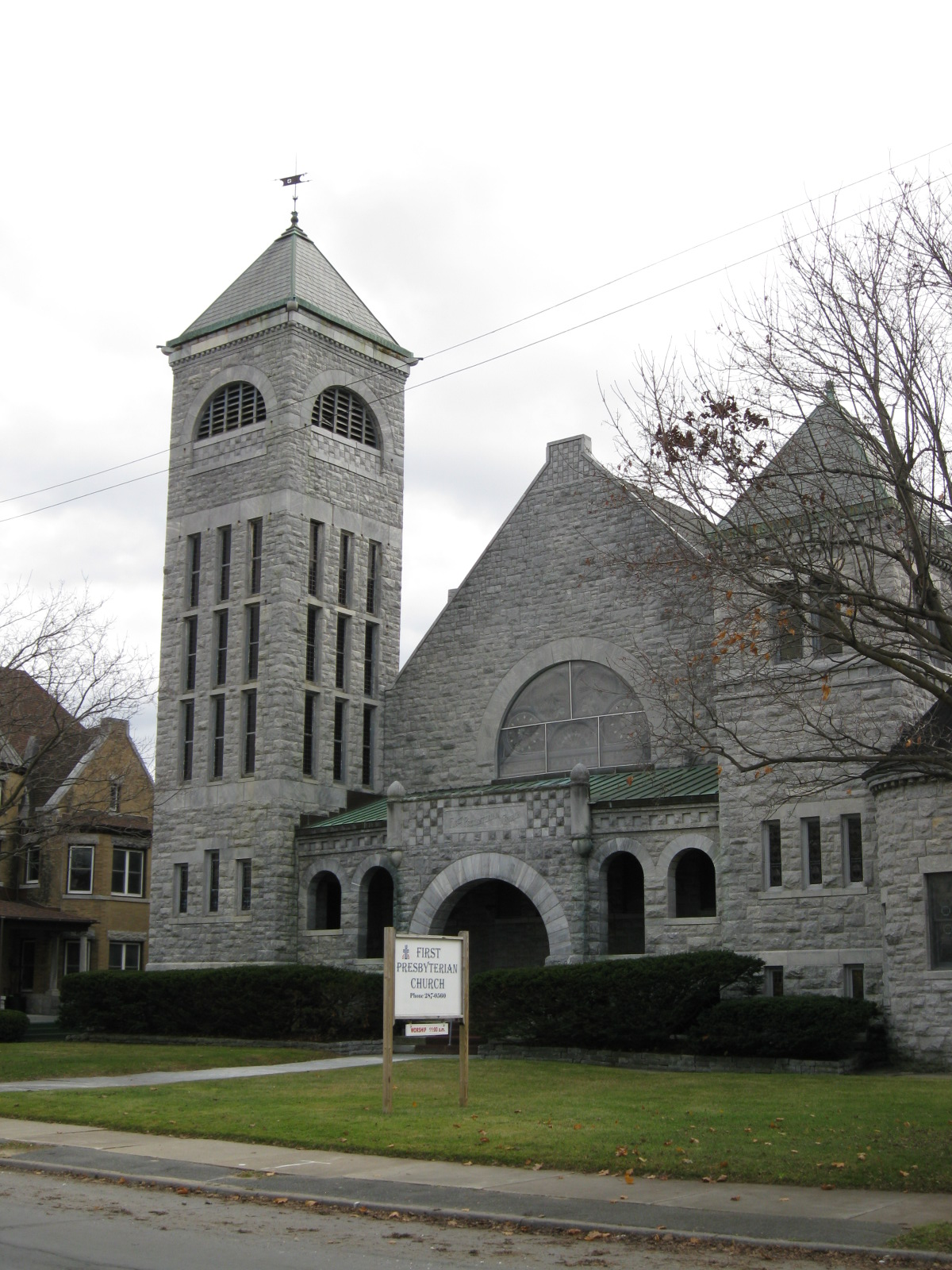
- First Presbyterian Church in downtown Gouverneur.

- Location within the state of New York
- Coordinates: 44°20′4″N 75°27′59″W
- Country: United States
- State: New York
- County: St. Lawrence
- Named for: Gouverneur Morris

Area
  - Total: 2.2 sq mi (5.7 km^{2})
  - Land: 2.1 sq mi (5.5 km^{2})
  - Water: 0.077 sq mi (0.2 km^{2})
- Elevation: 440 ft (134 m)

Population (2020)
  - Total: 3,526
- Time zone: UTC-5 (Eastern (EST))
  - Summer (DST): UTC-4 (EDT)
- FIPS code: 36-29597
- GNIS feature ID: 0976353
- Website: https://www.villageofgouverneurny.gov/

Gouverneur is a village in St. Lawrence County, New York, United States. The population was 3,949 at the 2010 census. The village is named after Gouverneur Morris, one of the authors of the Constitution of the United States, as well as a prominent landowner and part-time resident of the area.

The Village of Gouverneur is in the Town of Gouverneur in the southeastern part of both the town and the county.

The community is called the "Marble Village" because of the many structures made from marble and the importance of marble in the early economy.

== History ==
Gouverneur Morris, his relative Samuel Ogden, and partner William Constable were all early landowners in northern New York, and Morris established a summer home in the town. Mining the local marble was one of the first big industries in the area. Later, mining talc and zinc became important.

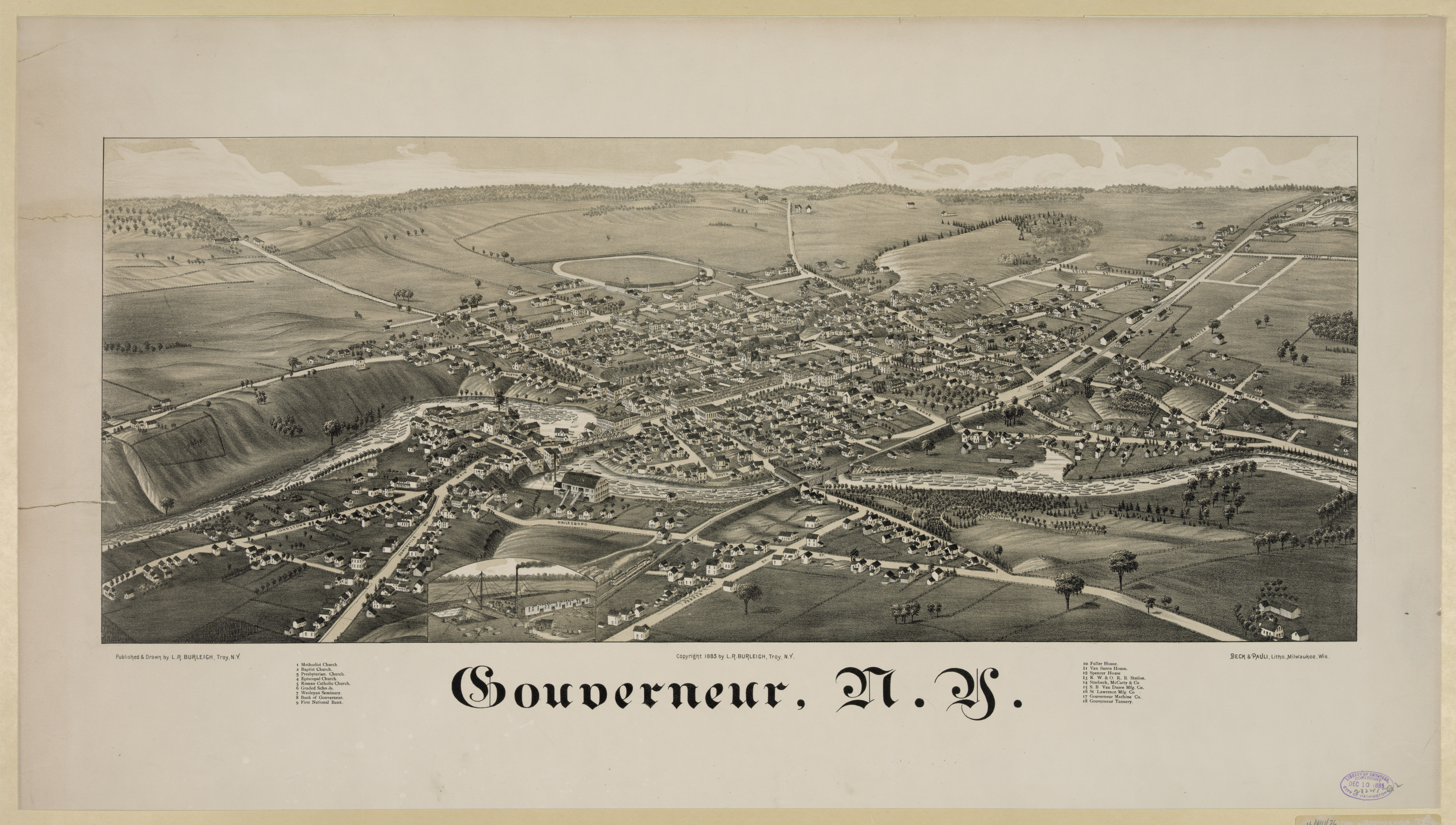
Lithograph of Gouverneur from 1885 by L.R. Burleigh with list of landmarks

The Village of Gouverneur was incorporated in 1850.

The First Presbyterian Church Complex was listed on the National Register of Historic Places in 2015.

== Geography ==
According to the United States Census Bureau, the village has a total area of 2.2 square miles (5.7 km^{2}), of which 2.1 square miles (5.5 km^{2}) are land and 0.1 square mile (0.2 km^{2}) (2.74%) is water.

U.S. Route 11 passes through the village, where it converges with New York State Route 58 and New York State Route 812. County Road 11 leads into the village from the north, and County Road 12 leads in from the west.

The Oswegatchie River flows westward through the village.

== Demographics ==
Historical population
| Census | Pop. | Note | %± |
|---|---|---|---|
| 1870 | 1,627 | | — |
| 1880 | 2,071 | | 27.3% |
| 1890 | 3,458 | | 67.0% |
| 1900 | 3,689 | | 6.7% |
| 1910 | 4,128 | | 11.9% |
| 1920 | 4,143 | | 0.4% |
| 1930 | 4,015 | | −3.1% |
| 1940 | 4,478 | | 11.5% |
| 1950 | 4,916 | | 9.8% |
| 1960 | 4,946 | | 0.6% |
| 1970 | 4,574 | | −7.5% |
| 1980 | 4,285 | | −6.3% |
| 1990 | 4,604 | | 7.4% |
| 2000 | 4,263 | | −7.4% |
| 2010 | 3,949 | | −7.4% |
| 2020 | 3,526 | | −10.7% |
U.S. Decennial Census

As of the census of 2000, there were 4,263 people, 1,667 households, and 1,093 families residing in the village. The population density was 2,004.4 inhabitants per square mile (773.9/km^{2}). There were 1,815 housing units at an average density of 853.4 per square mile (329.5/km^{2}). The racial makeup of the village was 94.39% White, 1.78% Black or African American, 0.38% Native American, 0.40% Asian, 0.23% Pacific Islander, 1.06% from other races, and 1.76% from two or more races. Hispanic or Latino of any race were 2.28% of the population.

There were 1,667 households, out of which 36.3% had children under the age of 18 living with them, 47.6% were married couples living together, 13.9% had a female householder with no husband present, and 34.4% were non-families. 29.2% of all households were made up of individuals, and 15.2% had someone living alone who was 65 years of age or older. The average household size was 2.52 and the average family size was 3.09.

In the village, the population was spread out, with 29.8% under the age of 18, 9.5% from 18 to 24, 27.3% from 25 to 44, 19.7% from 45 to 64, and 13.7% who were 65 years of age or older. The median age was 33 years. For every 100 females, there were 90.6 males. For every 100 females age 18 and over, there were 82.9 males.

The median income for a household in the village was $25,174, and the median income for a family was $29,192. Males had a median income of $31,768 versus $20,064 for females. The per capita income for the village was $12,482. About 17.6% of families and 18.3% of the population were below the poverty line, including 22.6% of those under age 18 and 10.2% of those age 65 or over.

== Education ==
The village is in the Gouverneur Central School District.

== Notable residents ==
- Edward J. Noble (1882–1958), founder of the American Broadcasting Company
- Thomas Pangle, author and holder of the Joe R. Long Chair in Democratic Studies at the University of Texas at Austin
- Brian Leonard, former American football player for the Tampa Bay Buccaneers and Cincinnati Bengals of the NFL
