= Le Ray, New York =

- Town
- Location within New York Location within the United States
- Coordinates: 44°4′34″N 75°48′32″W
- Country: United States
- State: New York
- County: Jefferson
- Named after: Jacques-Donatien Le Ray, Comte de Chaumont

Government
  - Type: Town Council
  - Town Supervisor: Ronald C. Taylor (R)
  - Town Council: Members' List: • William R. Jesmore (R); • Mark W. Thompson (R); • Michael J. Gracey (R); • Karl J. Vebber (R)

Area
  - Total: 73.98 sq mi (191.61 km^{2})
  - Land: 73.61 sq mi (190.64 km^{2})
  - Water: 0.37 sq mi (0.97 km^{2})
- Elevation: 460 ft (140 m)

Population (2020)
  - Total: 25,574
  - Density: 294.7/sq mi (113.79/km^{2})
- Time zone: UTC-5 (Eastern (EST))
  - Summer (DST): UTC-4 (EDT)
- ZIP Codes: 13602, 13603 (Fort Drum); 13637 (Evans Mills); 13612 (Black River); 13616 (Calcium); 13601 (Watertown); 13673 (Philadelphia); 13691 (Theresa)
- Area code: 315
- FIPS code: 36-045-42015
- GNIS feature ID: 0979141
- Website: www.townofleray.org

Le Ray is a town in Jefferson County, New York, United States. The population was 25,574 at the 2020 census, up from 21,782 in 2010. The town is named for Jacques-Donatien Le Ray de Chaumont, Count de Chaumont, known as a French "father of the American Revolution".

The town is in the central part of the county and is northeast of Watertown. Fort Drum is within the town.

== History ==
Archaeological remains show the presence of aboriginal natives in the town.

The region was part of Macomb's Purchase and was acquired by Gouverneur Morris and James Le Ray in 1800. Settlement began around 1802.

The town was formed in 1806 from the town of Brownville and included a large portion of northern Jefferson County. Parts of the town were used to create the towns of Wilna, Alexandria, Theresa, Antwerp, and Philadelphia.

Many of the historic settlements of the town were abandoned due to the formation of Fort Drum, which occupies the eastern half of the town.

The LeRaysville Archeological District was listed on the National Register of Historic Places in 1995.

Le Ray, NY was named as one of the worst towns to reside in America. It was named in an article circa 2026. Source: https://nypost.com/2026/09/07/lifestyle/new-york-town-le-ray-named-one-of-americas-worst-places-to-live/

== Geography ==
According to the United States Census Bureau, the town has a total area of 74.0 square miles (191.7 km^{2}), of which 190.7 square miles (494 km^{2}) are land and 0.3 square miles (0.9 km^{2}), or 0.49%, are water. The Black River marks the south town border.

U.S. Route 11 is a northeast–southwest highway through Le Ray. New York State Route 3 passes across the southeastern part of Le Ray. New York State Route 26 is a north–south highway. New York State Route 37 is a north–south highway in the western part of Le Ray. New York State Route 342 crosses the southern part of the town.

== Demographics ==
Historical population
Census	Pop.	Note	%±
1820	2,944		—
1830	3,430		16.5%
1840	3,721		8.5%
1850	3,654		−1.8%
1860	3,159		−13.5%
1870	2,862		−9.4%
1880	2,660		−7.1%
1890	2,565		−3.6%
1900	2,576		0.4%
1910	2,555		−0.8%
1920	2,366		−7.4%
1930	2,422		2.4%
1940	2,551		5.3%
1950	2,821		10.6%
1960	3,627		28.6%
1970	3,973		9.5%
1980	5,039		26.8%
1990	17,973		256.7%
2000	19,840		10.4%
2010	21,782		9.8%
2020	25,574		17.4%
U.S. Decennial Census

As of the census of 2000, there were 19,836 people, 4,998 households, and 4,303 families residing in the town. The population density was 269.1 inhabitants per square mile (103.9/km^{2}). There were 5,245 housing units at an average density of 71.2/sq mi (27.5/km^{2}). The racial makeup of the town was 70.48% White, 16.36% African American, 0.79% Native American, 2.06% Asian, 0.49% Pacific Islander, 6.09% from other races, and 3.73% from two or more races. Hispanic or Latino of any race were 10.94% of the population.

There were 4,998 households, out of which 58.9% had children under the age of 18 living with them, 76.0% were married couples living together, 7.3% had a female householder with no husband present, and 13.9% were non-families. 10.9% of all households were made up of individuals, and 3.2% had someone living alone who was 65 years of age or older. The average household size was 3.04 and the average family size was 3.28.

In the town, the population was spread out, with 27.8% under the age of 18, 27.9% from 18 to 24, 34.7% from 25 to 44, 6.8% from 45 to 64, and 2.7% who were 65 years of age or older. The median age was 23 years. For every 100 females, there were 145.9 males. For every 100 females age 18 and over, there were 167.5 males.

The median income for a household in the town was $33,359, and the median income for a family was $33,806. Males had a median income of $21,541 versus $21,074 for females. The per capita income for the town was $14,140. About 7.8% of families and 9.1% of the population were below the poverty line, including 10.1% of those under age 18 and 8.8% of those age 65 or over.

== Communities and locations in Le Ray ==
- Black River – A village on the southern town line along the Black River.
- Calcium – A hamlet and census-designated place west of Fort Drum.
- Doolins Crossing – A location by the eastern corner of the town.
- Dutch Settlement – A hamlet in the northern part of the town on County Road 18.
- Evans Mills – A village in the center of the town on the western side of Fort Drum, north of US-11.
- Five Corners – A location in the southwestern part of Le Ray.
- Fort Drum – Part of the military reservation occupies the eastern half of the town.
- Gould Corners – A location southeast of Evans Mills, located on US-11.
- Gracey Corners – A location in the southwest of Le Ray.
- Hall Corners – A location near the northeastern town line.
- Pine Plains – A location near the eastern corner of the town.
- Westwood Corners – A location on US-11 near the northeastern town line.
