= Fort Drum =

- Jefferson County, New York; Near Watertown
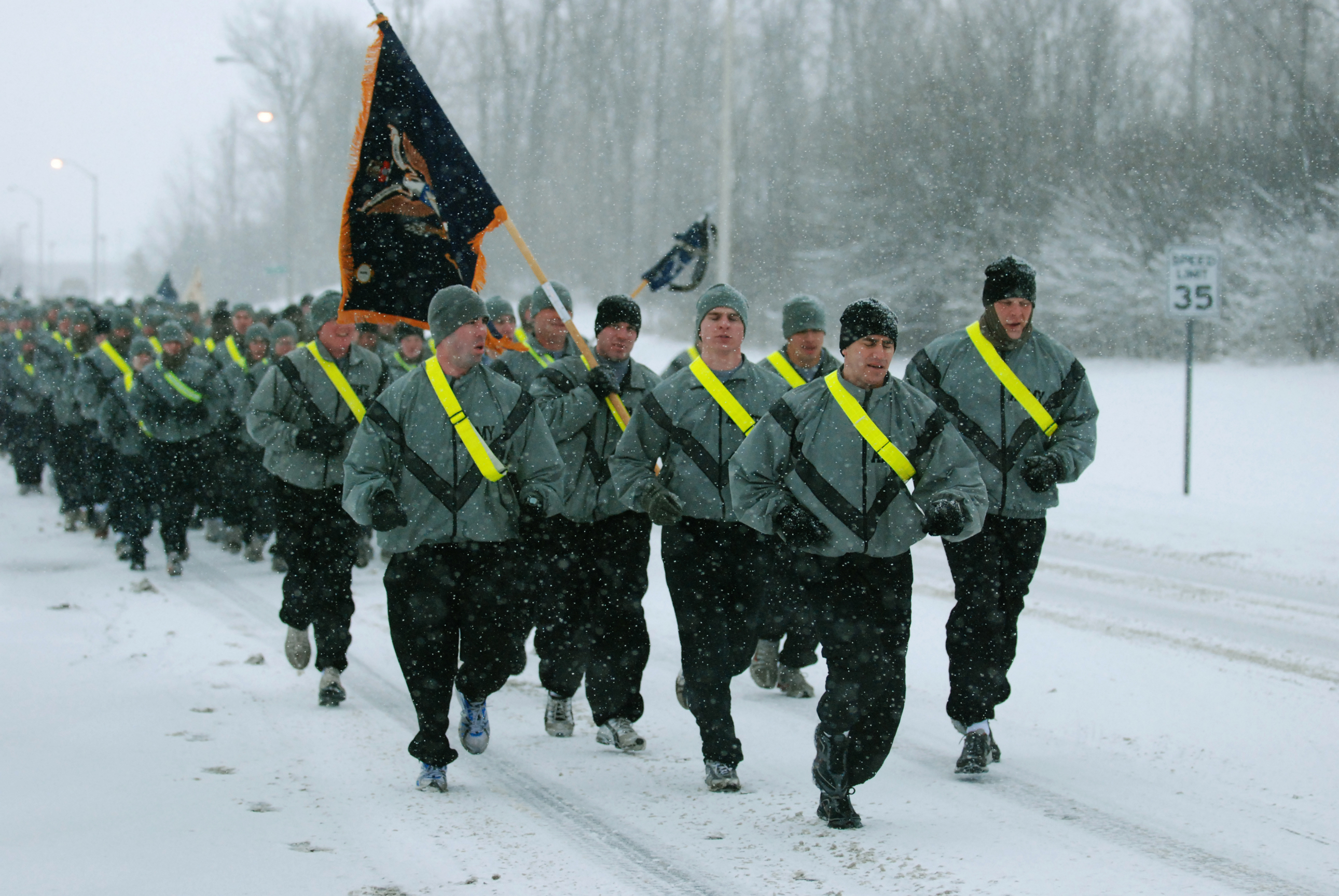
- 1st Battalion, 87th Infantry Regiment, on a run

Site information
- Owner: U.S. Army
- Controlled by: 10th Mountain Division
- Website: www.army.mil/drum

Location
- Area: 107,265 acres (434.09 km^{2})

Site history
- Built: 1908
- In use: 1908–present

Fort Drum, New York
- Census-designated place
- Location within New York Location within the United States
- Coordinates: 44°3′15″N 75°47′13″W
- Country: United States
- State: New York
- County: Jefferson
- Town: Le Ray

Area
  - Total: 14.45 sq mi (37.43 km^{2})
  - Land: 14.34 sq mi (37.14 km^{2})
  - Water: 0.11 sq mi (0.29 km^{2})
- Elevation: 590 ft (180 m)

Population (2020)
  - Total: 15,896
  - Density: 1,108.5/sq mi (428.01/km^{2})
- Time zone: UTC−5 (Eastern (EST))
  - Summer (DST): UTC−4 (EDT)
- ZIP Codes: 13602–13603
- Area code: 315
- FIPS code: 36-26759

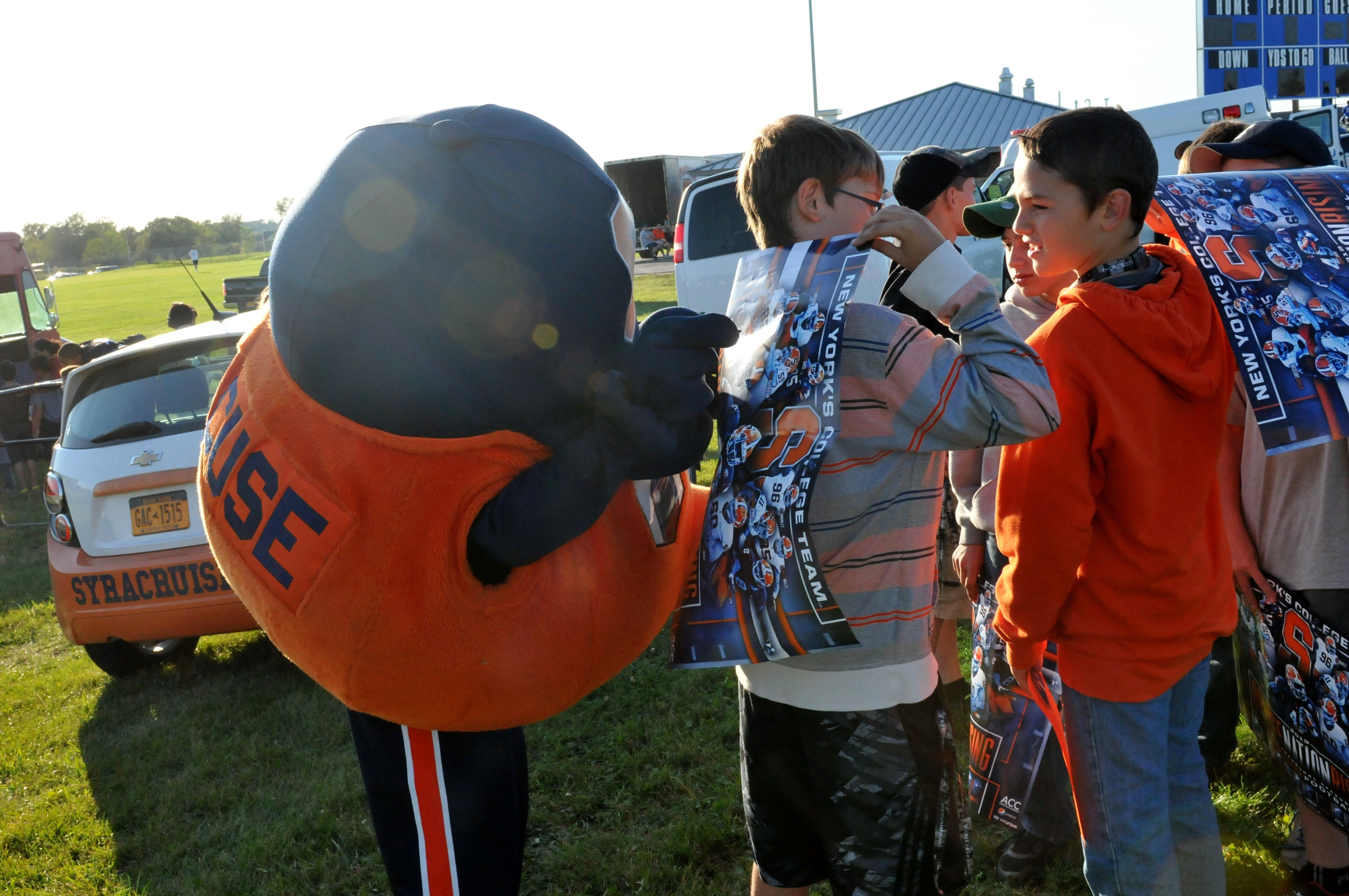
10th Mountain Division soldiers and their families catch Syracuse University scrimmage football game at Sligh field (2013)

Fort Drum is a U.S. Army military reservation and a census-designated place (CDP) in Jefferson County, near the western border of northern New York, United States. The population of the CDP portion of the base was 12,955 at the 2010 census. It is home to the 10th Mountain Division.

Fort Drum consists of 107,265 acres (434.09 km^{2}). In the region, winter temperatures can reach as low as −30 °F (−34 °C). Its mission includes command of active component units assigned to the installation, providing administrative and logistical support to tenant units, support to active and reserve units from all services in training at Fort Drum, and planning and support for the mobilization and training of almost 80,000 troops annually.

== History ==
This section of the article incorporates text taken from a public-domain document prepared by the United States military.

A portion of the present Fort Drum was first used as a military training site in 1908 when it was named Pine Camp; the following year land was purchased to develop the camp as an installation. The army had an earlier presence in the North Country from the early 19th century, prior to the War of 1812.

In 1809 the United States stationed a company of infantry soldiers at what was then called Sackett's Harbor to enforce the Embargo Act and control smuggling between northern New York and Canada, particularly Kingston, Ontario. Following the outbreak of the War of 1812, Sacketts Harbor became the center of United States naval and military activity for the Upper St. Lawrence River valley and Lake Ontario. A major shipyard was developed there and twelve warships were completed. The town was rapidly flooded with troops and some 3,000 skilled workers for the navy shipyard, most of whom came from New York City.

During the 1830s and 1840s, the Lower Canada Rebellion in Canada prompted a new round of military preparations. The United States purchased land in Sackets Harbor (as it is now spelled), where it developed Madison Barracks, a base for artillery units.

=== Pine Camp ===
In 1908, Major General Frederick Dent Grant was sent to the Pine Camp region to train with 2,000 regulars and 8,000 militia. Grant, the son of Ulysses S. Grant, former United States president and Civil War general, found Pine Plains to be ideal for military exercises. In 1909 the military allocated funds to purchase land to form Pine Camp, and summer training continued here through the years.

The camp came into the national spotlight in 1935, when the largest peacetime maneuvers in American military history up to that point were held on the Pine Plains and surrounding farmland. Approximately 36,500 soldiers came from throughout the Northeast to take part in the exercise. Some soldiers traveled by trains, which arrived in town every 15 minutes, coming from as far away as Buffalo, New York and New York City. For 36 hours, young men from offices, factories, and farms marched, attacked and defended in tactical exercises on the 100 square miles (260 km^{2}) the Army had leased for its war games. The maneuvers were judged to be a success, and the War Department purchased an additional 9,000 acres (3,600 ha) of land.

==== LeRay Mansion ====
The LeRay Mansion, built in the early 19th century, was named after James LeRay de Chaumont. Throughout the years the mansion served as a post commander's quarters, visiting dignitaries' quarters and a location for formal military receptions. Today the mansion is used to house high ranking visitors, which has encouraged the continued upkeep of the mansion. The LeRay Mansion is listed on the National Register of Historic Places.

==== World War II expansion ====
With the outbreak of World War II in Europe, Pine Camp was selected by the Army for a major expansion. An additional 75,000 acres (30,000 ha) of land was purchased, displacing 525 local families. Five entire villages were eliminated, while others were reduced from one-third to one-half their size. Three thousand buildings, including 24 schools, six churches and a post office, were abandoned.

By Labor Day 1941, 100 tracts of land were taken over. Contractors went to work, and in a period of 10 months at a cost of $20 million, an entire city was built to house the divisions scheduled to train at Pine Camp.

Eight hundred buildings were constructed, including 240 barracks, 84 mess halls, 86 storehouses, 58 warehouses, 27 officers' quarters, 22 headquarters buildings, and 99 recreational buildings, as well as guardhouses and a hospital. Construction workers suffered during this period, as the winter of 1941-42 was one of the coldest in North Country history.

The three divisions to train at Pine Camp included the 4th Armored Division (Gen. Creighton Abrams was a battalion commander there at the time), the 45th Infantry Division (United States), and the 5th Armored Division.

During the war, the post also served as a prisoner of war camp for captured Italian and German troops. Some were allowed to work on area farms during their internment. Of prisoners who died here, one Italian and six Germans are buried in the Sheepfold Cemetery near Remington Pond.

Pine Camp was renamed as Camp Drum in 1951, named after Lieutenant General Hugh A. Drum, who was chief of staff of the First United States Army during World War I and First Army commander at the start of World War II. During and after the Korean War, a number of units were stationed and trained here to take advantage of the terrain and climate.

In 1959, testing of Agent Orange began on more than 1,000 acres (405 ha) of Camp Drum. Several communities at or near Agent Orange manufacturing or storage sites continue to report dioxin levels above recommended safety standards, including Fort Drum. The material was used extensively during the Vietnam War for defoliation.

=== Renamed Fort Drum and after ===
In 1974, a permanent garrison was assigned and Camp Drum was renamed Fort Drum. In April 1980, B Company, 76th Engineer Battalion (Combat Heavy) was reassigned from Fort Meade, Maryland. Three years later the rest of the battalion was transferred here, with the exception of D Company.

On 11 September 1984, the announcement was made that Fort Drum would be the new home of the 10th Light Infantry Division. Its mission is to be operationally ready and trained to deploy rapidly by air, sea, and land anywhere in the world, prepared to fight upon arrival and win. The first of the division's troops arrived at Fort Drum on 3 December 1984, and the unit was officially activated on 13 February 1985. The name was changed to the 10th Mountain Division (Light Infantry) at that time. The division reached full strength in 1989.

Between 1986 and 1992, 130 new buildings, 35 miles (56 km) of roads, and 4,272 sets of family quarters were built at a cost of $1.3 billion.

On 4 June 1985, the identity of a roundout brigade was announced that would be composed of Army National Guard battalions. Units from the New York Army National Guard from central and northern New York under the 27th Infantry Brigade made the roundout brigade.

On 28 June 1985, the 76th Engineer Battalion was inactivated.

In 2013 Fort Drum was being considered for the location of a proposed Eastern United States missile defense site.

In 2014, a 60-megawatt biofuel power plant was established to provide energy for the base, part of the U.S. military's push for renewable energy and self-sufficiency.

In 2015, Diana M. Holland was promoted to become the first woman general at Fort Drum, and the first woman to serve as a deputy commanding general in one of the Army's light infantry divisions (specifically, the 10th Mountain Division).

=== Current units ===
- 10th Mountain Division
- 1st Brigade Combat Team, 10th Mountain Division
- 2nd Brigade Combat Team, 10th Mountain Division
- Combat Aviation Brigade, 10th Mountain Division
- 10th Mountain Division Artillery, 10th Mountain Division
- 10th Mountain Division Sustainment Brigade
- American Red Cross (ARC)
- U.S. Army Materiel Command FSC (LAO)
- Wheeler-Sack Army Airfield
- 20th Air Support Operations Squadron (United States Air Force)
- Air Force Weather, 20th Air Support Operations Squadron (20th ASOS)
- Fort Drum Criminal Investigation Command (CID)
- Non-commissioned Officers Academy
- Naval Reserve Center - Fort Drum
- 1st Battalion (Infantry), 314th Regiment; 2d Battalion (Logistics Support), 313th Regiment; and 3d Battalion (Field Artillery), 314th Regiment (all under the 174th Infantry Brigade, previously known as 2d Brigade, 78th Division Training Support, now stationed at Fort Dix)
- 7th Legal Support Organization (7th LSO)
- 725th Ordnance Company (EOD)
- 174th Fighter Wing Air-Ground Gunnery Range
- 1215th Garrison Support Unit (USAR)
- Guthrie Ambulatory Health Care Clinic
- U.S. Air Ambulance Detachment
- 760th Ordnance Company (EOD)
- 63d Ordnance Battalion (EOD)
- 91st Military Police Battalion
- 7th Engineer Battalion
- 630th Engineer Company (Route Clearance)
- 642d Engineer Company (Support)
- Company B (Field Maintenance), 427th Brigade Support Battalion, 27th Infantry Brigade Combat Team, New York Army National Guard (NYARNG);
- 1427th Transportation Company (Medium Truck), 53rd Troop Command, NYARNG;
- Company C, Recruiting and Retention Command, NYARNG;
- Maneuver Area Training Equipment Site (NY MATES), NYARNG.
- 925th Contracting Battalion.

== Geography ==
According to the United States Census Bureau, the CDP portion of Fort Drum has a total area of 14.42 square miles (37.35 km^{2}), of which 14.33 square miles (37.11 km^{2}) are land and 0.093 square miles (0.24 km^{2}), or 0.65%, are water.

The military reservation occupies a large tract in the eastern part of Jefferson County, including parts of the towns of Antwerp, Leray, Philadelphia, and Wilna. The reservation also extends east into the town of Diana in Lewis County. Several villages in Jefferson County are on the border of Fort Drum: Antwerp, Black River, Carthage, Evans Mills, Natural Bridge, and Philadelphia. The nearest city is Watertown, 13 miles (21 km) to the southwest, which is the service and shopping destination for the fort's personnel.

The Indian and Black rivers flow along part of the reservation boundary.

== Demographics ==
Historical population
Census	Pop.	Note	%±
2020	15,896		—
U.S. Decennial Census

As of the census of 2000, there were 12,123 people, 2,253 households, and 2,203 families residing in the CDP. The population density was 479.8 inhabitants per square mile (185.3/km^{2}). There were 2,280 housing units at an average density of 90.2 per square mile (34.8/km^{2}). The racial makeup of the CDP was 64.2% White, 19.8% African American, 0.8% Native American, 2.4% Asian, 0.7% Pacific Islander, 7.6% from other races, and 4.5% from two or more races. Hispanic or Latino of any race were 13.3% of the population.

There were 2,253 households, of which 75.3% had children under the age of 18 living with them, 91.9% were married couples living together, 4.3% had a female householder with no husband present, and 2.2% were non-families. Of all households, 2.0% were made up of individuals, and none had someone living alone who was 65 years of age or older. The average household size was 3.33 and the average family size was 3.36.

In the CDP, the population was spread out, with 24.9% under the age of 18, 37.5% from 18 to 24, 36.0% from 25 to 44, 1.5% from 45 to 64, and 0.1% who were 65 years of age or older. The median age was 22 years. For every 100 females, there were 186.9 males. For every 100 females age 18 and over, there were 235.4 males.

The median income for a household in the CDP was $31,699, and the median income for a family was $31,202. Males had a median income of $19,779 versus $19,401 for females. The per capita income for the CDP was $13,395. About 6.3% of families and 6.2% of the population were below the poverty line, including 6.8% of those under age 18 and none of those age 65 or over.

== Employment and housing ==
Fort Drum is made up of 107,265 acres (434 km^{2}). There are both on-post and off-post jobs and housing associated with the installation. Civilian job opportunities include day care providers, school teachers, nurses, and custodial workers. There is also a Teen-In-Hire program that helps teens in school obtain jobs.

While housing can be difficult to obtain on-post due to the number of families moving to the area, families are able to stay temporarily at the Fort Drum Inn, cottages, guest house, cabins, or the LeRay Mansion, which all are under the care of Fort Drum Lodging. Soldiers and/or their dependents may also stay at one of many hotels surrounding Fort Drum.

== Education ==
The Fort Drum CDP is divided between the Carthage Central School District and the Indian River Central School District. Some areas on Fort Drum are not within any school district. Fort Drum sends K-12 students in Richard Hills Housing Community to the Carthage school district, and residents of Adirondack Creek, Crescent Woods, and Monument Ridge housing to the Indian River district.

Area colleges and universities include:

- Jefferson Community College
