= List of county routes in Jefferson County, New York =

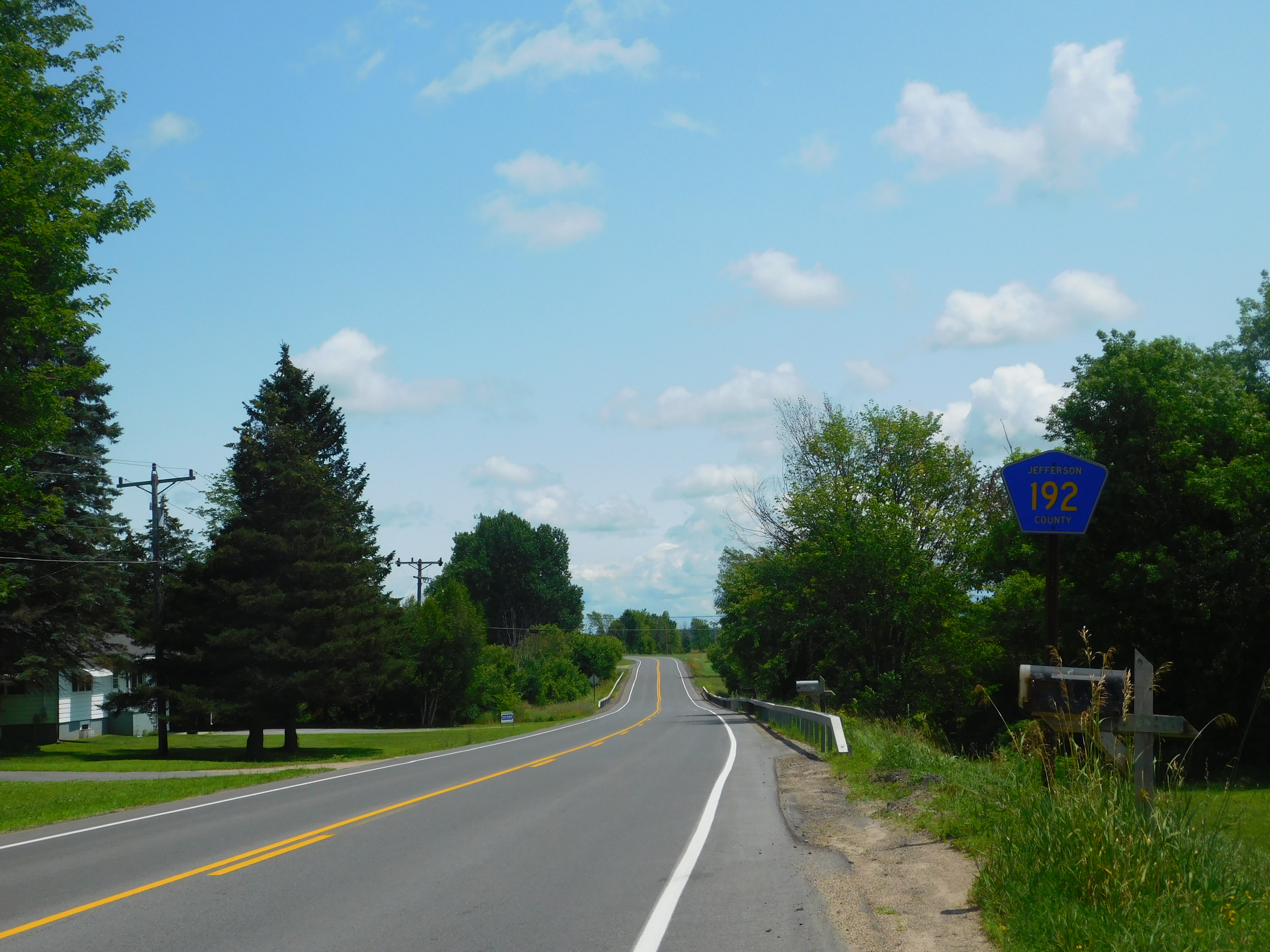
- CR 192 in Browns Corners, an example of signage in Jefferson County.

Highway names
- Interstates: Interstate X (I-X)
- US Highways: U.S. Route X (US X)
- State: New York State Route X (NY X)
- County: County Route X (CR X)

System links
- New York Highways; Interstate; US; State; Reference; Parkways

County routes in Jefferson County, New York, are signed with the Manual on Uniform Traffic Control Devices-standard yellow-on-blue pentagon route marker.

== Routes 1–100 ==
Route	Length (mi)	Length (km)	From	Via	To	Notes
CR 1 (1)	1.37	2.20	Alexandria Bay village line	Walton Street and Goose Bay Road in Alexandria	0.05 miles east of Dump Road	
CR 1 (2)	3.93	6.32	Limestone Road	Crooked Creek Road in Alexandria	CR 111	
CR 2	5.49	8.84	CR 3	Alexandria Center Road in Alexandria	NY 26	
CR 3	15.21	24.48	Clayton village line	East Line, Tanners Corners, and Plessis–Redwood roads	CR 192 in Alexandria	
CR 4	12.52	20.15	NY 12E in Cape Vincent	Rosiere and Crystal Springs roads	NY 12E in Clayton	
CR 5	14.41	23.19	NY 12E in Lyme	Three Mile Creek Road	CR 181 in Orleans	
CR 6	8.27	13.31	Dead end in Cape Vincent	Tibbets Point, Lighthouse, and Pleasant Valley roads	CR 57 in Lyme	
CR 7	1.21	1.95	NY 12E	Old State Road in Cape Vincent	NY 12E	Former number; transferred by August 2015.
CR 8	8.49	13.66	NY 12E in Cape Vincent	Millens Bay Road	NY 12E in Lyme	
CR 9	7.47	12.02	NY 12E in Cape Vincent	Sand Bay Road	NY 12 in Clayton	
CR 11	4.63	7.45	NY 12	Underbluff Road in Clayton	CR 5	
CR 12	5.09	8.19	NY 12 in Clayton	Overbluff Road	NY 180 in Orleans	
CR 13	5.44	8.75	NY 411 in Orleans	East Ridge Road	NY 180 in Orleans	
CR 15	10.48	16.87	Pink School House Road in Pamelia	Perch Lake and Jack Street roads	CR 3 in Alexandria	
CR 16	7.94	12.78	NY 12 in Brownville	Parish and Jenkins roads	Evans Mills village line in Le Ray	
CR 17	1.18	1.90	Pamelia town line	Kiser School House Road in Le Ray	NY 37	Former number; transferred by August 2015.
CR 18	2.83	4.55	CR 46 in Le Ray	Dutch Settlement Road	NY 37 in Theresa	
CR 20	3.72	5.99	CR 46 in Theresa	Kelsey Bridge Road	NY 26 in Philadelphia	
CR 21	7.47	12.02	CR 193 in Theresa village	English Settlement Road	Cottage Hill Road in Theresa	
CR 22	9.34	15.03	CR 194 in Theresa village	Oxbow and Vrooman Creek roads	CR 25 in Antwerp	
CR 24	5.88	9.46	US 11	Oxbow Road in Antwerp	CR 25	
CR 25	2.00	3.22	St. Lawrence County line (becomes CR 10)	Oxbow Road in Antwerp	St. Lawrence County line (becomes CR 12)	
CR 26	5.71	9.19	CR 194 in Antwerp village	Depot Street and Spragueville Road	St. Lawrence County line in Antwerp (becomes CR 9)	
CR 28	3.21	5.17	NY 26 in Philadelphia	Halls Corners Road	CR 194 in Antwerp	
CR 29	2.26	3.64	Fort Drum boundary	Plank Road in Philadelphia	US 11 / NY 26	
CR 30	9.41	15.14	NY 26 in Le Ray	Simonet, Gardnerville, and Webb roads	US 11 in Philadelphia	
CR 31	1.22	1.96	Watertown city line	Plaza Drive in Pamelia	US 11	
CR 32	7.90	12.71	US 11 in Pamelia	Bush Road, Goulds Corners Road, Patterson Road	US 11 in Pamelia	
CR 36	5.19	8.35	NY 3 in Deferiet	Fargo Road	NY 3 in Wilna	Entire length overlaps with NY 3A
CR 37	1.24	2.00	NY 3 in Herrings	Airport Road	Fort Drum boundary in Wilna	
CR 40	2.26	3.64	NY 3	Dump Road in Wilna	CR 41	
CR 41	3.48	5.60	CR 40	Natural Bridge Road in Wilna	NY 3	
CR 42	4.07	6.55	Carthage village line	West Street Road in Wilna	CR 40	
CR 45	0.85	1.37	Lewis County line (becomes CR 13)	Copenhagen Road in Champion	West Carthage village line	
CR 46	9.35	15.05	Evans Mills village line in Le Ray	Le Ray Street, Dutch Settlement and River roads, and Commercial Street	NY 26 in Theresa village	Part north of CR 136 was formerly part of NY 37D
CR 47	8.06	12.97	CR 163	Humphrey Road in Champion	NY 26	
CR 49	5.76	9.27	CR 160 in Watertown	Rutland Hollow Road	CR 144 in Rutland	
CR 50	0.63	1.01	DPW driveway in Black River	Maple Street Road	NY 971V in Le Ray	Former number; transferred by August 2015.
CR 51	0.92	1.48	CR 190	Teal Drive and Murrock Circle in Pamelia	NY 12	Formerly designated as CR 281.
CR 52			Watertown city limits in Pamelia	Pearl Street	NY 3 in Rutland	Former number; transferred to state in 1979
CR 53 (1)	0.80	1.29	Dexter village line	William Street in Brownville	NY 12E	Former number
CR 53 (2)	6.13	9.87	CR 54 in Brownville village	Brown and Military roads	NY 37 in Pamelia	
CR 54	10.72	17.25	Pike Street in Brownville village	Brown Boulevard and Rockwell Hill and Depauville roads	CR 179 in Clayton	
CR 56			CR 6	Bedford Corners Road in Cape Vincent	NY 12E	Former number
CR 57	10.04	16.16	South Shore Road	Isthmus Road in Lyme	NY 12E	
CR 59	18.42	29.64	NY 12E	Pillar Point Road in Brownville	Dexter village line	
CR 62	6.60	10.62	NY 3 in Hounsfield	Sulphur Springs Road	I-81 exit 44 / NY 970K in Watertown	
CR 63	10.43	16.79	CR 75 in Adams	Massey Street Road	Watertown city line in Watertown	
CR 64	1.29	2.08	US 11 in Adams	Talcott Falls Road	I-81 exit 44 / NY 232 in Watertown	
CR 65	2.97	4.78	NY 232	Ives Street Road in Watertown	Watertown city line	
CR 66	8.12	13.07	I-81 exit 42 / NY 177 in Adams	South Harbor and Salt Point roads	NY 3 / NY 180 in Hounsfield	
CR 67	2.81	4.52	CR 165	Brookside Drive in Watertown	NY 12	
CR 68	4.92	7.92	CR 69 in Rodman	Zoar Road	CR 156 in Watertown	
CR 69	15.88	25.56	Adams village line in Adams	Lowville and Lowville Creek roads	NY 12 in Champion	Briefly enters Lewis County as CR 175
CR 71	5.07	8.16	CR 72	Penny Road in Henderson	CR 75	
CR 72	1.64	2.64	CR 123	Harbor View Road in Henderson	NY 178	
CR 75	10.75	17.30	NY 289 in Ellisburg	Smithville, Butterville and Adams roads	NY 3 in Hounsfield	
CR 76	5.09	8.19	CR 75	Green Settlement Road in Adams	CR 66	
CR 77	2.93	4.72	NY 178	Butterville Road in Adams	CR 75	
CR 78	5.18	8.34	NY 193 in Ellisburg	Hungerford Corners Road	NY 178 in Henderson	
CR 79	4.09	6.58	NY 3	Rural Hill Road in Ellisburg	CR 75	
CR 82	0.90	1.45	CR 91 in Ellisburg	Swan Road	CR 84 in Adams	
CR 84	1.95	3.14	NY 178	Liberty Street Road in Adams	Adams village line	
CR 85	4.52	7.27	NY 289	Wardwell Settlement Road in Ellisburg	US 11	
CR 87	4.48	7.21	Oswego County line in Ellisburg (becomes CR 22A)	Ellis Road	CR 121 in Ellisburg village	
CR 89	1.65	2.66	CR 87	Brewster Road in Ellisburg	I-81 exit 39 / CR 90	
CR 90	9.43	15.18	CR 87 in Ellisburg	Dean School House Road	CR 92 in Lorraine	Discontinuous at Mannsville village limits
CR 91	10.65	17.14	CR 82 in Ellisburg	Manor Road	CR 92 in Lorraine	
CR 92	4.63	7.45	Oswego County line (becomes CR 17)	Redfield Road in Lorraine	CR 93	
CR 93	7.99	12.86	CR 189 in Lorraine	Worth Center Road	CR 96 in Worth	
CR 95	10.26	16.51	CR 92 in Lorraine	Diamond Road	NY 177 in Rodman	
CR 96	4.99	8.03	CR 189	Seven-by-Nine Schoolhouse Road in Worth	Lewis County line (becomes CR 2)	
CR 97	8.80	14.16	US 11 in Ellisburg	Washington Park Road	NY 177 in Rodman	
CR 100	6.44	10.36	St. Lawrence Avenue in Orleans	Westminster Park Road	Bay Avenue in Alexandria	

== Routes 101 and up ==
Route	Length (mi)	Length (km)	From	Via	To	Notes
CR 111	3.23	5.20	NY 37	Schnauber Corners Road in Alexandria	St. Lawrence County line (becomes CR 6)	
CR 120	1.22	1.96	NY 3	Woodville Road in Ellisburg	NY 193	
CR 121	4.28	6.89	NY 3 in Ellisburg	Farm To Market Road	NY 193 in Ellisburg village	
CR 122	1.28	2.06	Oswego County line (becomes CR 22)	Lacona Road in Ellisburg	US 11	
CR 123	3.81	6.13	NY 3	Harbor Road in Henderson	NY 3	
CR 125	6.76	10.88	NY 12E in Chaumont	Stone Street and Point Salubrious and Guffins Bay roads	NY 12E in Chaumont	
CR 128			NY 180 in Brownville	Fox Corners Road	NY 12 in Clayton	
CR 129	0.37	0.60	NY 342	Le Ray Street Road in Le Ray	Black River village line	Former number; transferred by August 2015. Former routing of NY 181
CR 136	1.82	2.93	NY 37	Nobles Corner Road in Theresa	CR 46	Formerly part of NY 37D
CR 138	1.17	1.88	US 11	Sanford Corners Road in Le Ray	NY 342	
CR 143	3.34	5.38	NY 3 in Rutland	Applegate Road	CR 47 in Champion	
CR 144	1.88	3.03	CR 49	Staplin Road in Rutland	CR 143	
CR 145	1.41	2.27	CR 75 in Hounsfield	North Harbor Road	CR 66 in Adams	
CR 152	5.97	9.61	NY 178	Scotts Corners and Stony Creek roads in Henderson	NY 178	
CR 155	7.75	12.47	CR 69 in Rodman	Toad Hollow and Dry Hill roads	CR 165 in Watertown	
CR 156	6.44	10.36	Lewis County line in Rodman (becomes CR 21)	Blackstone Hill and Plank roads	NY 12 in Watertown	
CR 159	1.10	1.77	NY 12	Gotham Street Road in Watertown	Watertown city line	
CR 160	3.80	6.12	NY 126 in Watertown	Middle Road	CR 161 in Rutland	
CR 161	2.74	4.41	CR 69	Tylerville and Eames Corners roads in Rutland	CR 160	
CR 162	2.21	3.56	NY 12	Community Drive So in Rutland	NY 126	
CR 163	4.01	6.45	NY 126 in Rutland	Harpers Ferry Road	Lewis County line in Champion (becomes CR 16)	
CR 165	0.46	0.74	US 11	Watertown Center Road in Watertown	US 11	Former routing of US 11
CR 178	2.58	4.15	Snowshoe Road	Military Road in Henderson	NY 3	Formerly part of NY 178
CR 179	6.09	9.80	NY 12E in Chaumont	Evans Street	NY 12 in Clayton	Formerly part of NY 179
CR 181	5.48	8.82	NY 12 in Clayton	Clayton Street and Clayton Street Road	NY 180 in Orleans	
CR 189	12.22	19.67	US 11 in Adams	Allendale Road	NY 177 in Rodman	Formerly part of NY 178
CR 190	2.97	4.78	NY 12E in Brownville village	Main Street	Watertown city line in Pamelia	Entire length overlapped with NY 12E until sometime between 2008 and 2012
CR 191	3.98	6.41	CR 100	Bridge Road in Orleans	Dead end at I-81	
CR 192	2.84	4.57	NY 26	Unnamed road in Alexandria	NY 37	Formerly NY 287
CR 193	0.79	1.27	NY 26 / NY 37 in Theresa	Main Street	NY 26 in Theresa village	Former routing of NY 26
CR 194	11.57	18.62	NY 26 in Theresa village	Oxbow and Antwerp roads and Willow and Main streets	Fort Drum boundary in Antwerp	Former routing of NY 26
CR 196	1.29	2.08	NY 12F	Fisher Road in Watertown	Jefferson County Industrial Park	
CR 197	0.36	0.58	CR 47	Humphrey Road in Champion	NY 3 / NY 26	Former number.
CR 200	0.96	1.54	CR 202	Little Tree Drive in Watertown	CR 196	
CR 202	1.49	2.40	NY 3	Enterprise Drive in Watertown	CR 200	

== See also ==
- County routes in New York
