= New York State Route 193 =

State highway in Jefferson County, New York, US

New York State Route 193
- Map of Jefferson County in northern New York with NY 193 highlighted in red

Route information
- Maintained by NYSDOT
- Length: 8.53 mi (13.73 km)
- Existed: c. 1931–present

Major junctions
- West end: NY 3 in Ellisburg town
- I-81 in Ellisburg village
- East end: US 11 in Ellisburg town

Location
- Country: United States
- State: New York
- Counties: Jefferson

Highway system
- New York Highways; Interstate; US; State; Reference; Parkways
← NY 192A	→ NY 194

New York State Route 193 (NY 193) is a short state highway located entirely within the town of Ellisburg in the southwest part of Jefferson County in the North Country of New York in the United States. The western terminus of NY 193 is at an intersection with NY 3 at Southwick Beach State Park, just east of Lake Ontario. Its eastern terminus is at a junction with U.S. Route 11 (US 11) in Pierrepont Manor, just east of Interstate 81 (I-81) and north of Mannsville.

== Route description ==
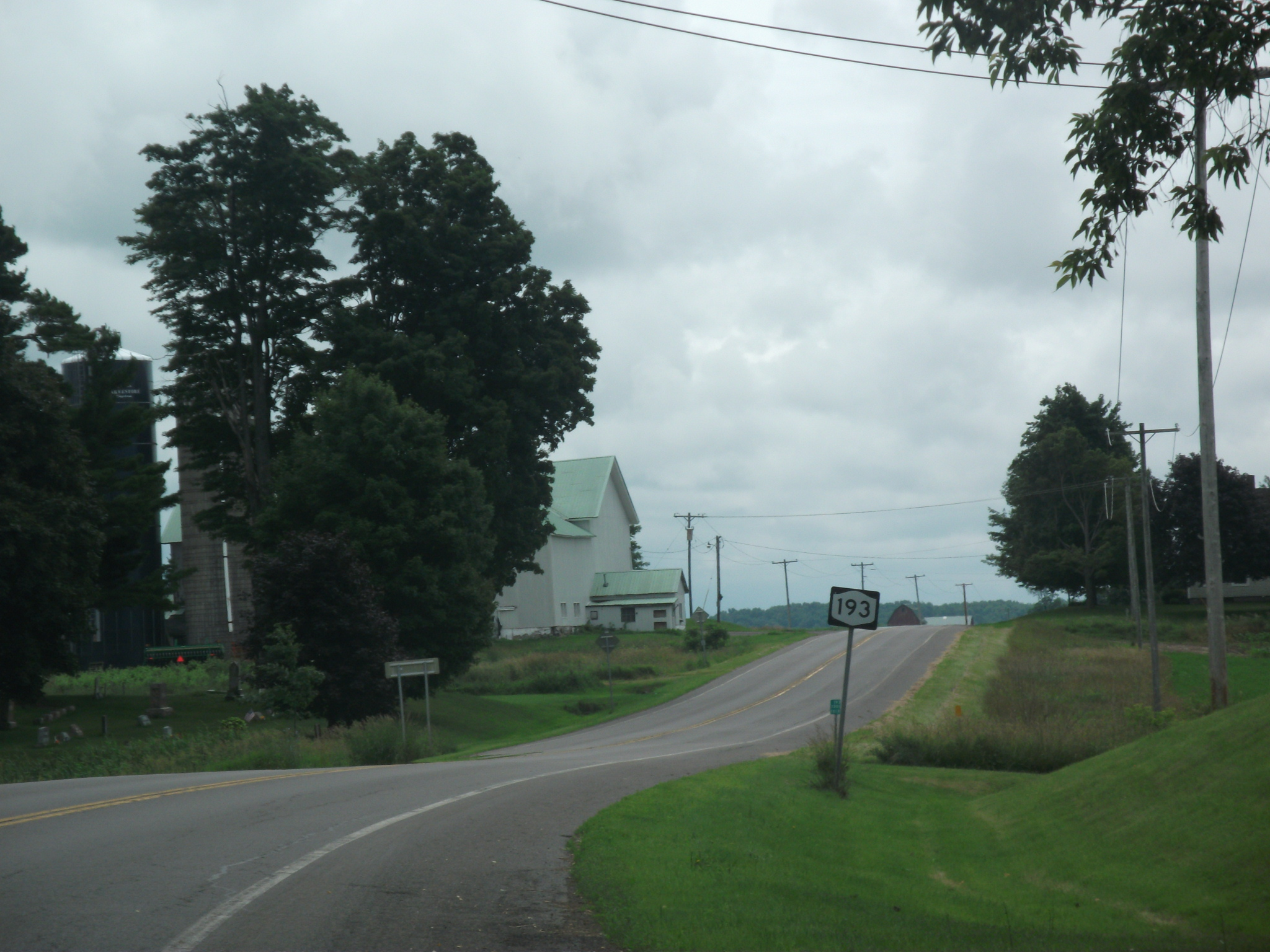
NY 193 heading eastbound through Woodville

NY 193 begins at an intersection with NY 3 (the Seaway Trail) in the town of Ellisburg, across from an entrance to Southwick Beach State Park. NY 193 heads eastward through Ellisburg, crossing County Route 75 (CR 75; Heisel Road/Lake Road) at a rural two-lane junction. NY 193 curves to the southeast, intersecting with CR 78 and CR 120, which connects back to NY 3. At the junction with CR 120, NY 193 is present in the hamlet of Woodville. In Woodville, NY 193 makes a sharper turn to the southeast, before turning eastward and entering the village of Ellisburg. In Ellisburg, the route intersects with NY 289 (Main Street)'s southern terminus. NY 193 has some residences following the sides of the street, crossing South Sandy Creek over a bridge and into the eastern end of Ellisburg.

After crossing South Sandy Creek, NY 193 intersects with CR 121 (Farm to Market Road). The route turns to the northeast as Eisenhauer Road, passing through a stretch of residences, which soon becomes more rural once again, bending eastbound after Scott Road in the town of Ellisburg. NY 193 soon enters interchange 40 on I-81 from the northwest, crossing a nearby railroad line before entering the hamlet of Pierrepont Manor, where NY 193 terminates at an intersection with US 11 1.5 miles (2.4 km) north of Mannsville.

== History ==
The segment of modern NY 193 between Woodville and Ellisburg was originally designated as part of NY 3C as part of the 1930 renumbering of state highways in New York. NY 3C continued north from Woodville on what is now CR 78 and south from Ellisburg on current CR 121. NY 193 was assigned to its current alignment between Ellisburg and Pierrepont Manor by the following year. A new lakeside highway between Sandy Creek and the modern junction of NY 3 and NY 193 was opened to traffic c. 1932 as a realignment of then-NY 3D. An extension of the highway north to Henderson was completed by the following year, at which time NY 3D was realigned onto the highway and NY 193 was extended westward to meet the lakeside highway by way of NY 3D's former routing to Woodville and a new highway between the lake shore and Woodville.

== Major intersections ==
The entire route is in Jefferson County.

Location	mi	km	Destinations	Notes
Town of Ellisburg	0.00	0.00	NY 3 (Seaway Trail) – Oswego, Watertown	Western terminus
Village of Ellisburg	4.28	6.89	NY 289 north (Main Street) – Belleville	Southern terminus of NY 289
Town of Ellisburg	7.64	12.30	I-81 – Watertown, Syracuse	Exit 138 (I-81)
Town of Ellisburg	8.53	13.73	US 11	Eastern terminus; hamlet of Pierrepont Manor
1.000 mi = 1.609 km; 1.000 km = 0.621 mi
