= Ellisburg (village), New York =

Ellisburg, New York
- Village
- Location within New York Location within the United States
- Coordinates: 43°43′54″N 76°8′1″W
- Country: United States
- State: New York
- County: Jefferson
- Town: Ellisburg

Area
  - Total: 1.00 sq mi (2.59 km^{2})
  - Land: 1.00 sq mi (2.59 km^{2})
  - Water: 0 sq mi (0.00 km^{2})
- Elevation: 330 ft (100 m)

Population (2020)
  - Total: 186
  - Density: 185.8/sq mi (71.72/km^{2})
- Time zone: UTC-5 (Eastern (EST))
  - Summer (DST): UTC-4 (EDT)
- ZIP Codes: 13636 (Ellisburg); 13661 (Mannsville)
- Area code: 315
- FIPS code: 36-24075
- GNIS feature ID: 0975770

Ellisburg is a village in Jefferson County, New York, United States. The population was 244 at the 2010 census. The village is named after two brothers who were the original landowners. It is located near the middle of the town of Ellisburg and is southwest of Watertown.

== History ==
The village was first settled circa 1797 by Lyman Ellis and was also called "Ellisburgh". The village set itself off from the town by incorporation in 1895.

== Geography ==
Ellisburg is located in southern Jefferson County at 43°43′54″N 76°8′1″W (43.731775, -76.133695). According to the United States Census Bureau, it has a total area of 1.0 square mile (2.6 km^{2}), all land.

South Sandy Creek flows through the center of the village, leading southwestward to Lake Ontario.

Ellisburg is at the junction of New York State Route 193, New York State Route 289, and County Road 87. NY-193 leads 4 miles (6 km) east to Pierrepont Manor and northwest the same distance to NY-3 at Southwick Beach State Park near Lake Ontario. NY-289 leads north 3.5 miles (5.6 km) to Belleville. Interstate 81 is 3.5 miles (5.6 km) east of Ellisburg via NY-193 and leads an additional 20 miles (32 km) north to Watertown, the county seat.

== Demographics ==
Historical population
Census	Pop.	Note	%±
1880	222		—
1890	336		51.4%
1900	292		−13.1%
1910	702		140.4%
1920	275		−60.8%
1930	253		−8.0%
1940	253		0.0%
1950	285		12.6%
1960	328		15.1%
1970	337		2.7%
1980	307		−8.9%
1990	246		−19.9%
2000	269		9.3%
2010	244		−9.3%
2020	186		−23.8%
U.S. Decennial Census

As of the census of 2000, there were 269 people, 91 households, and 69 families residing in the village. The population density was 266.1 inhabitants per square mile (102.7/km^{2}). There were 100 housing units at an average density of 98.9 per square mile (38.2/km^{2}). The racial makeup of the village was 99.26% White, and 0.74% from two or more races. Hispanic or Latino of any race were 0.37% of the population.

There were 91 households, out of which 45.1% had children under the age of 18 living with them, 57.1% were married couples living together, 15.4% had a female householder with no husband present, and 23.1% were non-families. 17.6% of all households were made up of individuals, and 11.0% had someone living alone who was 65 years of age or older. The average household size was 2.96 and the average family size was 3.34.

In the village, the population was spread out, with 30.9% under the age of 18, 11.9% from 18 to 24, 28.3% from 25 to 44, 19.0% from 45 to 64, and 10.0% who were 65 years of age or older. The median age was 35 years. For every 100 females, there were 94.9 males. For every 100 females age 18 and over, there were 97.9 males.

The median income for a household in the village was $39,750, and the median income for a family was $45,313. Males had a median income of $31,875 versus $20,000 for females. The per capita income for the village was $14,569. About 18.8% of families and 21.6% of the population were below the poverty line, including 35.3% of those under the age of eighteen and none of those 65 or over.

== Education ==
The school district is the Belleville Henderson Central School District.

== Notable person ==
- John M. McHugh, US Secretary of the Army
