= South Sandy Creek =

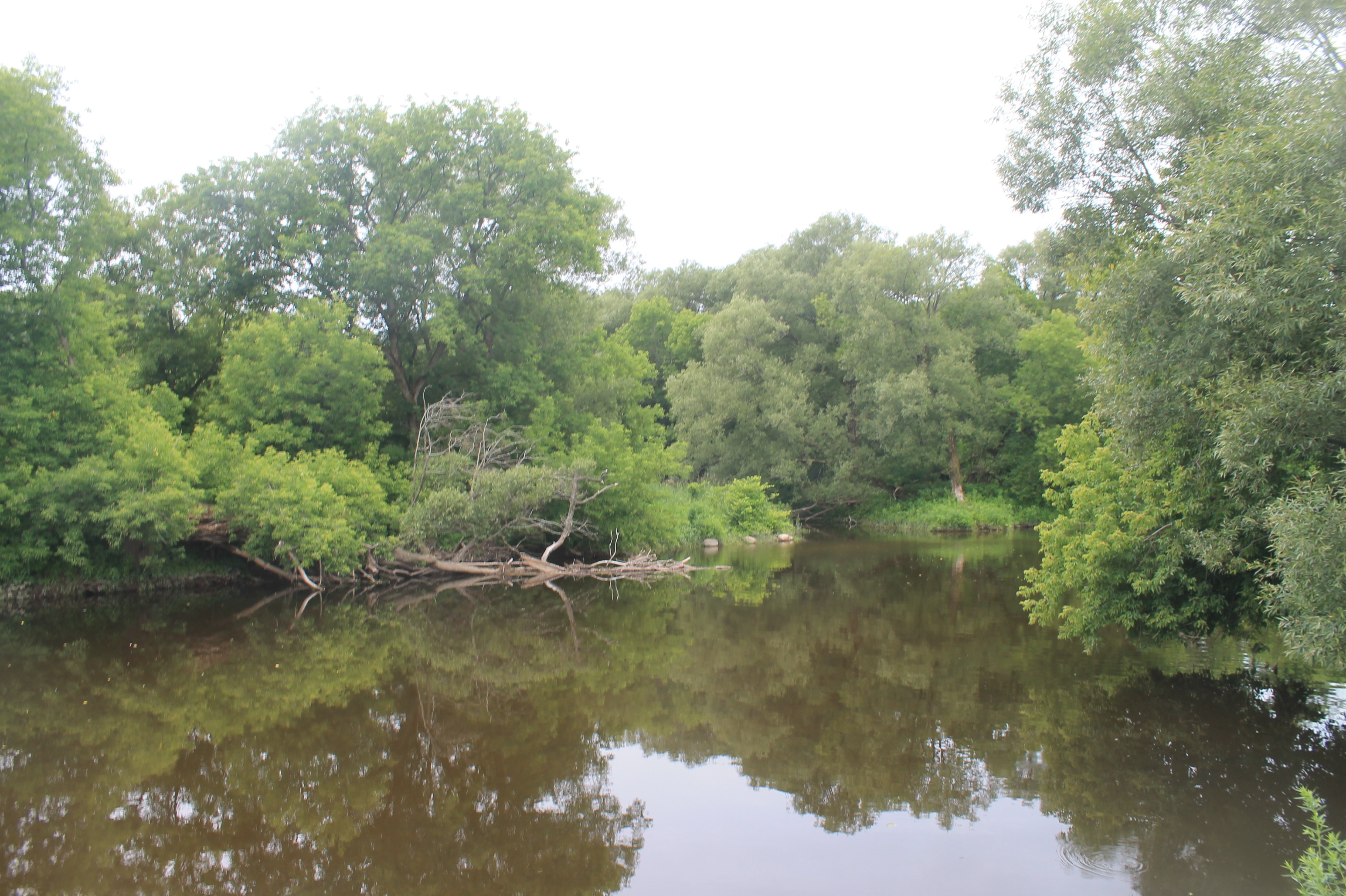
- South Sandy Creek as it enters Lakeview Wildlife Management Area near its mouth at Lake Ontario.

- Location of the mouth of South Sandy Creek in New York State. South Sandy Creek (the United States)

Location
- Country: United States
- State: New York
- Region: Upstate New York

Physical characteristics
- Source: Tug Hill
  - coordinates: 43°45′07″N 75°47′31″W
- Mouth: Lake Ontario
  - location: Lakeview Wildlife Management Area
  - coordinates: 43°43′12″N 76°12′10″W

South Sandy Creek is a small tributary to Lake Ontario in Jefferson and Lewis counties in the U.S. state of New York. South Sandy Creek flows from its source in the Tug Hill region westward through the village of Ellisburg before emptying into Lake Ontario.

== History ==
During the War of 1812 the "Battle Of Big Sandy" was fought along the banks of the lower end of the stream. A public parking lot on New York State Route 3 has a memorial dedicated to the Americans who fought and died here.

== Sportfishing ==
Today, South Sandy Creek is known for its seasonal salmon and trout runs, and is a popular alternative for anglers looking to avoid the crowds at the nearby Salmon River. Runs of Chinook salmon occur from September through November, followed by steelhead that enter the creek during November and remain until their spawning season is over in April. South Sandy Creek is stocked annually by the NYSDEC; in 2013, 100,000 Chinook salmon and 28,750 steelhead trout were stocked in the creek. The lower end of the river has a rock and mud bottom with deep, slow moving water. From the Ellisburg bridge upwards to the impassable waterfalls, the creek has a limestone bottom with shallow holes and many runs and riffles.
