= New York State Route 289 =

State highway in Jefferson County, New York, US

New York State Route 289
- Map of Jefferson County in northern New York with NY 289 highlighted in red

Route information
- Maintained by NYSDOT
- Length: 5.95 mi (9.58 km)
- Existed: 1930–present

Major junctions
- South end: NY 193 in Ellisburg
- North end: NY 178 in Adams

Location
- Country: United States
- State: New York
- Counties: Jefferson

Highway system
- New York Highways; Interstate; US; State; Reference; Parkways
← NY 288	→ I-290

New York State Route 289 (NY 289) is a north–south state highway in Jefferson County, New York, in the United States. The southern terminus of the route is at NY 193 in the village of Ellisburg near the center of the town of Ellisburg. Its northern terminus is at NY 178 in the extreme southwestern corner of the town of Adams.

== Route description ==
NY 289 begins in the village of Ellisburg at a junction with NY 193. It travels north through the small village on Main Street, then enters the surrounding town of Ellisburg. The route heads onward through open fields to the hamlet of Belleville. Here, NY 289 intersects with County Route 75 (CR 75). CR 75 enters the hamlet from the west and exits to the north while NY 289 continues to the northeast, following Sandy Creek. Before exiting Belleville, NY 289 passes the back road to Belleville–Henderson Central School. The route continues northeast into the town of Adams, where it ends at a junction with NY 178 about 3 miles (5 km) west of where NY 178 connects to Interstate 81 at exit 41.

== History ==
The entirety of NY 289 was assigned as part of the 1930 renumbering of state highways in New York.

== Major intersections ==
The entire route is in Jefferson County.

Location	mi	km	Destinations	Notes
Village of Ellisburg	0.00	0.00	NY 193 – Woodville	Southern terminus
Town of Adams	5.95	9.58	NY 178	Northern terminus
1.000 mi = 1.609 km; 1.000 km = 0.621 mi
