= Interstate 81 in New York =

Highway in New York

Interstate 81
- Penn-Can Highway
- Map of New York with I-81 highlighted in red

Route information
- Maintained by NYSDOT and the Thousand Islands Bridge Authority
- Length: 183.60 mi (295.48 km)
- Existed: August 14, 1957–present
- NHS: Entire route

Major junctions
- South end: I-81 at the Pennsylvania state line near Kirkwood
- I-86 / NY 17 in Kirkwood; I-88 in Chenango; NY 13 in Cortland; US 11 / US 20 in LaFayette; I-690 in East Syracuse; I-90 Toll / New York Thruway in DeWitt; NY 104 in Parish; NY 3 in Watertown; I-781 in Fort Drum
- North end: Highway 137 at the Canadian border on Wellesley Island

Location
- Country: United States
- State: New York
- Counties: Broome, Cortland, Onondaga, Oswego, Jefferson

Highway system
- Interstate Highway System; Main; Auxiliary; Suffixed; Business; Future; New York Highways; Interstate; US; State; Reference; Parkways
← NY 80	→ NY 81

Interstate 81 (I-81) is a part of the Interstate Highway System that runs from I-40 at Dandridge, Tennessee, to the Thousand Islands Bridge at Wellesley Island in New York, beyond which the short 2.7-mile (4.3 km) Ontario Highway 137 (Highway 137) links it to Highway 401. In the US state of New York, I-81 extends 183.60 miles (295.48 km) from the Pennsylvania state line southeast of Binghamton to the Canadian border at Wellesley Island northwest of Alexandria Bay. The freeway runs north–south through Central New York, serving the cities of Binghamton, Syracuse, and Watertown. It passes through the Thousand Islands in its final miles and crosses two bridges, both part of the series of bridges known as the Thousand Islands Bridge.

South of Watertown, I-81 closely parallels US Route 11 (US 11), the main north–south highway in Central New York prior to the construction of I-81. At Watertown, US 11 turns northeastward to head across New York's North Country region while I-81 continues on a generally northward track to the Canadian border. From there, the road continues into the province of Ontario as Highway 137, a short route leading north to the nearby Highway 401.

The portion of I-81 in New York was originally developed as the Penn-Can Highway, one of four expressways proposed by the state in 1953. It was added to the Interstate Highway System and designated I-81 in 1957 and constructed in sections over the course of the next decade. The first segment was completed in the mid-1950s, running from Tully to the southern edge of Syracuse. The last piece opened in the late 1960s, linking Marathon to Whitney Point.

== Route description ==
=== Southern Tier ===
I-81 crosses the New York–Pennsylvania border about 11 miles (18 km) southeast of the city of Binghamton. The freeway heads northwest from the state line, running through a valley surrounding the Susquehanna River in the town of Kirkwood. This stretch of I-81 closely parallels US 11, continuing a trend that originally began at I-81's southern terminus in eastern Tennessee. Both roads head across relatively undeveloped areas along the eastern riverbank to the outskirts of Binghamton, where I-81 merges with I-86 in an industrial area east of the city. I-81 and I-86 overlap for five miles (8.0 km), running along the northern edge of the Binghamton suburbs before entering the city itself. About 1.5 miles (2.4 km) north of downtown, the freeway connects to Brandywine Highway, a limited-access road carrying NY 7 through mostly residential areas on the north side of the city.

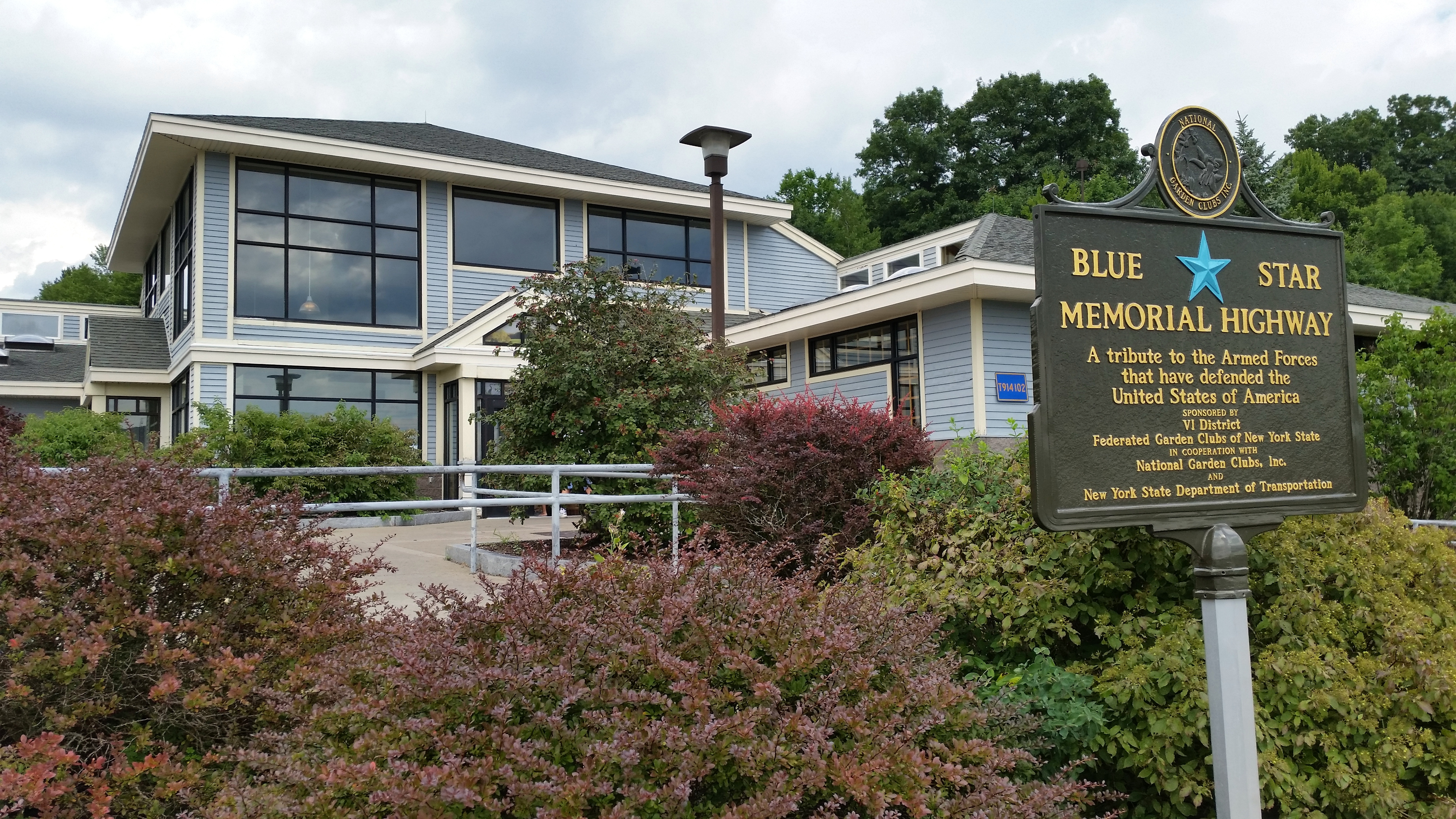
"Taste NY" at the Gateway Information Center, I-81 north, Kirkwood

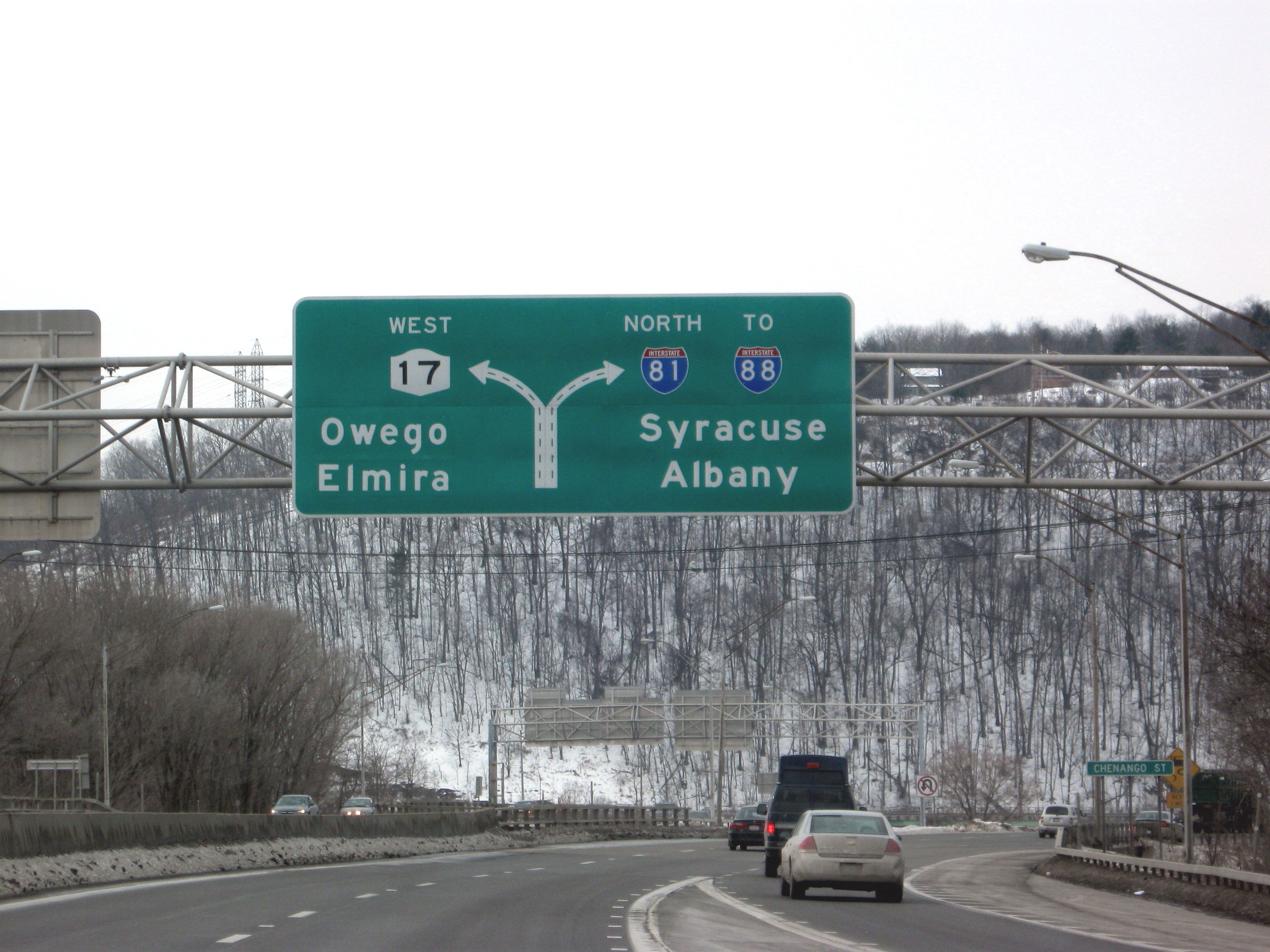
I-86 / NY 17 leave I-81 in Binghamton to head west toward Corning at the former Kamikaze Curve.

Just west of the Brandywine Highway junction, I-81 and I-86 cross the Chenango River as they split at a directional T interchange comprising part of an S-curve in I-86 known locally as Kamikaze Curve. While I-86 heads west into the curve, I-81 proceeds northward along the west bank of the river, connecting to US 11 and passing by SUNY Broome on its way into the suburban town of Chenango. Here, I-81 meets the western terminus of I-88 at a junction roughly three miles (4.8 km) north of Binghamton. Continuing on, the freeway intersects US 11 a second time before leaving the banks of the Susquehanna River and proceeding generally northwestward into increasingly rural areas of the Southern Tier. The route makes its way across a series of hills and valleys for 13 miles (21 km) to the village of Whitney Point, connecting to US 11 and two state routes of regional importance—NY 26 and NY 79—at two exits on the western edge of the community.

Continuing on, I-81 begins to follow the Tioughnioga River, a tributary of the Susquehanna, as it bypasses the nearby village of Lisle to the east. While US 11 runs across the base of a valley flanking the river, the freeway proceeds along the valley's eastern edge, overlooking the valley road on its way to the Broome–Cortland county line. Both routes cross the border at points just yards apart, beginning their transition from the Southern Tier region to Central New York. About two miles (3.2 km) from the county line, I-81 encounters the village of Marathon, situated inside the river valley at the junction of US 11 and NY 221. The freeway connects to the latter at an interchange just east of the village center before heading northwestward for 11 miles (18 km) across a series of moraines in another prolonged rural stretch. Along the way, I-81 passes between the Tuller Hill and Hoxie Gorge state forests, located near Messengerville on the western and eastern sides of the highway, respectively.

=== Cortland to Syracuse ===
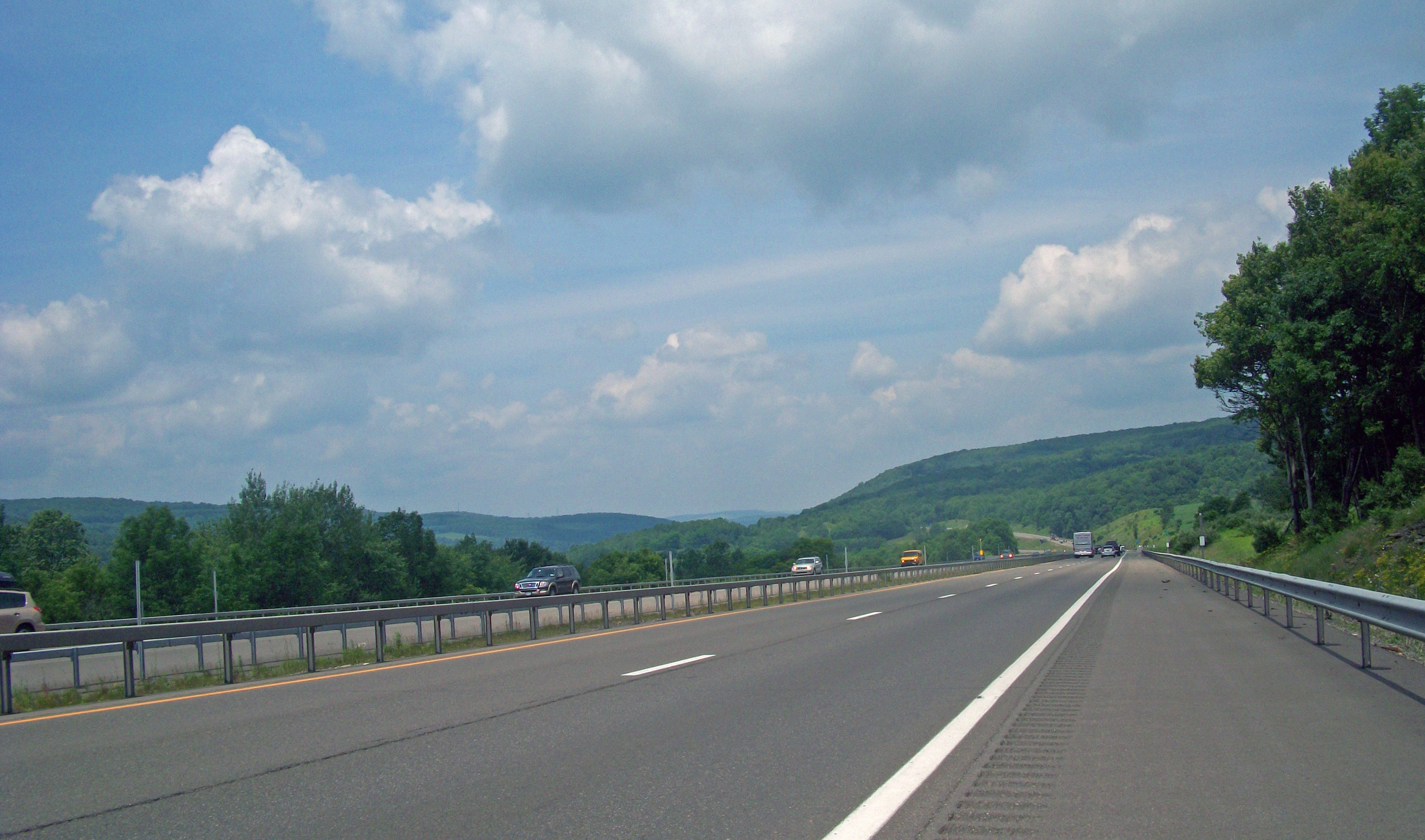
I-81 among the moraines south of Cortland

The rural, northwestward trend ends west of the village of McGraw at a junction with NY 41, the primary east–west (signed north–south) road through the community. NY 41 continues west from the exit for a short distance to meet US 11, and the two routes become concurrent for the next five miles (8.0 km). I-81, US 11, and NY 41 all head westward from this point, passing a handful of scattered businesses to reach the eastern edge of the nearby city of Cortland. While US 11 and NY 41 continue directly into the city, I-81 bypasses it to the northeast. As such, it crosses only moderately developed areas on the periphery of Cortland. The road connects to downtown Cortland by way of an exit with NY 13, a north–south route serving most of Central New York. Near the exit, the Tioughnioga River splits into two branches, with NY 13 following the east branch to the northeast and I-81 proceeding westward along the west branch.

North of downtown Cortland, I-81 makes a 90-degree turn to the north, matching a similar curve in the course of the nearby river. This track brings the freeway to the suburban village of Homer, which I-81 connects to via exit 54. The trumpet interchange feeds into a long east–west ramp linking the highway to the parallel US 11, NY 41, and NY 281, another parallel road farther west. NY 41 leaves US 11 in Homer, and I-81, US 11, and NY 281 proceed slightly northeastward across a low-lying, undeveloped area in an otherwise hilly region of Cortland County. Just south of the Onondaga County line, I-81 directly meets NY 281 as it crosses from the western side of the freeway to the eastern edge. They meet one final time across the county line near the village of Tully, where NY 281 ends as I-81 intersects NY 80 and NY 11A. The west branch of the Tioughnioga River also terminates here, flowing into Tully Lake at the county line.

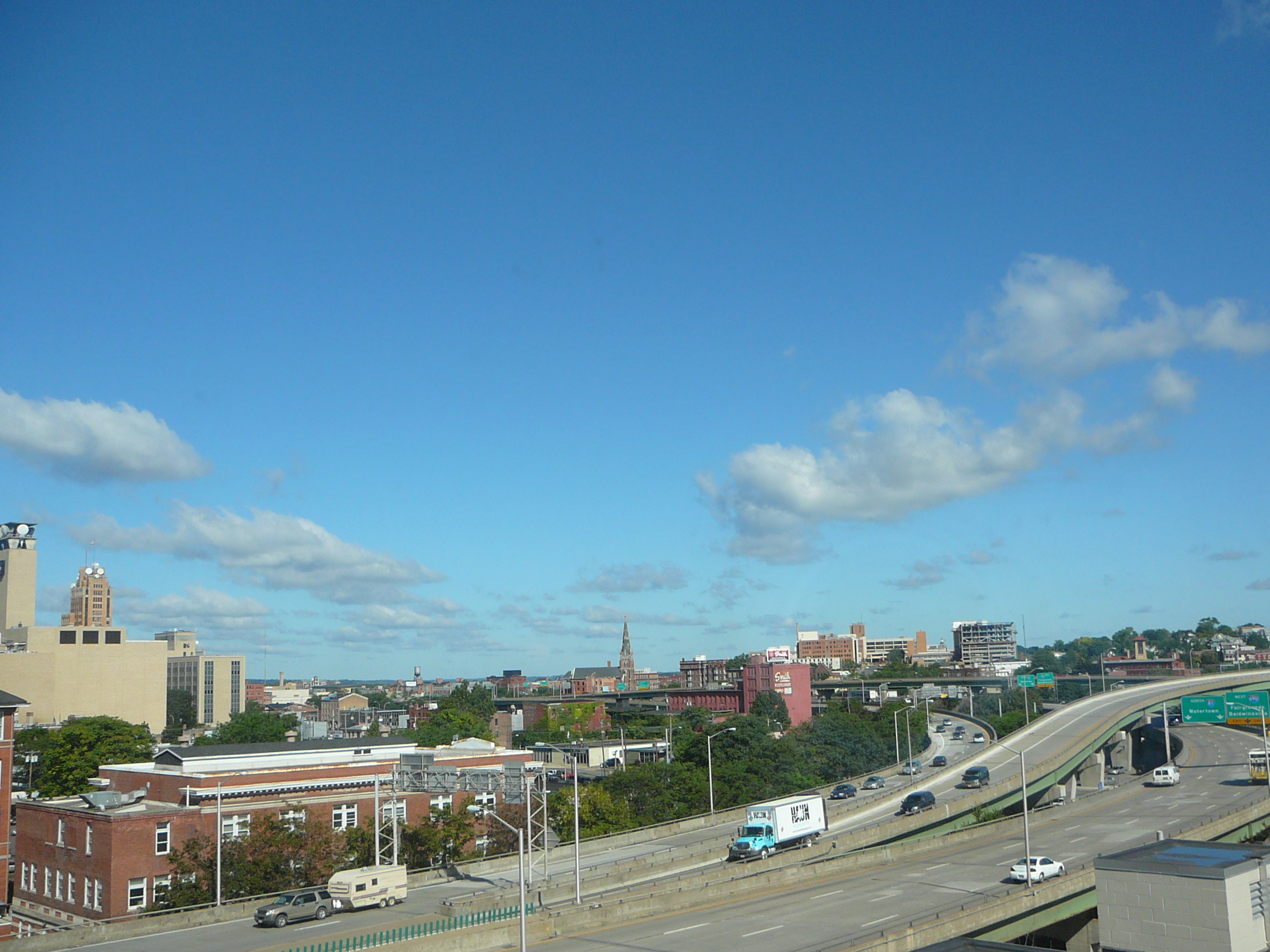
The now former I-81 at I-690 in Downtown Syracuse, set for demolition to make way for I-81 Business

The amount of development along the freeway slowly increases as it heads north through the county. In LaFayette, I-81 meets with US 20, one of a handful of east–west roads spanning the width of the state. Continuing on, I-81 and US 11 pass east of Onondaga Reservation, connecting once again at exit 78 before entering the city of Syracuse. At this point, the forests that had lined both roads give way to the dense residential neighborhoods that comprise the city's southern half. Roughly three miles (4.8 km) south of Downtown Syracuse, I-81 meets with I-81 Bus, a business route of I-81 which passes through it.

=== Syracuse and Oswego County ===
After the interchange with I-81 Bus, I-81 itself turns due southeast, paralleling the New York, Susquehanna and Western Railway (NYSW) at the south edge of Syracuse University and north edge of Clark Reservation State Park. I-81 then quickly turns northeast, crossing over the NYSW and passing through the town of DeWitt, where it meets with the eastern terminus of I-690 at a directional T interchange in the village of East Syracuse. Continuing north, I-81 then meets the New York State Thruway (I-90) at a double trumpet interchange at exit 90, before turning due northwest at the south edge of the Cicero Swamp Wildlife Management Area. About six miles (9.7 km) north of Downtown Syracuse, the highway enters the village of North Syracuse, where it intersects the southern terminus of NY 481 shortly before being rejoined by I-81 Bus.

While NY 481 continues northwest from North Syracuse as a spur off of I-81, I-81 turns due north and travels through residential areas of gradually decreasing density. Just north of the junction with I-81 Bus and NY 481, the freeway passes east of Driver's Village, formerly the former Penn-Can Mall, the largest commercial parcel in the area. I-81's first junction north of Syracuse is in the town of Cicero, where it connects to NY 31, another regionally important highway. North of here, US 11 begins to closely parallel I-81 once again, rejoining the highway's vicinity after following an erratic alignment through Syracuse. The two roads run across relatively flat and increasingly undeveloped land to Brewerton, a hamlet adjacent to where Oneida Lake empties into the Oneida River. While US 11 runs through the community, I-81 bypasses it to the east, offering unobstructed views of the lake as it crosses the lake outlet and enters Oswego County.

On the opposite riverbank, I-81 initially runs past a line of lakefront houses and cottages; however, it soon enters a large marshy area named Big Bay Swamp. The wetlands reach as far north as Central Square, a village just west of I-81's interchange with NY 49. For most of the next 13 miles (21 km), I-81 runs north across a mixture of swamps and fields, both undeveloped and fairly level in elevation. Along this stretch, the freeway links to two more major routes: NY 69 and NY 104. The highway eventually reaches the village of Pulaski, where it reconnects to NY 13 at a partial interchange east of the village center. From here to Watertown, I-81 loosely parallels Lake Ontario, located about seven miles (11 km) to the west and more closely followed by NY 3. Another substantial stretch of open, rolling fields brings the route to Sandy Creek, where it connects to County Route 15 (CR 15), a highway designated NY 288 during the 1930s.

=== North Country ===
Past Sandy Creek, I-81 proceeds into Jefferson County, where it continues to travel across rural, undeveloped areas with only gentle elevation changes. US 11 crosses I-81 for the last time just north of the county line, connecting to the freeway and switching from the highway's west side to its east side. As a result, I-81 now passes west of several villages and large hamlets, all located directly on US 11. Connections to the communities are made by the primary east–west highways serving them, namely CR 90 for Mannsville, NY 193 for Pierrepont Manor, NY 178 for Adams, and NY 177 for Adams Center. At Adams Center, both I-81 and US 11 take on a more northeasterly routing, bringing them farther inland toward the city of Watertown. The final exit before the city itself leads to NY 232, a short connector between I-81 and Watertown Center, the southern extent of Watertown's suburbs.

The rural surroundings finally end, albeit briefly, in the vicinity of Watertown, where I-81 intersects NY 3 in a commercialized area west of downtown Watertown. All four corners of the junction contain at least one shopping plaza, and the northwestern corner features the sprawling Salmon Run Mall. The commercial development follows I-81 north to its next exit, a diamond interchange with NY 12F near Jefferson Community College. At this point, I-81 turns northeastward, running south of an industrial park and north of the college before crossing the Black River to meet NY 12 in a less developed but still commercialized area north of the city. US 11 and I-81 finally part ways at this point, with I-81 continuing north toward Canada and US 11 heading northeast to serve some of the North Country's northernmost communities.

As the highway leaves the Watertown area, it passes into another area of rolling, open terrain with only pockets of development in the immediate vicinity of the road's interchanges. NY 37 largely replaces US 11 as the paralleling surface route, and the state route follows I-81 for 13 miles (21 km) to the vicinity of Theresa. West of the village, I-81 intersects NY 411, a connector between La Fargeville and NY 37. While NY 37 continues north from Theresa, I-81 turns to the northwest, crossing increasingly isolated areas of the state to reach NY 12 on the south shore of the St. Lawrence River midway between Clayton and Alexandria Bay. From here, the freeway becomes a two-lane, undivided highway east of Fishers Landing, and heads into the Thousand Islands on the first of several bridges over the St. Lawrence known collectively as the Thousand Islands Bridge. The long, continuous bridge span between the U.S. mainland and Wellesley Island (one of the archipelago's largest) is one of the few remaining two-lane stretches on the Interstate Highway System.

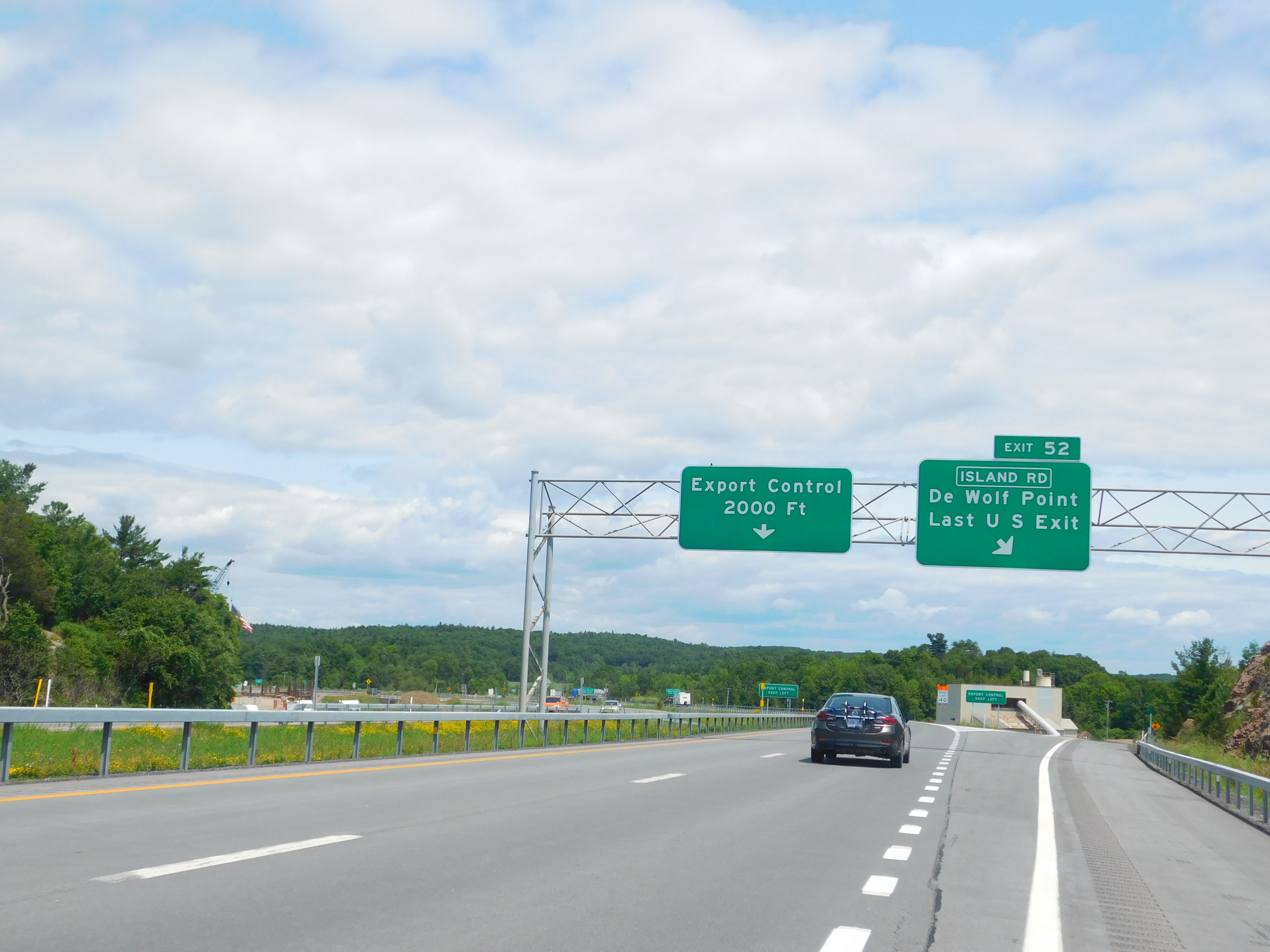
I-81 northbound at exit 186, the last exit along its route as it approaches Canada.

In the Thousand Islands, I-81 becomes a four-lane freeway again and runs across the sparsely-developed Wellesley Island, initially heading northwest and connecting to a pair of county-maintained roads before turning northeast at the eastern edge of Wellesley Island State Park. The freeway turns one final time near the northern edge of the island, curving back to the northwest at exit 186, the last exit along I-81. For most of its run on Wellesley Island, I-81 runs along or close to the island's edge, permitting views of the St. Lawrence River and some of the area's other islands. Not far from exit 186, an interchange linking the freeway to a paralleling local road, I-81 crosses the International Rift on a 90-foot (27 m) bridge connecting Wellesley Island to Hill Island in Ontario, Canada, terminating at the Canadian border at the bridge's midpoint. From here, the physical road continues north as Highway 137 onto Hill Island, Constance Island, Georgina Island, and the Canadian mainland via the Canadian spans of the Thousand Islands Bridge before finally ending at a trumpet interchange with Highway 401.

== History ==
The Binghamton–Syracuse–Watertown corridor was originally served by NY 2, a route assigned as part of the creation of the modern New York state route system in 1924. It was replaced by US 11 when US Routes were first posted in New York in 1927. In February 1953, New York Governor Thomas E. Dewey proposed constructing four expressways across the state of New York to supplement the then-under construction New York State Thruway. One of the four proposed highways closely followed US 11, beginning in Binghamton and proceeding generally northward through Central New York to the Canadian border north of Watertown. A connection to the Pennsylvania state line was eventually added to the route, which became known as the Penn-Can Highway. On August 14, 1957, the Penn-Can Highway was included in the Interstate Highway System and designated as part of I-81.

In the mid-1950s, the first section of the highway was completed, connecting Tully (now exit 66) to Nedrow (now exit 78), just south of Syracuse. Another section, extending from North Syracuse (now exit 8) to Brewerton (now exit 102), was opened to traffic in the late 1950s. In the North Country, the first completed section ran from Adams (now exit 143) to Pamelia (now exit 160); it was put into service on October 21, 1959. Extensions of the North Syracuse–Brewerton segment south into Downtown Syracuse (now exit 3B) and north to Parish (now exit 114) were completed c. 1961. The section between modern exits 134 and 143 in southern Jefferson County was finished in November 1961, and the gap between the Syracuse–Parish and Jefferson County segments was filled on December 1, 1961, creating a continuous limited-access highway between Syracuse and Watertown.

I-81 was opened to traffic from the Pennsylvania state line north to NY 17 in Kirkwood in mid-1961, and the piece linking Pamelia to the Canadian border was completed on September 29, 1965. Three more sections of I-81 were finished to traffic in the mid-1960s, completing all of I-81 within the state except for the portion between NY 221 in Marathon and NY 26 in Whitney Point. The last section of I-81 in New York, the Marathon–Whitney Point segment, was dedicated and opened by Governor Nelson Rockefeller on October 18, 1968. In Syracuse, part of I-81 was built on an elevated highway, intended to make travel from Downtown Syracuse to Syracuse University faster.

The construction of the I-81 came with much controversy. After the freeway was completed, many neighborhoods were disrupted by the presence of the freeway. One neighborhood in particular, the 15th Ward in Syracuse, was largely replaced by the freeway. This decimated a close-knit Black American community. When the displaced community attempted to disperse out into the city, white residents fled, reducing the population of the city by 30 percent over 60 years, while the population of the county grew 55 percent.

The portion for road in Binghamton, nicknamed the Kamikaze Curve due to its hazardous design, was demolished and replaced as part of a project undertaken from 2014 to December 2020. This also saw nearby exits rebuilt in an effort to reduce congestion. A concurrency with I-86 is set to be eventually addition to the portion between exit 8 and exit 14.

=== Syracuse viaduct removal project ===
The removal of sections of I-81 running through Syracuse has been discussed since at least the turn of the 21st century. In 2001, Syracuse Common Councillor Van Robinson called for the removal of some elevated portions of I-81 that were blocking Upstate Medical University. He stated that the bridge not only presented a problem sectionalizing the Syracuse area but also it presented a problem for Syracuse University and SUNY Upstate. One major reason for the urgency of this effort is the condition of the elevated highway and other bridges located on I-81 between the I-481 interchanges on opposite sides of the city, as well as on I-690 in the vicinity of I-81's interchange with the highway.

In 2011, the official process in deciding the future of I-81 was started by two entities: NYSDOT and the Syracuse Metropolitan Transportation Council (SMTC), the region's metropolitan planning organization. NYSDOT is responsible for overseeing the process and, eventually, its construction. SMTC consists of member agencies that have a stake in transportation decisions in Central New York.

In 2019, NYSDOT selected the "community grid" alternative for reconstructing I-81 through Syracuse. Under this plan, I-81 would be rerouted to bypass Syracuse along the I-481 alignment while the section of I-81 through Syracuse would be designated as a business loop of I-81. This alternative, which was expected to cost between $1.9 billion and $2.2 billion, would tear down the elevated viaduct and reconstruct Almond Street as an at-grade boulevard. Also as a part of this project, both of the interchanges between I-81 and I-481 would be reconstructed to allow I-481 to be converted to I-81.

Construction was expected to start in mid-2020 and take five years to complete. However, in May 2021, Governor Andrew Cuomo announced the project would not commence until the following year. At this time, the New York state government allocated $800 million to the "community grid" plan. In preparation for the reconstruction/relocation of I-81 around Syracuse, the American Association of State Highway and Transportation Officials (AASHTO), at its annual Spring Meeting in May 2021, conditionally approved NYSDOT's application to reroute I-81 over I-481 around the east side of Syracuse and redesignate I-81 through Syracuse as Interstate 81 Business (I-81 Bus), also known as Business Loop 81 (BL 81), pending concurrence from the Federal Highway Administration (FHWA). NYSDOT would renumber I-81 exits from sequential to mile-based along its entire length following the rerouting of I-81 around Syracuse.

The process of demolishing I-81 in Syracuse began in 2023. Some local residents worried the removal would accelerate gentrification, while many other residents did not have such fears. Some business owners in varying locations worried about a loss of revenue from the changes to vehicle traffic patterns, while many business owners were excited for increased foot traffic. Court challenges to the removal produced only temporary delays. Both I-81/I-481 interchanges had been reconstructed by June 2026. On September 22, 2026, FHWA formally redesignated I-481 as I-81.

== Exit list ==
All exits in New York formerly used sequential numbering. The New York State Department of Transportation has begun replacing the numbers with mile numbering.

County	Location	mi	km	Old exit	New exit	Destinations	Notes
Broome	Kirkwood	0.00	0.00			I-81 south – Scranton	Continuation into Pennsylvania
Broome	Kirkwood	3.98	6.41	1	3	US 11 / NY 7 – Kirkwood, Conklin	
Broome	Kirkwood	8.08– 8.66	13.00– 13.94	2E	8E	I-86 east / NY 17 east – New York City	Southern end of I-86/NY 17 concurrency; exit number not signed southbound
Broome	Kirkwood	8.08– 8.66	13.00– 13.94	2W	8W	To US 11 – Industrial Park, Five Mile Point	Access via NY 990G; signed for Industrial Park northbound, Five Mile Point southbound
Broome	Kirkwood	8.90	14.32	3	9	To US 11 – Industrial Park	Southbound exit and northbound entrance; access via Colesville Road
Broome	Binghamton	12.17	19.59	3	11	Broad Avenue	Northbound exit and southbound entrance
Broome	Binghamton	12.55	20.20	4A	12	NY 7 – Binghamton, Port Dickinson	Access to NY 363 and Downtown Binghamton
Broome	Binghamton	13.05	21.00	4B	13A	I-86 west / NY 17 west – Corning	Northern end of I-86/NY 17 concurrency
Broome	Dickinson	13.72	22.08	5A	13B	US 11 (Front Street) to I-88 east – SUNY Broome	I-88 not signed northbound
Broome	Chenango	14.78	23.79	5B	14	I-88 east – Albany	No southbound exit; western terminus of I-88; exit number not signed
Broome	Chenango	15.83– 16.62	25.48– 26.75	6	16	US 11 to I-88 east / NY 12 – Nimmonsburg, Chenango Bridge	I-88 not signed northbound
Broome	Chenango	21.62	34.79	7	21	US 11 – Castle Creek	
Broome	Barker	28.99	46.65	8	28	NY 26 / US 11 / NY 79 / NY 206 – Whitney Point, Lisle	Northbound exit and southbound entrance
Broome	Triangle	30.38	48.89	8	30	US 11 / NY 79 / NY 26 / NY 206 – Whitney Point, Lisle	Southbound exit and northbound entrance
Cortland	Village of Marathon	38.27	61.59	9	38 (NB); 39 (SB)	US 11 / NY 221 – Marathon	
Cortland	Cortlandville	50.02	80.50	10	50	US 11 / NY 41 – Cortland, McGraw	Cortland not signed southbound
Cortland	Cortland	52.36	84.27	11	52	NY 13 (Clinton Avenue) – Cortland, Ithaca	Ithaca not signed northbound; access to SUNY Cortland
Cortland	Cortlandville	54.09	87.05	12	54	US 11 / NY 41 / NY 281 – Homer, Cortland, Ithaca	NY 41, Cortland and Ithaca not signed northbound
Cortland	Preble	62.89	101.21	13	62	NY 281 – Preble	
Onondaga	Tully	66.62	107.21	14	66	NY 80 – Tully	
Onondaga	LaFayette	73.22	117.84	15	73	US 20 – LaFayette	
Onondaga	Onondaga	78.13	125.74	16	78	US 11 – Onondaga Nation, Nedrow	
Onondaga	Syracuse	0.00	0.00	16A	81	I-81 BL north – Syracuse	No southbound exit; southern terminus of I-81 Bus; exit 1A on I-81 Bus
Onondaga	Syracuse	0.00	0.00	1	81	To I-81 BL north (Brighton Avenue) – Syracuse	Southbound exit
Onondaga	Syracuse	0.86	1.38	1	82	Rock Cut Road	Northbound exit and entrance
Onondaga	DeWitt	3.33	5.36	2	84	Jamesville Road – Jamesville	
Onondaga	DeWitt	5.14	8.27	3	86E-W	NY 5 / NY 92 – Fayetteville, DeWitt	Signed as exits 86A (east) and 86B (west) northbound
Onondaga	DeWitt	6.40	10.30	4	88	I-690 west – Syracuse, Fairgrounds	Left exit northbound; eastern terminus of I-690
Onondaga	DeWitt	8.32	13.39	5	89E-W	Kirkville Road	Signed as exits 89A (east) and 89B (west)
Onondaga	DeWitt	9.45	15.21	6	90	I-90 Toll / New York Thruway – Albany, Buffalo	Exit 34A on I-90 / Thruway
Onondaga	DeWitt	10.20	16.42	7	91	NY 298 – Bridgeport	
Onondaga	Cicero	13.48	21.69	8	93	Northern Boulevard	
Onondaga	Cicero	15.08	24.27	9	94	NY 481 north to I-81 BL south – Oswego, Syracuse	Southern terminus of NY 481 and northern terminus of I-81 Bus; exit 1 on NY 481 and exit 11 on I-81 Bus
Onondaga	Cicero	95.11	153.06	30	95	NY 31 – Cicero, Bridgeport	
Onondaga	Cicero	99.08	159.45	31	99	Bartel Road to US 11 – Brewerton	
Oswego	Hastings	102.93	165.65	32	102	NY 49 – Central Square	
Oswego	Parish	111.19	178.94	33	111	NY 69 – Parish	
Oswego	Parish	114.92	184.95	34	114	NY 104 – Mexico	
Oswego	Richland	118.35	190.47	35	118	Tinker Tavern Road to US 11	
Oswego	Pulaski	121.73	195.91	36	121	NY 13 – Pulaski	Northbound exit and southbound entrance
Oswego	Pulaski	122.54	197.21	36	122	Pulaski	Southbound exit and northbound entrance; access to CR 2
Oswego	Village of Sandy Creek	128.15	206.24	37	128	Sandy Creek, Lacona	Northbound exit and southbound entrance; access to CR 15
Oswego	Village of Sandy Creek	128.31	206.49	37	128	Sandy Creek, Lacona	Southbound exit and northbound entrance; access to CR 22A
Jefferson	Ellisburg	130.85	210.58	38	130	US 11	
Jefferson	Ellisburg	132.89	213.87	39	132	Mannsville	Access to CR 90
Jefferson	Ellisburg	134.74	216.84	40	134	NY 193 – Ellisburg, Pierrepont Manor	
Jefferson	Village of Adams	140.29	225.77	41	140	NY 178 – Adams, Henderson	
Jefferson	Adams	144.41	232.41	42	144	NY 177 – Smithville, Adams Center	
Jefferson	Adams	145.96	234.90	43	145	US 11 – Kellogg Hill	
Jefferson	Town of Watertown	148.34	238.73	44	148	NY 232 – Watertown Center	
Jefferson	Town of Watertown	152.67	245.70	45	152	NY 3 (Arsenal Street) – Sackets Harbor	
Jefferson	Town of Watertown	153.61	247.21	46	153	NY 12F (Coffeen Street) – Airport	Access to Dexter and Cape Vincent
Jefferson	Pamelia	155.12	249.64	47	155	NY 12 (Bradley Street) – Clayton	
Jefferson	Pamelia	157.72	253.83	48	157	NY 342 to NY 37 / NY 3 – Black River, Carthage	
Jefferson	Pamelia	158.41	254.94	48A	158	I-781 east to US 11 – Fort Drum	Exit 1 on I-781
Jefferson	Theresa–Orleans town line	169.25	272.38	49	169	NY 411 – Theresa, LaFargeville	
Jefferson	Alexandria	178.14	286.69	50	178N-S	NY 12 – Alexandria Bay, Clayton	Signed as exits 181A (north) and 181B (south); last northbound exit before toll
Jefferson	Orleans	178.49– 179.22	287.25– 288.43	Thousand Islands Bridge over St. Lawrence River (northbound toll)			
Jefferson	Orleans	179.74	289.26	51	179	Island Road – Island State Parks	
Jefferson	Orleans	183.12	294.70	52	183	Island Road – De Wolf Point	Last exit in the United States
Jefferson	Orleans	183.62	295.51			Highway 137 north to Highway 401 – Kingston, Ottawa	Continuation into Ontario
Jefferson	1.000 mi = 1.609 km; 1.000 km = 0.621 mi: Concurrency terminus; Electronic toll collection; Incomplete access; Route transition						

== See also ==
Interstate 81
Previous state: Pennsylvania	New York	Next state: Terminus
