= Henderson (CDP), New York =

Henderson, New York
- Census-designated place
- Location within New York Location within the United States
- Coordinates: 43°50′45″N 76°10′52″W
- Country: United States
- State: New York
- County: Jefferson
- Town: Henderson

Area
  - Total: 0.53 sq mi (1.36 km^{2})
  - Land: 0.53 sq mi (1.36 km^{2})
  - Water: 0 sq mi (0.00 km^{2})
- Elevation: 325 ft (99 m)

Population (2020)
  - Total: 233
  - Density: 443.7/sq mi (171.32/km^{2})
- Time zone: UTC-5 (Eastern (EST))
  - Summer (DST): UTC-4 (EDT)
- ZIP code: 13650
- Area code: 315
- FIPS code: 36-34044
- GNIS feature ID: 0952585

Henderson is a hamlet and census-designated place (CDP) in the town of Henderson, Jefferson County, New York, United States. The population of the CDP was 224 at the 2010 census, out of 1,360 in the entire town of Henderson.

== Geography ==
The hamlet of Henderson is located in southwestern Jefferson County, in the center of the town of Henderson. The community is in the valley of Stony Creek, a southwestward-flowing tributary of Lake Ontario. New York State Route 178 runs through the center of the community, leading west 1 mile (1.6 km) to New York State Route 3 and southeast 9 miles (14 km) to Adams. Henderson Harbor on Lake Ontario is 1.7 miles (2.7 km) to the northwest via County Route 72.

According to the United States Census Bureau, the Henderson CDP has a total area of 0.51 square miles (1.31 km^{2}), all land.

== Demographics ==
Historical population
Census	Pop.	Note	%±
2020	233		—
U.S. Decennial Census

== Education ==
The school district is the Belleville Henderson Central School District.
