= Estelle Mendell Amory =

American educator and author (1846–1923)

- Born: Estelle Bradshaw Mendell; June 3, 1846; Ellisburg, New York, U.S.
- Died: June 3, 1923 (aged 77); Pasadena, California, U.S.
- Education: Hungerford Collegiate Institute; Falley Seminary
- Occupations: author; educator
- Spouse: James Henry Amor (m. 1875; died 1899)
- Children: 3
- Writing career
- Language: English
- Genres: short stories; juvenile literature; essays; poems
- Subject: domestic articles
- Notable works: "Aunt Martha Letters", "Aunt Chatty" series

Estelle Mendell Amory (née Mendell; June 3, 1846 – June 3, 1923) was an American educator and author. She is better known as a writer by her maiden name, Estelle Mendell. She published a variety of domestic articles, short stories for children, essays on living themes, and occasional poems.

== Early life and education ==
Estelle B. Mendell was born in Ellisburg, New York, June 3, 1846. Her childhood was passed on a farm. In 1852, her family moved to Adams, a nearby village, where her father, Col. S. J. Mendell, engaged in mercantile business. In 1845, he married Mary J. Porter. They had twelve children.

The family home was a place of refinement and culture where the Mendells entertained many prominent persons, among whom were Henry Ward Beecher, Thomas Starr King, Edwin Hubbell Chapin, Frederick Douglass, and Gerrit Smith. These encounters inspired the young girl to become a writer. When the American Civil War broke out, Mr. Mendell raised a company of soldiers, took a commission as captain and went to the South. He served throughout the war, rising to the rank of colonel by brevet. Estelle Mendell studied in the Hungerford Collegiate Institute in her home town, and in Falley Seminary, Fulton, New York.

== Career ==
Amory started working as a teacher. In 1866, her family moved to Franklin County, Iowa. She continued to teach there. In 1867, she returned to the East and re-entered Falley Seminary, where she graduated with honors in 1868. Her family -eight brothers and sisters— suffered financial difficulties from the war. She was aided by friends to complete her seminary course. After teaching for seven years, she worked as a governess in a family in Chicago, and principal and preceptress of seminaries in the East.

On January 18, 1875, in Otisville (now Dows), Wright County, Iowa, she married James Henry Amory (1838–1899), from Binghamton, New York. They settled in Elgin, Illinois. During all those years, Amory wrote much but published little. She gradually had work accepted and soon, she became a regular contributor to standard periodicals.

She wrote mainly domestic articles, short stories for children, essays on living themes, and occasional poems. Her well-known "Aunt Martha Letters", were published in the Elmira Telegram, in 1882. Her more notable "Aunt Chatty" series, published in the Minneapolis Housekeeper, brought her recognition. She contributed to the Ladies' Home Journal, Mail and Express, Epoch, Cincinnati Enquirer, Journalist, Union Signal, Babyhood, Golden Days, and many others. In addition, Amory often held classes at home and in the schoolroom, including classes in music.

== Personal life ==
She and her husband had three children together, Carrie, Rufus, and Mary. They lived in Belmond, Iowa.

Estelle Mendell Amory died Pasadena, California on June 3, 1923, her 77th birthday.
