= Amos Wood House =

Historic house in New York, United States

- U.S. National Register of Historic Places
- Location within New York Location within the United States
- Location: 7751 County Road 120, North Landing vicinity, Ellisburg, New York
- Coordinates: 43°44′28″N 76°10′51″W
- Area: 18.55 acres (7.51 ha)
- Built: 1826, c. 1885, 1939
- NRHP reference No.: 11001000
- Added to NRHP: January 4, 2012

Amos Wood House is a historic home located near North Landing, Ellisburg in Jefferson County, New York. The house was built in 1826, and consists of three sections: the main block, ell, and service addition. The limestone main block is a 1 1/2-story, five bay structure. The one-story limestone ell has a frame upper structure. The two-story frame service addition is attached to the ell. Also on the property is a contributing late-19th century sugar house and early-20th century chicken coop.

It was added to the National Register of Historic Places in 2012.
