= Pierrepont Manor Complex =

- U.S. National Register of Historic Places
- U.S. Historic district
- Location within New York Location within the United States
- Nearest city: Mannsville, New York
- Coordinates: 43°44′4″N 76°3′42″W
- Area: 9 acres (3.6 ha)
- Built: 1822
- Architect: Pierrepont, William Constable
- Architectural style: Queen Anne, Federal
- NRHP reference No.: 77000943
- Added to NRHP: September 15, 1977

Pierrepont Manor Complex is a national historic district located at Mannsville in Jefferson County, New York. The district includes five contributing buildings. They are the manor house (1826), carriage barn (1826), land office (1822), Zion Episcopal Church (1836) and its parish house and school (1856). The manor house is operated as a full-service wedding facility.

It was listed on the National Register of Historic Places in 1977.
