= Marietta Holley =

American novelist (1836–1926)

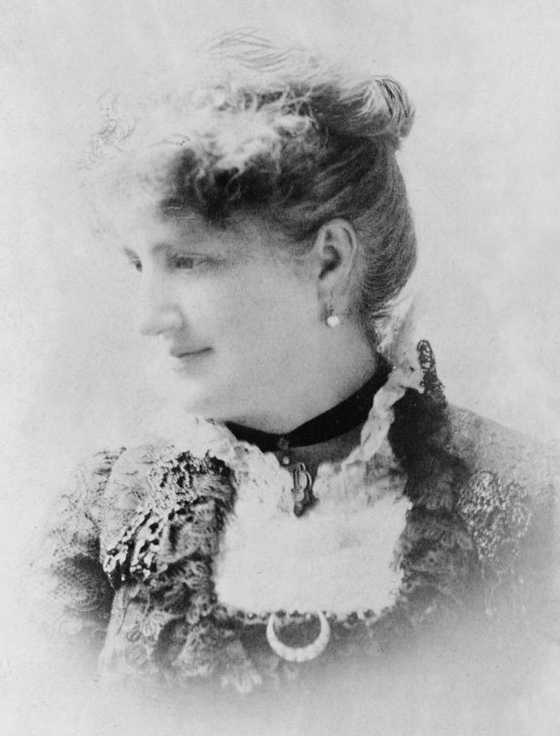
- Born: July 16, 1836; Ellisburg, New York, U.S.
- Died: March 1, 1926 (aged 89); Jefferson County, New York, U.S.
- Occupation: Novelist
- Writing career
- Pen name: Jemyma, Josiah Allen's Wife
- Language: English
- Genre: American humorist

Marietta Holley (pen names, Jemyma, later, Josiah Allen's Wife; July 16, 1836 – March 1, 1926), was an American humorist who used satire to comment on U.S. society and politics. Holley enjoyed a prolific writing career and was a bestselling author in the late 19th century, though she was largely forgotten by the time of her death. Her writing was frequently compared to that of Mark Twain and Edgar Nye. Along with Frances Miriam Whitcher and Ann S. Stephens, Holley is regarded as one of America's most significant early female humorists. Her work appealed to all classes of society. Her readers were scattered over the entire world, and included men and women of every station and grade. Her books were widely read in Europe.

== Early years and education ==
Holley was born in a modest cottage in Ellisburg, New York, on the outskirts of Adams, New York, July 16, 1836. She was the youngest of Mary Taber and John Milton Holley's seven children. The family lived on a small farm in Jefferson County, New York, on the road leading from Adams to Pierrepont Manor. The Holleys went to Jefferson county from Connecticut. Her maternal grandfather, "Old Squire Taber" as he was called, went to Pierrepont Manor from Rhode Island.

She received the rudiments of an English education at a neighboring school, and later, with the exception of teachers in music and French, she pursued her studies at home. At fourteen, she ended her formal education in order to supplement the family income by giving piano lessons. When she was a young girl she was given to poetry, and wrote a great deal. She thought she should like to become a great painter; then she decided to be a poet, but finally abandoned both intentions. Holley commenced her career as a writer when in her teens, though she published nothing until 1876.

== Career ==
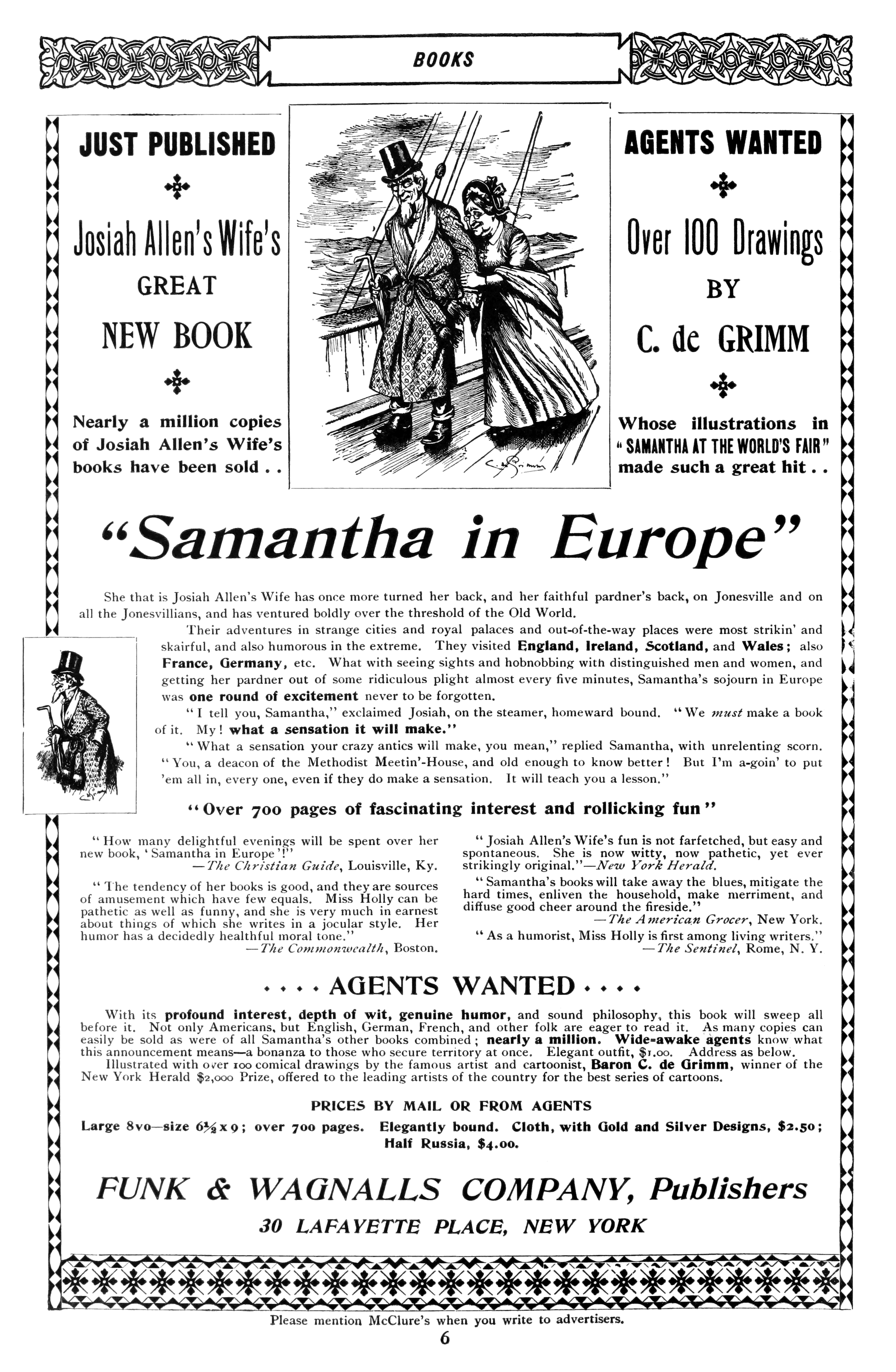
Advertisement in the Jan, 1896 issue of McClure's Magazine for Samantha in Europe

At the age of seventeen, she converted to the Baptist faith and joined the Adams Village Baptist Church. Her father died when she was 25, and Holley took charge of the farm and care of her sick mother and sister.

Her first appearance in print was in a newspaper published in the Adams Journal. Her first pen-name was "Jemyma". The editor of that paper encouraged the young aspirant with some timely praise, as did Charles J. Peterson, for whom she wrote later. The editors of the Christian Union published what they called "a sweet little poem" from her pen. She wrote also for the Independent and several other weekly and monthly journals. Her articles at that time were mostly poems, and were widely copied in the United States and in Europe.

It was in a dialect sketch written for Peterson's Magazine that she first adopted the pen-name "Josiah Allen's Wife". That pen name and "Jemyma" were a protest against the too musical pen-names of literary aspirants. Those articles attracted the attention of Elijah Bliss, president of the American Publishing Company, of Hartford, Connecticut. Against the protest of his company, he brought out Holley's work. He urged her to write a book for him, which she did, and it was an immediate success, and was republished at once in England and Canada. The name of the book was My Opinions and Betsy Bobbet's (Hartford, 1872).

Her next book, Samantha at the Centennial, appeared in 1877, and at once pleased the popular taste. The Wayward Pardner appeared in 1880. Miss Richard's Boy, a book of stories not in dialect, was published in 1882. These books were brought out by the American Publishing Company, and the same firm published an illustrated poem of hers called The Mormon Wife. Holley's follow-up prose work, Sweet Cicely, (New York, 1885) was wrought out through her horror of intemperance and her desire to see the young of her country saved from the evils of strong drink. This was followed by Samantha at Saratoga (Philadelphia, 1887). Poems (New York, 1887), revealed strength and tenderness, but failed to suit the popular taste because they were wanting in the grotesque humor and pathetic homeliness of style which characterized her prose works. Samantha Amongst the Brethern, appeared in 1891.

After Holley became a successful novelist, she built a mansion called "Bonnie View" near her family's home in Pierrepont. She wrote over 25 books, including one collection of poems, two dramas and one long poem, between 1873 and 1914. Among her novels was a 10-book series that detailed the travels and married life of Samantha and Josiah Allen as they journey outside Samantha's rural hometown, which was similar to Holley's own. Holley herself spent most of her life close to her family's farm; aside from Saratoga and Coney Island, she never actually visited the places to which she sent her fictional protagonists; she instead depended on maps, guidebooks, and descriptions for the necessary details.

Her books were translated into other languages and brought her a comfortable income. Many contemporary writers and suffragists held her in high regard; her famous friends included Susan B. Anthony, Twain, and Clara Barton. Anthony frequently asked Holley to give speeches at suffrage conventions because of Holley's support of women's suffrage, but she refused public appearances.

== Themes and style ==
Many of Holley's writings share themes of prohibition and women's rights. Like Charles Dickens, she brought to her aid the very people whose sufferings she aimed to relieve, and whose evil deeds she hoped to check. She was not only quaint in expression but magnetic, and her sentiments were often touchingly and pathetically strong.

Quaint, grotesque humor and pathetic homeliness of speech were the weapons she used to make known the wrongs of her sex and the evils of the times. In her prose work, she mostly employed the speech of half-taught people, writing of their ludicrous blunders, and turning ridicule against ancient wrongs, venerated because they are ancient. Every one laughs at the absurdities of Josiah Allen's Wife, and no one forgets the crushing exposures of fraud and oppression which she makes.

== Personal life ==
Holley never married. A maiden sister resided with her. Holley died March 1, 1926, at age 89.

== Selected works ==
- My Opinions and Betsey Bobbet's: Designed as a Beacon Light, To guide Women to Life Liberty and the Pursuit of Happiness, But which May Be read by Members of the Sterner Sect, Without Injury to Themselves or The Book. Josiah Allen's Wife. Hartford Conn., : American Publishing Company, 1873, c. 1872
- Josiah Allen’s Wife as a P.A. and P.I.: Designed as a Bright and Shining Light, To Pierce the Fogs of Error and Injustice That Surround Society and Josiah, And to Bring More Clearly to View the Path That Leads Straight on to Virtue and Happiness. Josiah Allen's Wife. Hartford, Conn.: American Publishing Company, c. 1877
- Betsey Bobbet: A Drama. Adams, N.Y.: W. J. Allen, 1880
- The Lament of the Mormon Wife. Josiah Allen's Wife. Hartford, Conn. : American Publishing Company, 1880
- My Wayward Pardner; or, My Trials with Josiah, America, the Widow Bump, and Etcetery. Josiah Allen's Wife. Hartford Conn., American Publishing Company, 1880
- Miss Richard’s Boy and Other Stories. Hartford, Ct.: American Publishing, 1883
- Sweet Cicely: Josiah Allen as a Politician. New York: Funk and Wagnalls, 1885
- Miss Jones' Quilting and Other Stories. New York: J.S. Ogilvie, 1887
- Poems. New York: Funk and Wagnalls, 1887
- Samantha at Saratoga or Flirtin’ with Fashion. Philadelphia: Hubbard Brothers, 1887
- Samantha Among the Brethren. New York: Funk and Wagnalls, 1890
- Samantha on the Race Problem. New York: Dodd, Mead, 1892; republished 1898 as Samantha Among the Colored Folks
- Tirzah Ann's Summer Trip and Other Sketches. New York: F. M. Lupton, 1892 (Gutenberg}
- Samantha at the World's Fair. New York: Funk and Wagnalls, 1893
- Widder Doodle's Love Affair and Other Stories. New York: F. M. Lupton, 1893
- Josiah's Alarm and Abel Perry’s Funeral. Philadelphia: Lippincott, 1895
- Samantha in Europe. New York: Funk and Wagnalls, 1895
- Samantha at the St. Louis Exposition. New York: G. W. Dillingham, 1904
- Around the World With Josiah Allen’s Wife. New York: G. W. Dillingham, 1905
- Samantha Vs. Josiah: Being the Story of the Borrowed Automobile and What Became of It. New York: Funk and Wagnalls, 1906
- Samantha on Children’s Rights. New York: G. W. Dillingham, 1909
- Josiah's Secret. Watertown, N.Y.: Hungerford-Holbrook, 1910
- How I Wrote My First Books. Harper’s Bazaar (September 1911)
- Samantha at Coney Island and a Thousand Other Islands. New York: Christian Herald, 1911
- Samantha on the Woman Question. New York: Fleming H. Revell, 1913
- Josiah Allen on the Woman Question. New York: Fleming H. Revell, 1914
- What Is Behind Ouija? The World Magazine (27 June 1920): 5,13
- The Story of My Life, Published serially. Watertown Daily Times, Watertown, N.Y., 5 February to 9 April 1931
