= Belleville, New York =

- Census-designated place
- Location within New York Location within the United States
- Coordinates: 43°47′00″N 76°07′10″W
- Country: United States
- State: New York
- County: Jefferson
- Town: Ellisburg

Area
  - Total: 0.68 sq mi (1.75 km^{2})
  - Land: 0.66 sq mi (1.70 km^{2})
  - Water: 0.015 sq mi (0.04 km^{2})
- Elevation: 459 ft (140 m)

Population (2020)
  - Total: 233
  - Density: 354.3/sq mi (136.81/km^{2})
- Time zone: UTC-5 (Eastern (EST))
  - Summer (DST): UTC-4 (EDT)
- ZIP Codes: 13611 (Belleville); 13605 (Adams)
- Area code: 315
- GNIS feature ID: 943612
- FIPS code: 36-05683

Belleville is a hamlet and census-designated place (CDP) in the town of Ellisburg, Jefferson County, New York, United States. As of the 2020 census, Belleville had a population of 233.

It was an incorporated village from 1860 to 1930.

== Geography ==
Belleville is in southern Jefferson County, in the northern part of the town of Ellisburg. The community sits on both sides of Sandy Creek, a southwesterly-flowing direct tributary of Lake Ontario. The main crossroads in the hamlet is on the north side of the creek. New York State Route 289 leads south 3.5 miles (5.6 km) to the village of Ellisburg and northeast (upstream) 2 miles (3 km) to New York State Route 178. County Route 75 runs north and southwest from the Belleville crossroads.

According to the U.S. Census Bureau, the Belleville CDP has an area of 0.26 square miles (0.68 km^{2}), all land.

== Demographics ==
Historical population
Census	Pop.	Note	%±
2020	233		—
U.S. Decennial Census

== Education ==
The school district is the Belleville Henderson Central School District.
