= Pierrepont Manor, New York =

- Census-designated place
- Location within New York Location within the United States
- Coordinates: 43°44′06″N 76°03′32″W
- Country: United States
- State: New York
- County: Jefferson
- Town: Ellisburg

Area
  - Total: 0.78 sq mi (2.01 km^{2})
  - Land: 0.77 sq mi (2.00 km^{2})
  - Water: 0.0039 sq mi (0.01 km^{2})
- Elevation: 623 ft (190 m)

Population (2020)
  - Total: 212
  - Density: 274/sq mi (105.8/km^{2})
- Time zone: UTC-5 (Eastern (EST))
  - Summer (DST): UTC-4 (EDT)
- ZIP Codes: 13674 (Pierrepont Manor); 13605 (Adams); 13661 (Mannsville)
- Area codes: 315 & 680
- GNIS feature ID: 960363

Pierrepont Manor is a hamlet and census-designated place (CDP) in Jefferson County, New York, United States. As of the 2020 census, Pierrepont Manor had a population of 212. Pierrepont Manor has a post office with ZIP code 13674, which opened on November 29, 1843. U.S. Route 11 and New York State Route 193 intersect in the community; it is also served by an exit on Interstate 81 .

== Geography ==
According to the U.S. Census Bureau, the community has an area of 0.688 square miles (1.78 km^{2}); 0.684 square miles (1.77 km^{2}) is land and 0.004 square miles (0.010 km^{2}) is water.

== Demographics ==
Historical population
Census	Pop.	Note	%±
2020	212		—
U.S. Decennial Census

== Education ==
The school district is the South Jefferson Central School District.
