= Woodville, Jefferson County, New York =

Woodville, New York
- Hamlet
- Location within New York Location within the United States
- Coordinates: 43°45′16″N 76°09′55″W
- Country: United States
- State: New York
- County: Jefferson
- Town: Ellisburg
- Elevation: 318 ft (97 m)
- Time zone: UTC-5 (Eastern (EST))
  - Summer (DST): UTC-4 (EDT)
- Area code: 315
- GNIS feature ID: 971726

Woodville is a hamlet in the town of Ellisburg, Jefferson County, New York, United States.

== History ==
The village of Woodville, St. Croix County, Wisconsin, was named after the hamlet.
