= Ellisburg, New York =

- Town
- Location within New York Location within the United States
- Coordinates: 43°44′N 76°08′W
- Country: United States
- State: New York
- County: Jefferson

Government
  - Type: Town Council
  - Town Supervisor: Douglas Shelmidine (R)
  - Town Council: Members: • Henry M. Colby (R); • Kurt E. Gehrke (R); • Frederick P. Goodnough (R); • Douglas Shelmidine (R)

Area
  - Total: 86.61 sq mi (224.32 km^{2})
  - Land: 85.22 sq mi (220.72 km^{2})
  - Water: 1.39 sq mi (3.60 km^{2}) 1.60%

Population (2020)
  - Total: 3,352
  - Density: 39.3/sq mi (15.19/km^{2})
- Time zone: UTC-5 (Eastern (EST))
  - Summer (DST): UTC-4 (EDT)
- ZIP Codes: 13636 (Ellisburg); 13611 (Belleville); 13661 (Mannsville); 13674 (Pierrepont Manor); 13605 (Adams); 13650 (Henderson); 13083 (Lacona)
- FIPS code: 36-045-24086
- Website: https://www.townofellisburgny.gov/

Ellisburg is an incorporated town in Jefferson County, New York. The population was 3,352 at the time of the 2020 census. The town is in the southwestern corner of the county and is south of Watertown. Ellisburg is named after early European-American landowners. Among the villages in the town is Ellisburg.

== History ==
This was long the territory of various cultures of indigenous peoples. Prehistoric remains show evidence of indigenous occupation for thousands of years prior to European encounter. The St. Lawrence Iroquoians had villages along the upper St. Lawrence River from the 1300s into the late 1500s. Along the southern areas of the Great Lakes, the Five Nations of the Iroquois Confederacy controlled territory from present-day New York into Pennsylvania and Ohio and south into Virginia. In historic times the Onondaga people were concentrated in this area. The Five Nations together identified as the Haudenosaunee.

In the mid-19th century, E.G. Squier conducted a survey of ancient Native American works for the Smithsonian Institution, publishing drawings, plans, and maps. He found evidence of Iroquois longhouses and burial grounds in this area, as well as numerous artifacts and remnants of what were believed to be defensive Iroquois fortifications along Sandy Creek from the early eighteenth century, for protection against French colonists and First Nations.

Samuel de Champlain and other French explorers and missionaries visited the area of the present-day town in the 17th century. After the French established a colony in New France (Quebec), their traders did business with numerous Iroquois villages, primarily those of the Onondaga and especially the Mohawk peoples. Later these peoples primarily traded with Dutch and English colonists in present-day New York, from Albany west along the Mohawk River. Most of the Iroquois nations allied with the British during the American Revolutionary War. As a result of Great Britain's defeat in the American Revolutionary War and cession of its territories in the Thirteen Colonies, the United States forced the Iroquois to cede most of their territory in present-day New York. The Crown compensated the nations by setting up land reserves in Upper Canada (now Ontario). There were already Mohawk-dominated villages along the St. Lawrence River in Quebec, near Montreal and upriver, which had started near Jesuit missions.

Following the war, New York State made five million acres of former Iroquois land available for public purchase; land speculators bought large tracts of land for development. They envisioned the rise of villages and farms. As part of such postwar land speculation, Alexander Macomb bought thousands of acres in Macomb's Purchase. Thousands of migrants from New England flooded into upstate and western New York in the postwar years, and the area also attracted immigrants from the British Isles and France. Marvel and Lyman Ellis purchased the town land from Macomb's Purchase and first settled around 1797 near what became Ellisburg village. Originally the name was spelled "Ellisburgh".

The town was organized in 1803 from the town of Mexico (now in Oswego County) before the formation of Jefferson County.

When President Thomas Jefferson established an embargo against trade with Great Britain in 1807 prior to the War of 1812, it adversely affected the thriving trade among the towns in upstate New York and Canada. In the tiny village of nearby Sackets Harbor on Lake Ontario, the US Navy built and operated a major shipyard employing 3,000 workers during the war; they completed 12 warships to be used for the battles on the Great Lakes and were critical to the US being able to fight against the British there. Thousands more military assigned to the Army and Navy were stationed at Sackets Harbor. By the fall of 1814, the village had become the third-largest population center in the entire state, after Albany and New York. In 1814 during the War of 1812, Americans defeated a British invasion force at the Battle of Big Sandy Creek in Ellisburg.

Settlers and developers had expected upstate New York to thrive due to trade with Canada, but this was severely interrupted by the war. Following the war, major changes followed the construction and opening of the Erie Canal in 1824 through the Mohawk River Valley and it drew development westward. It opened transportation and connection with the Midwest and Great Lakes communities, which could send their produce and commodities to New York City. Towns of Jefferson County generally were bypassed by such western development, resulting in many of their young people migrating west to Ohio, Michigan and Wisconsin from the mid-nineteenth century.

Watertown, New York, however, developed as a major industrial city at the turn of the twentieth century. Its paper and other factories were powered by the Black River. The industrial wealth generated by such manufacturing resulted in the city having one of the highest numbers of millionaires per capita in the early 20th century.

The community of Belleville incorporated as a village in 1860. The community of Mannsville was incorporated as a village in 1879. Ellisburg village was incorporated in 1895. In 1930, Belleville abandoned its status as a village.

== Geography ==
According to the United States Census Bureau, the town has a total area of 86.6 square miles (224.3 km^{2}), of which 85.2 square miles (220.7 km^{2}) are land and 1.4 square miles (3.6 km^{2}), or 1.60%, are water. The western boundary of Ellisburg is Lake Ontario, and the southern town line is the border of Oswego County.

Interstate 81 passes through the eastern side of the town. U.S. Route 11 runs parallel to and just east of the interstate. New York State Route 3, a north-south highway, runs down the western side of Ellisburg. New York State Route 193, an east-west highway, intersects north-south highway New York State Route 289 at Ellisburg village.

== Demographics ==
Historical population
Census	Pop.	Note	%±
1820	3,531		—
1830	5,292		49.9%
1840	5,349		1.1%
1850	5,524		3.3%
1860	5,614		1.6%
1870	4,822		−14.1%
1880	4,810		−0.2%
1890	4,145		−13.8%
1900	3,888		−6.2%
1910	3,634		−6.5%
1920	3,192		−12.2%
1930	3,026		−5.2%
1940	3,183		5.2%
1950	3,116		−2.1%
1960	3,285		5.4%
1970	3,385		3.0%
1980	3,312		−2.2%
1990	3,386		2.2%
2000	3,541		4.6%
2010	3,474		−1.9%
2020	3,352		−3.5%
U.S. Decennial Census

As of the census of 2000, there were 3,541 people, 1,269 households, and 961 families residing in the town. The population density was 41.5 inhabitants per square mile (16.0/km^{2}). There were 1,781 housing units at an average density of 20.9 per square mile (8.1/km^{2}). The racial makeup of the town was 97.85% White, 0.40% Black or African American, 0.48% Native American, 0.37% Asian, 0.03% Pacific Islander, 0.37% from other races, and 0.51% from two or more races. Hispanic or Latino of any race were 1.04% of the population.

There were 1,269 households, out of which 38.5% had children under the age of 18 living with them, 62.3% were married couples living together, 8.4% had a female householder with no husband present, and 24.2% were non-families. 19.0% of all households were made up of individuals, and 9.0% had someone living alone who was 65 years of age or older. The average household size was 2.77 and the average family size was 3.16.

In the town, the population was spread out, with 29.5% under the age of 18, 7.2% from 18 to 24, 29.6% from 25 to 44, 21.4% from 45 to 64, and 12.4% who were 65 years of age or older. The median age was 36 years. For every 100 females, there were 99.3 males. For every 100 females age 18 and over, there were 98.3 males.

The median income for a household in the town was $38,112, and the median income for a family was $40,903. Males had a median income of $31,184 versus $23,162 for females. The per capita income for the town was $17,102. About 10.9% of families and 13.6% of the population were below the poverty line, including 21.3% of those under age 18 and 6.7% of those age 65 or over.

== Communities and locations in Ellisburg ==
- Belleville – a hamlet and census-designated place in the north part of the town on NY-289 at County Road 75, next to Sandy Creek; formerly an incorporated village.
- Cobbtown – a location southeast of Pierpont Manor.
- Cobblestone Corners – a location in the southern part of the town at the junction of County Roads 87 and 89.
- Ellisburg – a village near the center of the town, served by NY-289.
- Giddingsville – a hamlet on U.S. Route 11 in the northeastern part of the town by Sandy Creek.
- Hammond Corners – a location at the junction of County Roads 75 and 78, north of Woodville.
- Hossington – a hamlet near the northern town line on County Road 91.
- Jefferson Park – a lakeside hamlet northwest of Ellisburg village.
- Mannsville – a village in the southeastern part of the town on US-11 at County Road 90.
- Montario Point – a lakeside hamlet in the southwestern corner of the town.
- North Landing – a hamlet on NY-3 west of Ellisburg village. The Amos Wood House was added to the National Register of Historic Places in 2012.
- Pierrepont Manor – a hamlet and census-designated place east of Ellisburg village on US-11, first settled circa 1805; birthplace of baseball player Frank Smith.
- Rural Hill – a location in the northwest part of the town on County Road 79, named after early settlers, the Hill brothers; once known as "Buck Hill".
- Saxe Corner – a hamlet northeast of Ellisburg village.
- South Landing – a hamlet southwest of Ellisburg village on NY-3.
- Taylor Settlement – a location in the northeastern part of the town on County Road 91.
- Wardwell Settlement (or Wardwell) – a hamlet in the northeastern part of the town at County Roads 85 and 91, named after early landowner Colonel Wardwell.
- Woodville – a hamlet northwest of Ellisburg village and located on the north branch of Sandy Creek; the community was originally called "Wood's Settlement" after an early pioneer family.

=== Geographical locations ===
- Black Pond Wildlife Management Area – A conservation area located by Lake Ontario in the northwestern corner of Ellisburg.
- Colwell Hill – An elevation in the southwestern part of Ellisburg near Montario Point.
- Floodwood Pond – A small lake near the shore of Lake Ontario.
- Goose Pond – A small lake near the shore of Lake Ontario.
- Lakeview Pond – A small lake by the shore of Lake Ontario.
- Lakeview Wildlife Management Area – A conservation area located by Lake Ontario at the western edge of Ellisburg.
- North Colwell Pond – A small lake by the shore of Lake Ontario.
- Sandy Creek – A stream flowing southwest through the town past Belleville, Hossington, and Woodville.
- South Colwell Pond – A small lake by the shore of Lake Ontario.
- Southwick Beach State Park – A state park on the shore of Lake Ontario, located northwest of Ellisburg village.

== Notable people ==
- Estelle Mendell Amory (born 1845), educator and author
- La Fayette Eastman, pioneer settler of Plymouth, Wisconsin and member of the Wisconsin State Assembly
- Marietta Holley (1836–1926), novelist and humorist
