= New York State Route 178 =

State highway in Jefferson County, New York, US

New York State Route 178
- Map of southern Jefferson County with NY 178 highlighted in red

Route information
- Maintained by NYSDOT
- Length: 10.23 mi (16.46 km)
- Existed: 1930–present

Major junctions
- West end: NY 3 in Henderson
- I-81 in Adams
- East end: US 11 in Adams

Location
- Country: United States
- State: New York
- Counties: Jefferson

Highway system
- New York Highways; Interstate; US; State; Reference; Parkways
← NY 177	→ NY 179

New York State Route 178 (NY 178) is an east–west state highway in Jefferson County, New York, in the United States. It extends for 10.23 miles (16.46 km) from an intersection with NY 3 by Aspinwell Corners in the town of Henderson to a junction with U.S. Route 11 (US 11) in the village of Adams. NY 178 meets Interstate 81 (I-81) at exit 41 0.5 miles (0.8 km) west of its junction with US 11. When NY 178 was assigned in the 1930 renumbering of state highways in New York, it continued east along modern County Route 189 (CR 189) to NY 177 in Rodman. This extension was eliminated in 1979. From the early 1930s to the late 1960s, NY 178 also continued west toward Lake Ontario on what is now County Route 178.

== Route description ==
NY 178 continues eastward from NY 3, passing through a small populated region before entering the hamlet of Henderson. There, the route intersects with the southern terminus of CR 72 (Penney Road). NY 178 turns to the south along CR 72's right-of-way (now with the moniker of Adams Road), turns to the southeast, and leaves the hamlet of Henderson. After intersecting with Town Barn Road, the highway continues southeastward, passing Henderson Pond and curving to the east at an intersection with CR 78 (Clark Road). NY 178 curves back to the southeast and intersects with CR 152 (Smith Road), where the right-of-ways merge. From there, NY 178 begins an eastward progression through the North Country, entering the community of Roberts Corner at an intersection with CR 75 (Butterville Road). After crossing through the rural community, the highway turns to the southeast and intersects with the northern terminus of NY 289 in the community of Taylor Settlement.

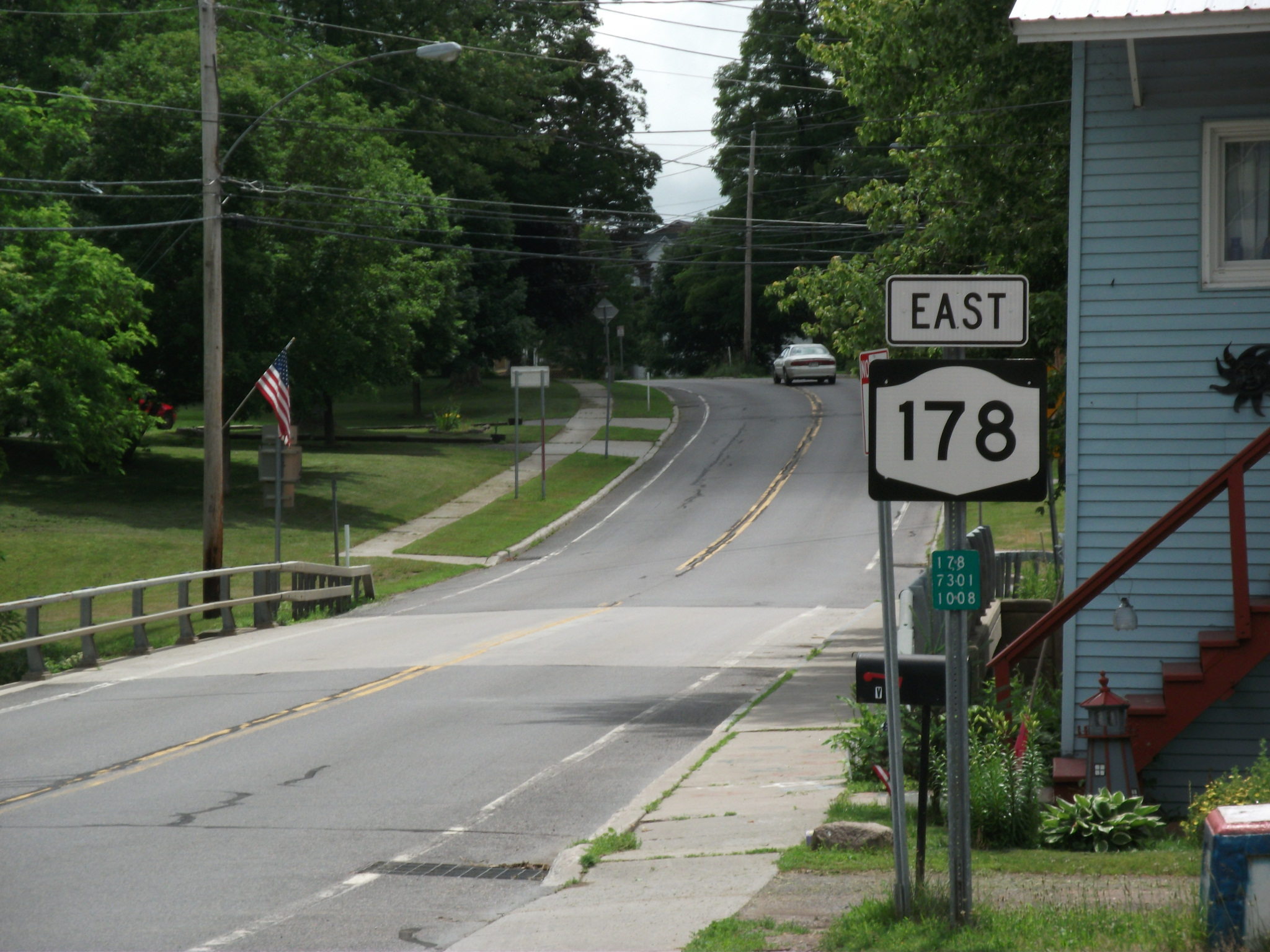
NY 178 heading eastbound through Henderson

After intersecting with NY 289, NY 178 progresses northeastward, intersecting with the western terminus of CR 84 in the community of Thomas Settlement. After leaving Thomas Settlement, NY 178 intersects with CR 77 and turning to the southeast through a rural region before entering the village of Adams at an intersection with Cobbville Road. There, the surroundings become further residential, before the highway connects to I-81 at exit 41. After the interchange, NY 178 becomes known as Church Street West, crosses over a railroad line and enters the downtown portion of Adams. After the intersection with Clay Street, NY 178 intersects with US 11 (Main Street), where the NY 178 designation ends. The right-of-way continues eastward as Church Street East, which becomes CR 69 at the east village line.

== History ==
When NY 178 was assigned as part of the 1930 renumbering of state highways in New York, it began at NY 3C (later NY 3) south of the hamlet (then village) of Henderson and ended at NY 177 west of Barnes Corners. In between, NY 178 passed through the village of Adams, where it had a short overlap with US 11. NY 178 was extended northwestward c. 1932 along then-NY 3D and Military Road to a new terminus at Snowshoe Road northwest of Henderson. By the following year, NY 3D was moved onto the current alignment of NY 3 in the vicinity of Henderson, eliminating its overlap with NY 178.

NY 178 was truncated eastward in the late 1960s to begin at NY 3 west of Henderson. It was truncated westward to US 11 in Adams on August 1, 1979, after ownership and maintenance of NY 178 between US 11 and NY 177 was transferred from the state of New York to Jefferson County as part of a highway maintenance swap between the two levels of government. The former routing of NY 178 between Snowshoe Road and NY 3 in the town of Henderson is now maintained by Jefferson County as CR 178 while the section of old NY 178 from US 11 to NY 177 is designated as CR 189.

== Major intersections ==
The entire route is in Jefferson County.

Location	mi	km	Destinations	Notes
Henderson	0.00	0.00	NY 3 – Mexico, Watertown	Western terminus
Town of Adams	6.53	10.51	NY 289 south – Belleville	Northern terminus of NY 289
Village of Adams	9.67	15.56	I-81	Exit 143 (I-81)
Village of Adams	10.23	16.46	US 11	Eastern terminus
1.000 mi = 1.609 km; 1.000 km = 0.621 mi

== See also ==
- List of county routes in Jefferson County, New York
