= Mannsville, New York =

- Village
- Location within New York Location within the United States
- Coordinates: 43°42′41″N 76°3′51″W
- Country: United States
- State: New York
- County: Jefferson
- Town: Ellisburg

Area
  - Total: 0.93 sq mi (2.41 km^{2})
  - Land: 0.90 sq mi (2.32 km^{2})
  - Water: 0.031 sq mi (0.08 km^{2})
- Elevation: 620 ft (189 m)

Population (2020)
  - Total: 297
  - Density: 331.0/sq mi (127.81/km^{2})
- Time zone: UTC-5 (Eastern (EST))
  - Summer (DST): UTC-4 (EDT)
- ZIP Code: 13661
- Area code: 315
- FIPS code: 36-45073
- GNIS feature ID: 0956371
- Website: https://www.villageofmannsville.com/

Mannsville is a village in the town of Ellisburg in Jefferson County, New York, United States. As of the 2020 census, Mannsville had a population of 297. The name is from Barzillian Mann, early developer.

Mannsville is in the southeastern part of Ellisburg and is south of Watertown.

== History ==
The community was first settled around 1801. Mannsville incorporated as a village in 1879. In 1885, a fire burned several structures in the small village, but they were soon rebuilt.

In the 1830s missionaries served the area. The Mannsville Methodist-Episcopal Church was organized in 1847 with Rev. Fuller serving as the first pastor. The building was erected in 1859. The parsonage, located three houses east, was built in 1880. In 1957 a large addition was built, and the sanctuary was remodeled in 1967. A new steeple was erected in 2002 with funds provided by Ethel S. Joyner, and work done by Graves Construction.

The first school building in the community was a little red schoolhouse built in 1826, at the intersection of Balch Place and current Route 11. A second larger two-story building was built on Lorraine Street, but burned in 1878. The third school, built on the foundation of the Lorraine street building, burned in January 1883. A new building was dedicated in September 1883. There were 106 students in three departments. The schoolhouse again burned in 1907. A new two-story building was completed in 1908, and is currently known as the Mannsville Manor Elementary School. The cement blocks were made to resemble stone. O.D. Greene Jr. of Adams was the builder. Classes ran from first to eighth grades. The district centralized in 1930 with other districts in the towns of Ellisburg and Lorraine.

In the early 1930s, six village men held a meeting in the old Club House on Mill Street in Mannsville. With a dollar each, the Mannsville Volunteer Fire Department was established. In 1949 they became incorporated and merged with Pierrepont Manor to become the Mannsville Manor Fire Department, or tongue in cheek as the "Cellar Savers".

In May 1960 seven active members of the Mannsville Manor Fire Department borrowed $200 from the department to start the first ambulance service in southern Jefferson County, which at that time served six townships. This was the beginning of Rescue 48. In May 1976, Rescue 48 was reorganized with 25 active members supplying 24-hour ambulance service. The Mannsville Manor Rescue Squad observed their 30th anniversary in 1990. On January 4, 1991, the Rescue Squad became one of the first volunteer paramedic ambulance services in Jefferson County.

The Pierrepont Manor Complex was listed on the National Register of Historic Places in 1977.

== Geography ==
Mannsville is located near the southern border of Jefferson County at 43°42′41″N 76°3′51″W (43.711334, -76.064104), in the southeastern part of the town of Ellisburg. According to the United States Census Bureau, the village has a total area of 0.93 square miles (2.4 km^{2}), of which 0.89 square miles (2.3 km^{2}) are land and 0.04 square miles (0.1 km^{2}), or 3.50%, are water. Skinner Creek by the village attracted early settlers to use its water power.

Mannsville is at the intersection of U.S. Route 11 and County Road 90. Interstate 81 passes within one mile of the village to the west, with an interchange at CR 90. US-11 and I-81 lead north 21 miles (34 km) to Watertown, the county seat, and south 50 miles (80 km) to Syracuse.

== Demographics ==
Historical population
Census	Pop.	Note	%±
1880	473		—
1890	389		−17.8%
1900	352		−9.5%
1910	330		−6.2%
1920	265		−19.7%
1930	313		18.1%
1940	348		11.2%
1950	378		8.6%
1960	446		18.0%
1970	494		10.8%
1980	431		−12.8%
1990	444		3.0%
2000	400		−9.9%
2010	354		−11.5%
2020	297		−16.1%
U.S. Decennial Census

As of the census of 2000, there were 400 people, 143 households, and 106 families residing in the village. The population density was 434.6 inhabitants per square mile (167.8/km^{2}). There were 168 housing units at an average density of 182.5 per square mile (70.5/km^{2}). The racial makeup of the village was 99.25% White, 0.25% Native American, 0.25% Asian, and 0.25% from two or more races. Hispanic or Latino of any race were 0.50% of the population.

There were 143 households, out of which 42.7% had children under the age of 18 living with them, 54.5% were married couples living together, 15.4% had a female householder with no husband present, and 25.2% were non-families. 18.2% of all households were made up of individuals, and 9.1% had someone living alone who was 65 years of age or older. The average household size was 2.71 and the average family size was 3.07.

In the village, the population was spread out, with 28.8% under the age of 18, 7.3% from 18 to 24, 30.8% from 25 to 44, 18.0% from 45 to 64, and 15.3% who were 65 years of age or older. The median age was 36 years. For every 100 females, there were 89.6 males. For every 100 females age 18 and over, there were 85.1 males.

The median income for a household in the village was $47,574, and the median income for a family was $48,182. Males had a median income of $29,545 versus $20,625 for females. The per capita income for the village was $16,768. About 13.6% of families and 15.7% of the population were below the poverty line, including 24.0% of those under age 18 and 4.5% of those age 65 or over.

== Education ==
The school district is the South Jefferson Central School District.
