= Southwick Beach State Park =

State park in Jefferson County, New York

Coordinates: 43°46′08″N 76°12′14″W

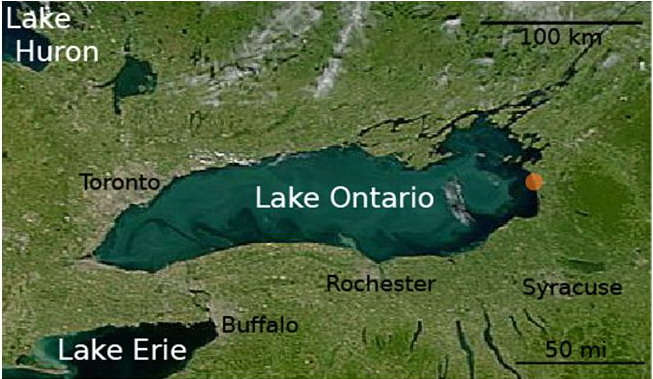
The orange dot indicates the location of Southwick Beach State Park on this satellite image of Lake Ontario.

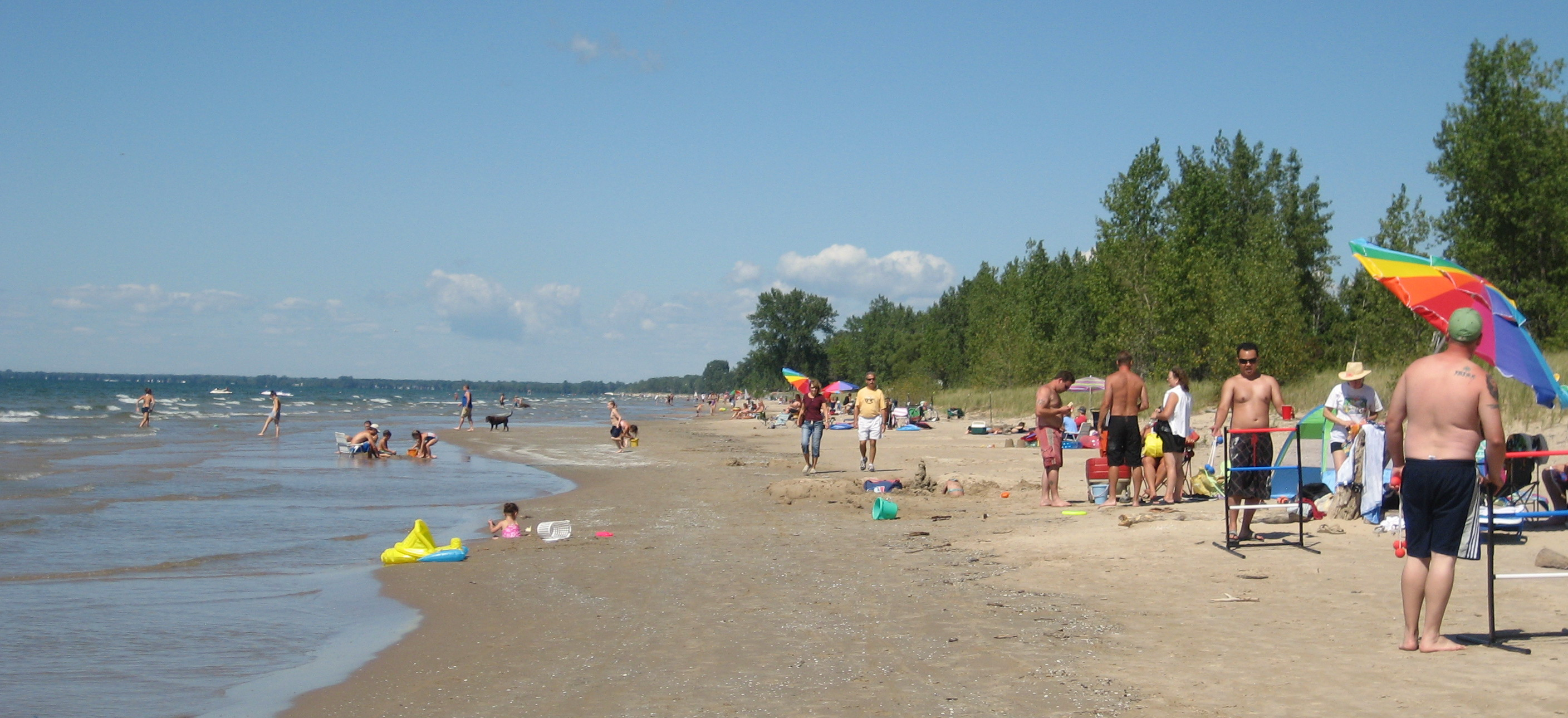
Sandy beach and bathers at Southwick Beach State Park in August.

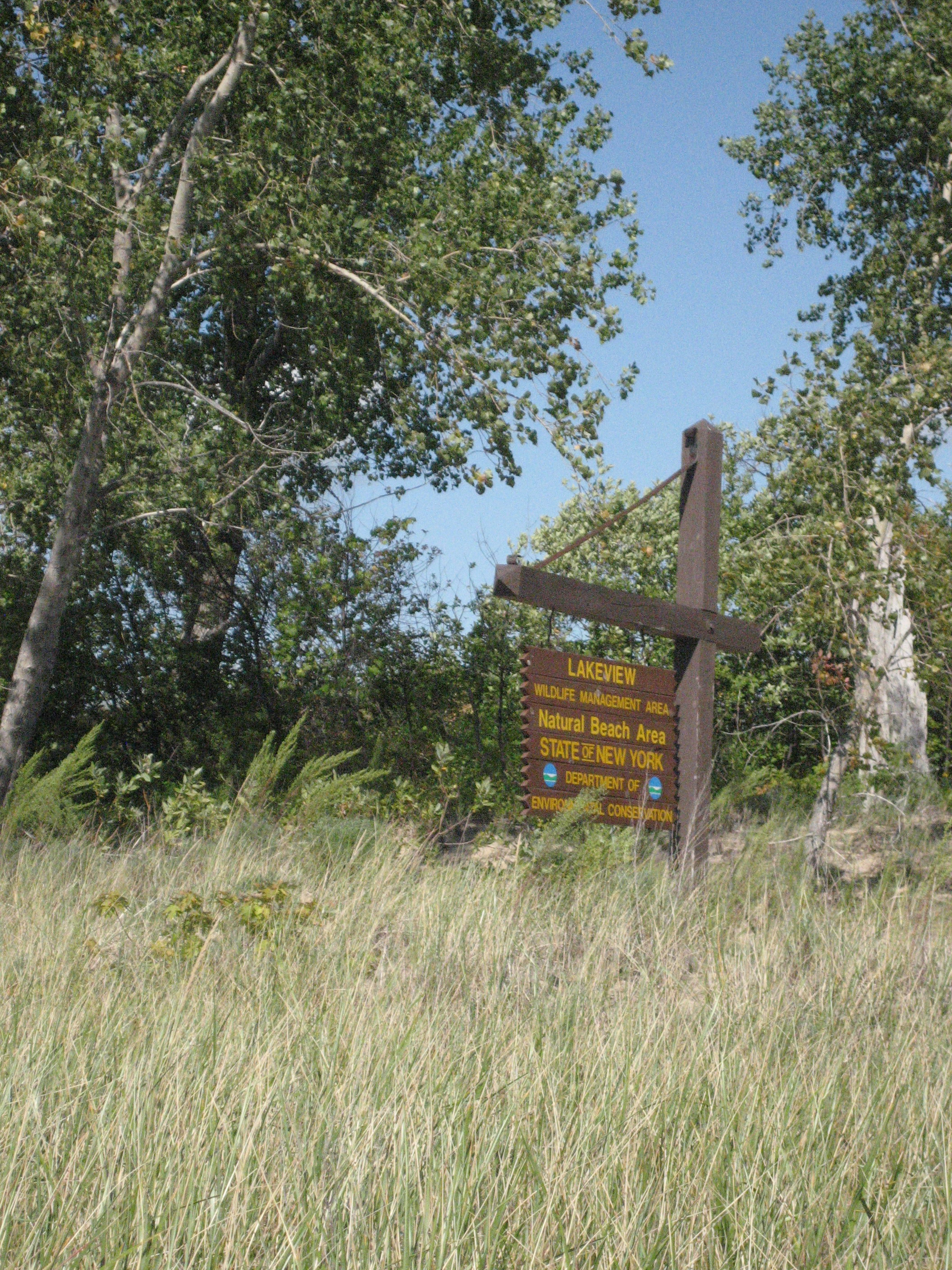
Boundary sign for Lakeview Wildlife Management Area in August. The sign is on top of a sandy foredune that is immediately adjacent to the Lake Ontario shoreline. The beachgrass in the foreground is essential to stabilizing the sand in the dune. The trees near the sign are eastern cottonwood trees, which are the only dune-forming trees in the region. To the left of the sign are several tall wormwood plants.

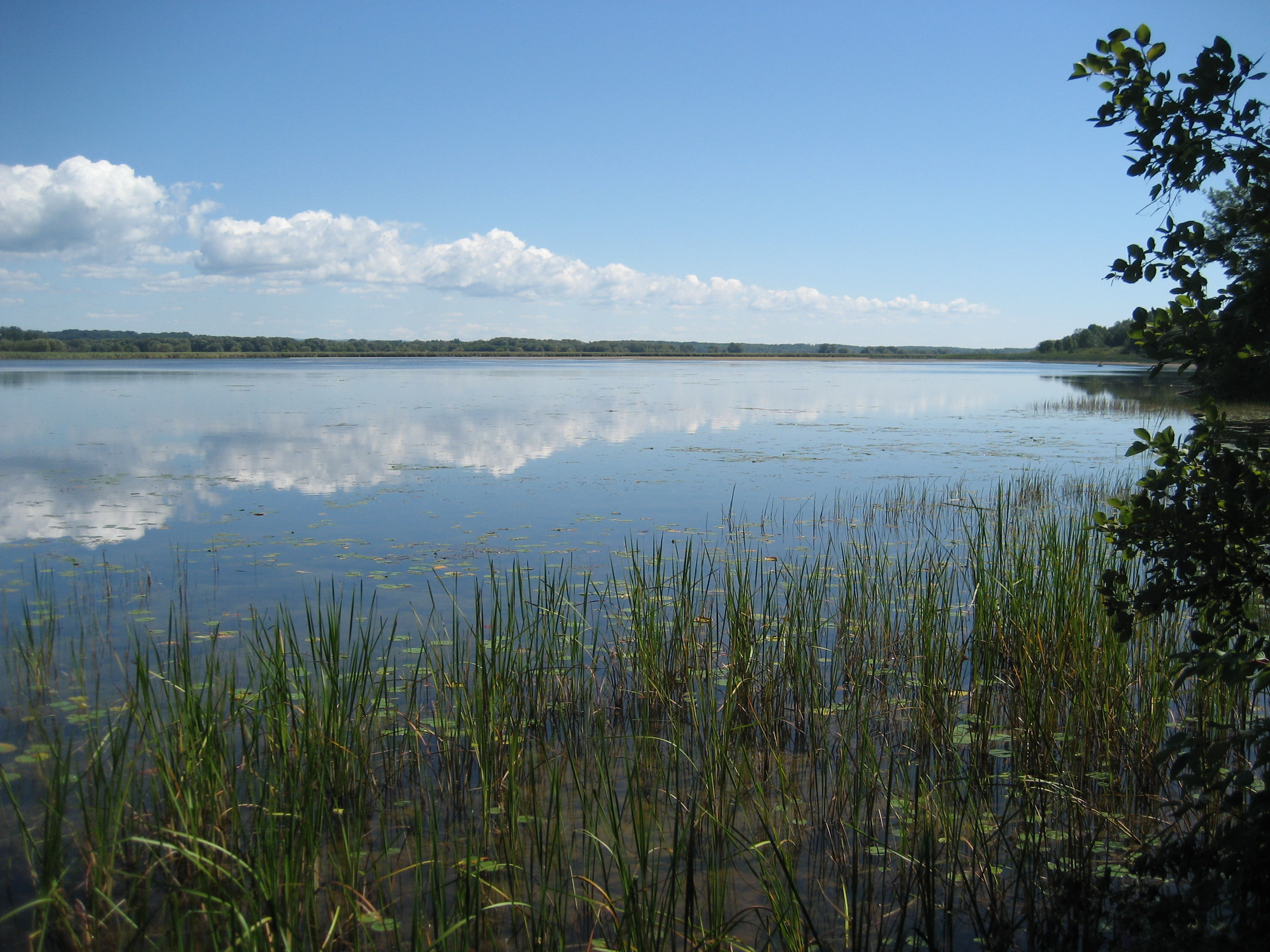
Lakeview Pond is separated from Lake Ontario by a long, narrow system of sand dunes that is 200 feet (61 m) wide and more than 2 miles (3.2 km) long. The aquatic plants in the foreground are mostly narrowleaf cattail. The Pond lies within the Lakeview Wildlife Management Area; this viewpoint is at the end of the second, wooden dune walkover reached by walking south along the beach from the park.

Southwick Beach State Park is a New York State park that lies along an unusual stretch of sandy beach on the eastern shore of Lake Ontario. The park is 464 acres (188 ha) in size with a 3,500 foot (1,100 m) length of beach, and is visited annually by about 100,000 people. Immediately to the south is the Lakeview Wildlife Management Area (3,461 acres (1,401 ha)), which extends the publicly accessible beach by several miles. They are in the Town of Ellisburg in Jefferson County, New York south of the lakeside community of Jefferson Park.

The park offers an extensive campground with tent and trailer sites, picnic facilities, playing fields and a playground. In summer, the swimming area has lifeguards and the park store is open. In winter, snowmobiles are permitted in the park. The park has an accessible nature trail. There are hiking trails from the park that extend into the Lakeview Wildlife Management Area. Lakeview itself has several access points for launching boats, as well as a second nature trail along South Sandy Creek. The hiking trails and boat routes are described at several websites, and in guidebooks by William P. Ehling and by Susan Peterson Gateley.

The park and wildlife management area lie within a rare, freshwater coastal barrier environment that consists of beaches, sand dunes, embayments and marshes. The wildlife management area is also the Lakeview Marsh and Barrier Beach National Natural Landmark, which was cited in 1973 as "One of the best and most extensive marshlands that lie in protected bays and behind barrier beaches along eastern Lake Ontario." Southwick Beach State Park and Lakeview Wildlife Management Area are included within the New York State Natural Heritage Area entitled "Eastern Lake Ontario Barrier Beach and Wetland Complex"; Lakeview is incorporated in the Eastern Lake Ontario Marshes Bird Conservation Area.

== Beachgrass and the dunes ==
The dunes immediately adjacent to the beach support a plant community dominated by beachgrass. The beachgrass grows runners under the surface of the sand that interlock into a ropelike network, and actually builds the dune by trapping sand. Some tall wormwood plants grow amidst the beachgrass, as do cottonwood trees and sand dune willows. Cottonwood is the only dune-forming tree in the area. Sand dune willows are fairly rare in New York State, but are a common woody plant in these dunes. This "beachgrass plant community" stabilizes the dunes against erosion by wind and storm, and enables the growth of a more complex, "poison ivy-dune grape-cottonwood plant community" deeper in the dunes.

Beachgrass growth is disrupted by human and animal traffic. In heavily used regions of the eastern Lake Ontario dunes, foot traffic has eliminated this plant community entirely. Without the beachgrass, the sand dunes are blown away by wind. Starting in the early 1990s, there has been extensive restoration of the beachgrass along eastern Lake Ontario. Wooden "walkovers" have been constructed to manage traffic across the dunes between the beach and interior trails and waterways. The restoration has been accompanied by education and outreach programs intended to reduce traffic across the dunes. The improvement in beachgrass growth has been documented by a "photomonitoring project" from 1995-2005.

Until the 20th Century, the beachgrass in this region would have been the type now known as "Champlain beachgrass", which is found only along eastern Lake Ontario and along Lake Champlain. It is very similar to the common American beachgrass native to the Atlantic coasts of North America, but blooms in July instead of September. "Cape variety" American beachgrass was introduced into the area, and is now mixed with Champlain.

== Boogie, baseball, and beaches: the Southwick history ==
Southwick Beach State Park was named after the Southwick family, who owned the property for nearly a century (1870 to 1960); the park is referred to as "Southwick's Beach State Park" on some maps. Starting in the 1920s, several promoters built entertainment facilities on the property. The most notable was Albert Ellis, who leased the beach from the Southwick family for about 15 years, and developed it as the "Coney Island" of Northern New York. In time, the beach boasted a roller coaster, bathhouses, a dance pavilion, merry go-round, and midway. Ellis also organized the Jefferson County Amateur Baseball League. A baseball diamond was built at Southwick Beach, and for several years there was a Southwick Beach team. These businesses failed during the Great Depression (1929–1941).

By the 1950s, the value of the eastern Lake Ontario shoreline for recreation and conservation was becoming clear, although little of this land was publicly owned. In 1960, the Leesi Management Corporation of Syracuse purchased the beach property from the Southwick family and operated the beach as a recreational facility for five years. The New York State Office of Parks, Recreation and Historic Preservation purchased the property in 1965 for $150,000; Southwick Beach State Park opened in May, 1966.

== Lagoons and sand: geology of eastern Lake Ontario ==
The sandy beaches at the Park are part of a 17-mile (27 km) length of sandy shore between Sandy Pond to the south and Black Pond to the north. Another comparable stretch of sandy beach on Lake Ontario is at Sandbanks Provincial Park in Prince Edward County, Ontario, Canada, which is along the northeastern shore of the lake. These are the main areas with sandy beaches on Lake Ontario.

Bradford B. van Diver has described the eastern Lake Ontario dunes as "similar in many details to the south shore of Long Island, with drowned river mouths forming lagoons behind a smooth curving line of barrier bars." The lagoons to which van Diver refers are the notable ponds of this region, including (from north to south) Black, Lakeview, North Sandy, and South Sandy. Both the rivers themselves, and their mouths, are no longer evident. Shortly after the cessation of the last ice age about 10,000 years ago, the water level of Lake Ontario was much lower than it is today; one needs to envision large rivers flowing into a lake some tens of meters lower than today's level. The river mouths were then "drowned" by the rise of the water level of Lake Ontario above this low point. Similarly, sand itself is no longer being formed in abundance; the sand present on today's beaches was probably formed long ago, and transported down from higher elevations during the post-glacial period of low water levels in the lake.
