= List of lighthouses in New York =

This is a list of all lighthouses in the U.S. state of New York as identified by the United States Coast Guard.

"Historic Light Station Information and Photography: New York". United States Coast Guard Historian's Office. Archived from the original on May 1, 2017.

Name	Image	Location	Coordinates	Year first lit	Automated	Year deactivated	Current Lens	Focal Height
Ambrose Light		Lower New York Bay	40°27′00″N 73°48′00″W	1967 (First); 1999 (Last)	1988	1999 (First); 2008 (Last)	None	76 ft (23 m)
Barber's Point Light		Westport (Lake Champlain)	44.1543°N 73.4045°W	1873	Never	1935 (Now a private house)	None	36 ft (11 m)
Barcelona Light		Westfield	42°20′27″N 79°35′42″W	1829	Never	1859	None	40 ft (12 m)
Blackwell Island Light		New York City (Roosevelt Island)	40°46′22″N 73°56′24.6″W	1872	Never	1940	None	50 ft (15 m)
Bluff Point Light		Valcour Island (Lake Champlain)	44°37′22″N 73°25′52″W	1874	1930	Active (Inactive: 1930–2004)	300mm	95 ft (29 m)
Braddock Point Light		Braddock Bay	43°20′28″N 77°45′45″W	1896	Never	1954 (Now a private house)	None	55 ft (17 m)
Buffalo Main Light		Buffalo (Buffalo River)	42°52′49″N 78°53′45″W	1833	Never	1914	None	60 ft (18 m)
Buffalo Harbor North Entrance Light		Buffalo	Unknown	1903	1935	1980	None	Unknown
Buffalo Harbor South Entrance Light		Buffalo	42°50′0″N 78°52′3″W	1903	1935	Active	Unknown	Unknown
Buffalo North breakwater East end Light		Buffalo	N/A	1903	1960	1985	None	29 ft (8.8 m)
Buffalo North Breakwater South End Light		Buffalo	42°52′49″N 78°53′45″W	1903	1960	1985	None	Unknown
Cape Vincent Breakwater Lighthouse		Cape Vincent	44°7′10″N 76°19′56″W	1904	Never	1951	None	25 ft (7.6 m)
Cedar Island Light		East Hampton (Cedar Point County Park)	41°2′26.9″N 72°15′39.5″W	1839 (Former); 1868 (Current)	Never	1934	None	57 ft (17 m)
Charlotte–Genesee Lighthouse		Rochester	43°15′10″N 77°36′40″W	1822	Never	1881 (Now a museum)	None	Unknown
Cold Spring Harbor Light		Cold Spring Harbor	40°54′26.0″N 73°30′35.5″W (Preserved light); 40°54′51.0″N 73°29′35.2″W (Current structure)	1890 (Former); 1965 (Current)	1965 (Current)	Active (Replacement)	Unknown	Unknown
Coney Island Light		New York City (Brooklyn)	40°34′36″N 74°00′42″W	1890 (Former); 1920 (Current)	1989	Active	Unknown	75 ft (23 m)
Coxsackie Light		Coxsackie, New York (Hudson River)	42°22′47″N 73°47′41″W	1830 (Former); 1868 (Current)	Never	1940	None	Unknown
Crossover Island Light		Saint Lawrence River (Border light)	44°29′49″N 75°46′42″W	1848 (Former); 1882 (Current)	Never	1941	None	Unknown
Crown Point Light		Crown Point (Lake Champlain)	44.0299°N 73.4216°W	1858	Never	1926	None	Unknown
Cumberland Head Light		Cumberland Head (Lake Champlain)	44°41′29″N 73°23′7″W	1838 (Former); 1868 (Current)	2003 (Relit)	Active (Inactive: 1934–2003)	Unknown	Unknown
Dunkirk Light		Dunkirk	42°29′38″N 79°21′14″W	1826 (Former); 1875 (Current)	1960	Active	Third-order Fresnel	61 ft (19 m)
East Charity Shoal Light		Lake Ontario (Border light)	44°2′12″N 76°28′54″W	1877 (Moved to NY in 1935)	1935	Active (Also a private house)	Unknown	52 ft (16 m)
Eatons Neck Light		Eatons Neck	40°57′14.5″N 73°23′42.5″W	1799	1969	Active	Third-order Fresnel	126 ft (38 m)
Elm Tree Beacon Light		New York City (Staten Island)	40°33′50″N 74°5′43″W	1856 (Former); 1939 (Current)	1939	1964	None	62 ft (19 m) (Original)
Esopus Meadows Light		Esopus (Hudson River)	41°52′6.2″N 73°56′29.8″W	1839 (Former); 1872 (Current)	1965	Active (Inactive: 1965–2003)	Unknown	52 ft (16 m)
Execution Rocks Light		Long Island Sound	40°52′41.3″N 73°44′16.3″W	1850	1979	Active	APRB-251	62 ft (19 m)
Fire Island Light		Fire Island (Long Island)	40°37′56.8″N 73°13′6.9″W	1826 (Former); 1858 (Current)	1938	Active (Inactive: 1974–1986)	DCB-224	168 ft (51 m)
Fort Niagara Light		Porter (Fort Niagara State Park)	43°15′42″N 79°3′48″W	1782 (Former); 1872 (Current)	Never	1993	None	91 ft (28 m)
Fort Tompkins Light		New York City (Staten Island)	40.6057°N 74.0539°W	1828 (The last L.H. was built in 1873)	Never	1903 (Demolished)	None	Unknown
Fort Wadsworth Light		New York City (Staten Island)	40°36′21″N 74°3′14″W	1903	2005 (Relit)	Active (Inactive: 1965–2005)	Unknown	75 ft (23 m)
Frenchman Island Light		Oneida Lake	43°13′06″N 76°02′59″W	1918	1949	Active	Unknown	Unknown
Galloo Island Light		Hounsfield (Galloo Island)	43°53′18″N 76°26′42″W	1820 (Former); 1867 (Current)	1963	Active	190mm	58 ft (18 m)
Horse Island Light		Hounsfield (Sackets Harbor)	43°56′35″N 76°8′40″W	1831 (Former); 1870 (Current)	1925	1957 (Now a private house)	None	Unknown
Horton Point Light		Southold	41°5′6.51″N 72°26′44.77″W	1857	1933 (Inactive: 1933–1990)	Active	VRB-25	103 ft (31 m)
Hudson–Athens Lighthouse		Hudson River	42°15′7″N 73°48′31″W	1874	1949	Active	300mm	46 ft (14 m)
Huntington Harbor Light		Huntington	40°54′38.6″N 73°25′52.7″W	1857 (Former); 1912 (Current)	1949	Active	300mm	41 ft (12 m)
Latimer Reef Light		Southold (Fishers Island)	41°18′16.227″N 72°55′59.937″W	1884	1954	Active	300mm	55 ft (17 m)
Little Gull Island Light		Long Island Sound (Little Gull Island)	41°12′23″N 72°06′25″W	1806 (Former); 1869 (Current)	1978	Active	Unknown	91 ft (28 m)
Little Red Lighthouse; Jeffrey's Hook Light		New York City (Manhattan)	40°51′1″N 73°56′49″W	1889 (Former); 1921 (Current)	2002 (Relit)	Active (Inactive: 1947–2002)	300mm	Unknown
Montauk Point Light		Montauk	41°04′16″N 71°51′26″W	1797	1987	Active	VRB-25	168 ft (51 m)
New Dorp Light		New York City (Staten Island)	40°34′51″N 74°7′12″W	1856	Never	1964 (Now a private house)	None	190 ft (58 m)
North Brother Island Light		New York City; The Bronx	40°47′57.3″N 73°53′58.5″W	1869	Never	1953 (Now Ruins)	None	50 ft (15 m)
North Dumpling Light		Long Island Sound (Near Fishers Island)	41°17′17″N 72°1′10″W	1849	1959	Active	300mm	60 ft (18 m)
Oak Orchard Light		Oak Orchard Creek	43°22′16″N 78°11′35″W	1871	Never	1914 (Destroyed in 1916)	None	Unknown
Ogdensburg Harbor Light		Ogdensburg	44°41′52″N 75°30′12″W	1834 (Former); 1900 (Current)	1941	Active (Inactive: 1961–2011)	Unknown	Unknown
Olcott Light		Olcott	43°20′20″N 78°42′54″W	1873	Never	1930 (Demolished in 1963, now active as a rebuilt replica)	Unknown	Unknown
Old Field Point Light		Old Field	40°57′45″N 73°07′49″W.	1823 (Former); 1869 (Current)	1991 (Relit)	Active (Inactive: 1933–1991)	Unknown	74 ft (23 m)
Old Orchard Shoal Light		Lower New York Bay	40°30′44.272″N 74°5′55.369″W	1893	1955	2012 (Destroyed by Sandy)	None	51 ft (16 m)
Orient Long Beach Bar Light		Orient	41°6′32″N 72°18′23″W	1871	Never	1945 (Destroyed in 1963, now active as a rebuilt replica)	Unknown	58 ft (18 m)
Orient Point Light		Orient	41°9′48.393″N 72°13′25.014″W	1899	1958	Active	Optic	64 ft (20 m)
Oswego Harbor West Pierhead Light		Oswego	43.47332°N 76.51682°W	1934 (Current)	1968	Active	Optic	57 ft (17 m)
Plum Island Light		Southold (Plum Island)	41°10′25.20″N 72°12′41.47″W	1827 (Former); 1870 (Current)	1978	Active (metal tower)	Unknown	50 ft (15 m)
Point Aux Roches Light		Champlain (Lake Champlain)	44°47′58″N 73°21′38″W	1859	1933	1989	None	59 ft (18 m)
Prince's Bay Light		New York City (Staten Island)	40°30′27.7″N 74°12′48.3″W	1828 (Former); 1864 (Current)	2006 (Relit)	Active (Inactive: 1922–2006)	VRB-25	Unknown
Race Rock Light		Long Island Sound (Near Fishers Island)	41°14′36.6″N 72°2′49.2″W	1879	1978	Active	Unknown	67 ft (20 m)
Rock Island Light		Saint Lawrence River	44°16′50″N 76°1′1″W	1848 (Former); 1882 (Current)	Never	1956	None	50 ft (15 m)
Rondout Light		Kingston	41°55′15″N 73°57′45″W	1838 (Former); 1915 (Current)	1954	Active	250mm	54 ft (16 m)
Sands Point Light		North Hempstead	40°51′57.2″N 73°43′46.2″W	1809	Never	1922	None	65 ft (20 m)
Saugerties Light		Saugerties	42°4′19.53″N 73°55′46.72″W	1835 (Former); 1867 (Current)	1954	Active (Inactive: 1954–1990)	Unknown	42 ft (13 m)
Selkirk Light		Pulaski	43°34′24″N 76°12′06″W	1838	1989 (Relit)	Active (Inactive: 1859–1989)	190mm	50 ft (15 m)
Shinnecock Light		Southampton (Shinnecock Bay)	40°51′2″N 72°30′15″W	1858	Never	1931 (Demolished in 1948)	None	168 ft (51 m)
Sodus Outer Light		Sodus	43°16′38.3″N 76°58′26.4″W	1858 (Former); 1938 (Current)	1980	Active	Unknown	51 ft (16 m)
Sodus Point Light		Sodus (Sodus Point)	43°16′25.7″N 76°59′10.2″W	1825 (Former); 1871 (Current)	Never	1901	None	70 ft (21 m)
South Buffalo North Side Light		Dunkirk	42°50′7″N 78°52′3″W	1903	1960	1985	None	Unknown
Staten Island Light		New York City (Staten Island)	40°34′33.8″N 74°08′28.5″W	1912	1921	Active	Unknown	231 ft (70 m)
Statue of Liberty		New York City (Liberty Island)	40°41′21″N 74°2′40″W	1886	—	1902 (As a lighthouse)	—	305 ft (93 m)
Stepping Stones Light		Long Island Sound	40°49′27.6″N 73°46′29.1″W	1877	1964	Active	300mm	46 ft (14 m)
Stony Point (Henderson) Light		Henderson	43°50′22″N 76°17′54″W	1839 (Former); 1869 (Current)	1947	1959	None	58 ft (18 m)
Stony Point Light		Stony Point	41°14′29″N 73°58′20″W	1826	1995 (Relit)	Active (Inactive: 1925–1995)	Fourth-order Fresnel	58 ft (18 m)
Stuyvesant Light		Stuyvesant	42°24′42″N 73°46′42″W	1829 (Former); 1868 (Current)	Never	1933	None	42 ft (13 m)
Sunken Rock Light		Saint Lawrence River (Bush Island)	44°20′44″N 75°54′55″W	1847 (Former); 1882 (Current)	1958	Active	Unknown	Unknown
Tarrytown Light		Sleepy Hollow	41°5′2.6″N 73°52′27.3″W	1883	Never	1961	Fourth-order Fresnel (Replica)	56 ft (17 m)
Thirty Mile Point Light		Somerset	43°22′30″N 78°29′11″W	1876	1958	Active	300mm	71 ft (22 m)
Throgs Neck Light		New York City; The Bronx	40°48′16″N 73°47′26″W	1826 (The last L.H. was built in 1906)	Never	1934	None	Unknown
Tibbetts Point Light		Cape Vincent	44°6′00″N 76°22′12″W	1827 (Former); 1854 (Current)	1970	Active	Fourth-order Fresnel	69 ft (21 m)
West Point Light		West Point	41°23′45″N 73°57′3″W	1853	Never	1946	None	40 ft (12 m)
West Bank Light		Lower New York Bay	40°32′16.8″N 74°02′34.1″W	1901	1980	Active	300mm	69 ft (21 m)
Whitestone Point Light		New York City; Queens	40°48′06″N 73°49′10″W	1889	Unknown	Active	Unknown	56 ft (17 m)
