= List of shipwrecks in August 1889 =

The list of shipwrecks in August 1889 includes ships sunk, foundered, grounded, or otherwise lost during August 1889.

== 1 August ==
List of shipwrecks: 1 August 1889
Ship	State	Description
City of Agra	United Kingdom	The steamship ran aground at the mouth of the River Thames.
Vinnie M. Getchell	United States	The schooner was run down and sunk. Her crew were rescued.

== 2 August ==
List of shipwrecks: 2 August 1889
Ship	State	Description
HMS Garnet	Royal Navy	The Emerald-class corvette collided with Bianca (Flag unknown) at Rangoon, Burma and was damaged.

== 4 August ==
List of shipwrecks: 4 August 1889
Ship	State	Description
Bloomer	United States	The schooner capsized in a squall 55 miles (89 km) east southeast of Pensacola, Florida.
Lillydale	United Kingdom	The brigantine sprang a leak and was beached at Rosslare Harbour, County Wexford. She was on a voyage from Newport, Monmouthshire to Cork. She was later refloated and taken in to Rosslare Harbour.

== 7 August ==
List of shipwrecks: 7 August 1889
Ship	State	Description
Thomas Oliver	United Kingdom	The ship was abandoned off "Gorodetsk", between "Sweet Nore" and "Orloff"", Russia.
Rachel Loluiga	United Kingdom	The lighter sprang a leak off Berwick upon Tweed, Northumberland. She was on a voyage from Middlesbrough, Yorkshire to Leith, Lothian. She consequently foundered off Burnmouth, Berwickshire. Her crew were rescued by the tug Flying Scotsman (United Kingdom).

== 8 August ==
List of shipwrecks: 8 August 1889
Ship	State	Description
Cincora	United Kingdom	The steamship was driven ashore at Scutari, Ottoman Empire. She was on a voyage from Antwerp, Belgium to Constantinople, Ottoman Empire. She was refloated.
Monark	United Kingdom	The ship departed from Pensacola, Florida, United States for the River Tyne. No further trace, reported overdue.
Unnamed	Cape Colony	The whaleboat capsized off the mouth of the Coega River with the loss of all five people on board.

== 9 August ==
List of shipwrecks: 9 August 1889
Ship	State	Description
Wildwood	United States	While departing Nushagak on Bristol Bay in the District of Alaska carrying the summer's catch from the cannery at Nushagak, the barque was wrecked in the Nushagak River 2 nautical miles (3.7 km; 2.3 mi) south of Harkanock. Her 21 crew survived.

== 11 August ==
List of shipwrecks: 11 August 1889
Ship	State	Description
Emelia	Italy	The barque foundered in the Atlantic Ocean. Her crew were rescued. She was on a voyage from Milazzo to Buenos Aires, Argentina.

== 12 August ==
List of shipwrecks: 12 August 1889
Ship	State	Description
Bellaporte	United Kingdom	The barque was driven ashore and sank at Iquique, Chile with the loss of five of her twenty crew. Survivors were rescued by the full-rigged ship East Lothian (United Kingdom). Bellaporte was on a voyage from Iquique to Rotterdam, South Holland, Netherlands.
Sunbeam, and an unnamed vessel	United Kingdom	The tug Sunbeam and a barge were run into by the steamship Halcyon (United Kingdom) and sank in the River Thames at Rotherhithe, London. Their crews were rescued.

== 13 August ==
List of shipwrecks: 13 August 1889
Ship	State	Description
Cleveland	United Kingdom	The steamship sank off Gandia, Spain. She was refloated in mid-September.
Lady Sondes	United Kingdom	The ship departed from Charlestown, Cornwall for Brussels, Flemish Brabant, Belgium. No further, reported missing.

== 14 August ==
List of shipwrecks: 14 August 1889
Ship	State	Description
Unnamed	Flag unknown	The ketch foundered in the English Channel off Portland, Dorset, United Kingdom.

== 16 August ==
List of shipwrecks: 16 August 1889
Ship	State	Description
Principia	United Kingdom	The steamship was driven ashore in the River Thames at Coal House Point, Essex. She was on a voyage from Odesa, Russia to London. She was refloated the next day with the assistance of four tugs.
Unnamed	Flag unknown	The steamship ran aground in the Small Bitter Lake. She was refloated the next day and resumed her voyage.

== 17 August ==
List of shipwrecks: 17 August 1889
Ship	State	Description
A.E. Vickery	United States	The schooner sank after striking a shoal while entering the American Narrows in the St. Lawrence River near Alexandria Bay, New York.
Merquedes	France	The steamship sank off Ar Men, Finistère.
St. Andrews Bay	United Kingdom	The steamship was damaged by an onboard explosion at South Shields, County Durham.

== 19 August ==
List of shipwrecks: 19 August 1889
Ship	State	Description
Hindoo	United Kingdom	The steamship caught fire at Boston, Massachusetts, United States. She was on a voyage from Hull, Yorkshire to Boston.

== 20 August ==
List of shipwrecks: 20 August 1889
Ship	State	Description
Kate	United Kingdom	The yacht capsized at Voryd, Denbighshire with the loss of all three people on board. She was on a voyage from Birkenhead, Cheshire to Beaumaris, Anglesey.
Sturgeon	United Kingdom	The ship was abandoned in the Irish Sea. Her six crew were rescued by the steamship Bickerstaffe (United Kingdom). Sturgeon was on a voyage from Preston, Lancashire to Peel, Isle of Man.
Torpedo boat No. 10	Royal Danish Navy	The torpedo boat capsized in the Øresund and subsequently sank whilst under tow for Copenhagen. She was salvaged, repaired and returned to service.
Windhover	United Kingdom	The barque was lost off Bramble Cay, Queensland. All 22 people on board took to the boats. They landed on Thursday Island a week later. She was on a voyage from Newcastle, New South Wales to Batavia, Netherlands East Indies.

== 21 August ==
List of shipwrecks: 21 August 1889
Ship	State	Description
Gardar	Norway	The steamship caught fire off Southend, Essex, United Kingdom. She was on a voyage from Stavanger to London. The fire was extinguished with assistance from the tugs Bulldog and Vauxhall (both United Kingdom) and she was towed in to Gravesend, Kent by Vauxhall.
Georgina	United Kingdom	The barque ran aground on the English Bank, in the River Plate and was wrecked with the loss of a crew member. Survivors were rescued by the tugs Emperor and Plata (both Brazil). Georgina was on a voyage from Newport, Monmouthshire to Rosario, Argentina.
Marlborough	United Kingdom	The steamship ran aground on the Mocha Shoal, in the Red Sea. She was on a voyage from Manila, Spanish East Indies to New York, United States. She was refloated five days later and put in to Jeddah, Hejaz Vilayet.

== 22 August ==
List of shipwrecks: 22 August 1889
Ship	State	Description
Forest Fairy	United States	The schooner departed from Boston, Massachusetts for Faial Island, Azores. No further trace, feared lost with all 37 people on board.

== 23 August ==
List of shipwrecks: 23 August 1889
Ship	State	Description
Ayrshire	United Kingdom	The steamship collided with another vessel in the Mediterranean Sea and was damaged. She was on a voyage from Taganrog, Russia to Malta.

== 24 August ==
List of shipwrecks: 24 August 1889
Ship	State	Description
Muncaster	United Kingdom	The steamship ran aground at Gravelines, Nord, France. She was refloated the next day.
Otago	United Kingdom	The ship was lost on this date.

== 25 August ==
List of shipwrecks: 25 August 1889
Ship	State	Description
Lame Duck	United States	The steamship collided with Commonwealth (United States) and sank in the Ohio River opposite Cincinnati, Ohio with the loss of four lives.
Seaman's Glory	United Kingdom	The ship capsized off Deal, Kent with the loss of four of the six people on board.

== 26 August ==
List of shipwrecks: 26 August 1889
Ship	State	Description
Armenia	United States	The full-rigged ship was destroyed by fire at Port Costa, California.
Honauwar	United Kingdom	The full-rigged ship was damaged by fire at Port Costa.
Jason, and No. 6	United Kingdom	The dredger No. 6 was run into by the steamship Jason and sank in the Clyde at Dumbarton with the loss of six of the ten people on board. Survivors were rescued by Jason. Jason was on a voyage from Glasgow, Renfrewshire to Stettin, Germany. She put back to Glasgow for repairs.
Kenilworth	United Kingdom	The full-rigged ship was damaged by fire at Port Costa.
Langdale	United Kingdom	The full-rigged ship was damaged by fire at Port Costa.
Taymouth Castle	United Kingdom	The steamship caught fire in the Atlantic Ocean 150 nautical miles (280 km) off Lisbon, Portugal. She was on a voyage from London to Cape Town, Cape Colony. The fire was extinguished and she completed her voyage.

== 27 August ==
List of shipwrecks: 27 August 1889
Ship	State	Description
Odessa	United Kingdom	The steamship collided with the steamship Homer (United Kingdom) and sank 30 nautical miles (56 km) south of Cape Espichel, Portugal with the loss of three of her fifteen crew. Survivors were rescued by Homer. Odessa was on a voyage from Hamburg, Germany to Brăila, Romania.

== 28 August ==
List of shipwrecks: 28 August 1889
Ship	State	Description
Ancon	United States	Wreck of Ancon, ca. 1895. The sidewheel paddle steamer, a cargo liner, was stranded on a rock projecting from a reef in Naha Bay (55°36′12″N 131°38′00″W) as she was departing the wharf at Loring, District of Alaska. Her back broke as the tide receded, and she became a total loss. All on board, 119 passengers and 72 crewmen, survived. They were rescued on 1 September by the steamship Elder (United States).

== 29 August ==
List of shipwrecks: 29 August 1889
Ship	State	Description
Arranmore	United Kingdom	The steamship sank at Liverpool, Lancashire.
Protector	United Kingdom	The tug was run into by the paddle tug Duncan (United Kingdom) and sank 2 cables (380m) off the Abertay Lightship ( Trinity House). Her crew were rescued by Duncan.

== 31 August ==
List of shipwrecks: 31 August 1889
Ship	State	Description
Diana	United Kingdom	The steamship was driven ashore in the Solent near Stone Point. Her passengers were taken off. Diana was on a voyage from Jersey, Channel Islands to Southampton, Hampshire. She was refloated the next day and taken in to Southampton.

== Unknown date ==
List of shipwrecks: Unknown date in August 1889
Ship	State	Description
Alice Bannister	United Kingdom	The ship ran aground on the Elbow Sand, off the coast of the Isle of Wight.
Alpha	Germany	The steamship was driven ashore. She was on a voyage from an English port to Lübeck. She was later refloated.
Arisaig	United Kingdom	The steamship ran aground at Honfleur, Manche, France. She was refloated.
Baines Hawkins	United Kingdom	The ship was driven ashore and damaged at Malmö, Sweden.
Baron Blantyre	United Kingdom	The ship ran aground and sank in the Strait of Bangka.
Belle of Benin	United Kingdom	The ship ran aground at Opobo, Niger Coast Protectorate. She was a total loss.
Bellisle	United Kingdom	The ship was wrecked.
Bempton	United Kingdom	The steamship was driven ashore at Guia, Portugal. She was on a voyage from Brăila, Romania to Antwerp, Belgium.
Ben Righ	United Kingdom	The schooner ran aground at Saltholmen, Denmark. She was on a voyage from Lybster, Caithness to Danzig, Germany. She was refloated with assistance.
Bittern	United Kingdom	The steamship was damaged by fire at Glasgow, Renfrewshire.
Blue Jacket	United Kingdom	The ship sank off New Quay, Cardiganshire. She was on a voyage from Towyn, Caernarfonshire to Portsmouth, Hampshire.
Bonny Kate	United Kingdom	The steamship ran aground at Falsterbo, Sweden. She was on a voyage from Piteå, Sweden to London. She was refloated with the assistance of a steamship and resumed her voyage.
Carl Johan, or Karl Johan	Sweden	The schooner was abandoned at sea. She was subsequently towed in to Copenhagen, Denmark by the steamship Romney (Denmark).
Catharina II	Russia	The steamship was driven ashore in the Dardanelles.
Centennial, and Kanahooka	United Kingdom	The steamships collided at Sydney, New South Wales. Centennial sank. She was on a voyage from Sydney to Wellington, New Zealand. Kanahooka was severely damaged. She was on a voyage from Wollongong to Sydney.
Chipchase, and Christine Sophie	United Kingdom; Norway	The steamship Chipchase and the barque Christine Sophie collided in the North Sea. Both vessels were damaged. Chipchase towed Christine Sophie in to Bridlington, Yorkshire.
Colombo	United Kingdom	The barque ran aground in the Brisbane River.
Dewdrop	United Kingdom	The steamship ran aground at "Malorm Kalix", Sweden. She was later refloated and taken in to "Karlsberg".
Eduard Virgino	Italy	The ship foundered in the Atlantic Ocean (32°13′N 39°22′W). Twelve people were rescued by the barque Giudotta D (Italy). Eduard Virgino was on a voyage from Kotonow, French Guinea to Lisbon, Portugal.
Empress of India	United Kingdom	The steamship was run into by the steamship Rheinfels (Germany) at Port Said, Egypt and was severely damaged.
Emtrucht	Germany	The barque sank in the North Sea, following a collision with the corvette HMS Active off the Yorkshire coast.
Francis and Jane	United Kingdom	The schooner was driven ashore at Southend, Essex.
Hanna	Norway	The barque ran aground at Saltholmen. She was later refloated with assistance.
Harold	United Kingdom	The steamship was driven ashore on Bon Portage Island, Nova Scotia, Canada. She was on a voyage from Boston, Massachusetts, United States to Cork.
Hawthorn	United Kingdom	The barque was wrecked on the coast of the Natal Colony.
Horsley	United Kingdom	The steamship ran aground at Trelleborg, Sweden. She was on a voyage from Blyth, Northumberland to Kronstadt, Russia. She was refloated with assistance and found to be leaky.
J. C. Williams	United States	The ship sprang a leak and sank off Barbados. Her crew were rescued.
Johannes	Germany	The steamship was driven ashore in the Nieuwe Diep. Some of her crew were rescued. She was on a voyage from Danzig to Dunkirk, Nord, France.
Joseph Wilde	United States	The schooner collided with the steamship Nessmore (United Kingdom) and sank at the mouth of the Chesapeake River. Her crew survived.
Kenilworth	Germany	The barque was wrecked in the Fly River. Five of her crew were reported missing. She was on a voyage from Newcastle upon Tyne, Northumberland to Surabaya, Netherlands East Indies.
Kuopio	Russia	The schooner capsized at Visby, Gotland, Sweden. Her crew were rescued.
Manche	France	The brig was driven ashore on Île Verte, Finistère.
Maria	Netherlands	The barque ran aground at Menado, Netherlands East Indies. She was refloated, but was subsequently destroyed by fire at sea. Her crew were rescued.
Marianne Bertha	Germany	The barque ran aground on the Lillegrund, in the Baltic Sea. She was on a voyage from the River Tyne to Memel. She was refloated and taken in to Copenhagen in a leaky condition.
Mathilde	Germany	The brig ran aground on the Middelgrund, in the Baltic Sea. she was on a voyage from Amsterdam, North Holland, Netherlands to Riga, Russia. She was refloated and resumed her voyage.
Montreal	United Kingdom	The steamship was driven ashore.
Mortlake	United Kingdom	The steamship ran aground at New York, United States. She was on a voyage from Tenerife, Canary Islands to New York. She was refloated and taken in to Newport News, Virginia, United States.
Nellie Pickup	United Kingdom	The schooner capsized in a squall at Cienfuegos, Captaincy General of Cuba.
Newcastle	Norway	The barque was driven ashore at Maldonado, Uruguay. Her crew were rescued.
Nouvelle Société	France	The ship ran aground and sank at Ryde, Isle of Wight, United Kingdom. She was later refloated.
Olaf Nicklesen	Norway	The ship ran aground in the Gironde. She was on a voyage from Sheet Harbour, Nova Scotia to Bordeaux, Gironde, France. She was refloated and taken in to Bordeaux in a leaky condition.
Omeagh	United Kingdom	The yacht ran aground on the Haisborough Sands, in the North Sea off the coast of Norfolk. She was refloated and taken in to Tilbury, Essex.
Ontario	United Kingdom	The steamship ran aground in the Saint Lawrence River at Pointe-aux-Trembles, Quebec, Canada. She was on a voyage from Montreal, Quebec to Avonmouth, Somerset. She was refloated and resumed her voyage.
Perpetua	United Kingdom	The barque was driven ashore at Glasson Dock, Lancashire. She was on a voyage from Glasson Dock to Buenos Aires, Argentina.
Persian	Germany	The schooner was driven ashore on Amrum, Germany.
Peter der Grosse	Russia	The steamship was driven ashore on Hiiumaa. She was on a voyage from Grangemouth, Stirlingshire, United Kingdom to Saint Petersburg. She was refloated and put in to Reval in a leaky condition.
Prince Lucien	Flag unknown	The ship was driven ashore in the Chandeleur Islands, Louisiana, United States.
Rose	Flag unknown	The ship was holed by her anchor at Chatham, New Brunswick, Canada and became severely leaky.
Rosedale	United Kingdom	The steamship was driven ashore at "Husvalla", Öland, Sweden.
Sarah A. Dudman	Russia	The barque was abandoned at sea. Her crew were rescued. She was on a voyage from Jamaica to Goole, Yorkshire, United Kingdom.
Scottish Fairy	United Kingdom	The barque was driven ashore in the Nieuw Diep. She was on a voyage from Pisagua, Chile to Hamburg.
Sierra Pedrosa	Flag unknown	The ship was driven ashore at Cape Town, Cape Colony. She was refloated and taken in to Cape Town.
Spes	Sweden	The schooner ran aground at "Sondre Rosse". She was on a voyage from Alloa, Clackmannanshire, United Kingdom to "Ahur".
St. Andrew's Bay	United Kingdom	The steamship was severely damaged by an onboard explosion at South Shields, County Durham.
Star of the East	United Kingdom	The smack was driven ashore at Spurn Point, Yorkshire. She subsequently became a wreck.
St. Lawrence	United States	The steamship was wrecked on "Hog Island", in the Saint Lawrence River.
Tagus	United Kingdom	The steamship ran aground off Scilla, Italy. She was refloated.
Torre del Oro	Spain	The steamship was severely damaged by fire at Seville.
Triumph	United Kingdom	The steamship collided with another vessel and sank at South Shields. She was later refloated and taken in to Wallsend, Northumberland for repairs.
Venus	Norway	The brig ran aground in the River Lee. She was on a voyage from Miramichi, New Brunswick, Canada to Ballinacurra, County Cork, United Kingdom.
Vesta	Sweden	The steamship ran aground at Gateshead, Northumberland.
Victoria	Spain	The barque was driven ashore on Grand Manan. Her crew were rescued. She was declared a total loss.
Vulcan	Germany	Wissmann Expedition: The steamship was wrecked at "Tangani", on the east coast of Africa. Her crew survived, but several of them were killed in attacks by the local inhabitants.
Welcome	United Kingdom	The Mersey Flat collided with another vessel and sank in the River Mersey off Egremont, Lancashire.
Zealous	United Kingdom	The steamship ran aground at Hartlepool, County Durham.
Zephyrus	United Kingdom	The ship was lost whilst on a voyage from Turku, Grand Duchy of Finland to Southampton, Hampshire.
