= Rock Island Light =

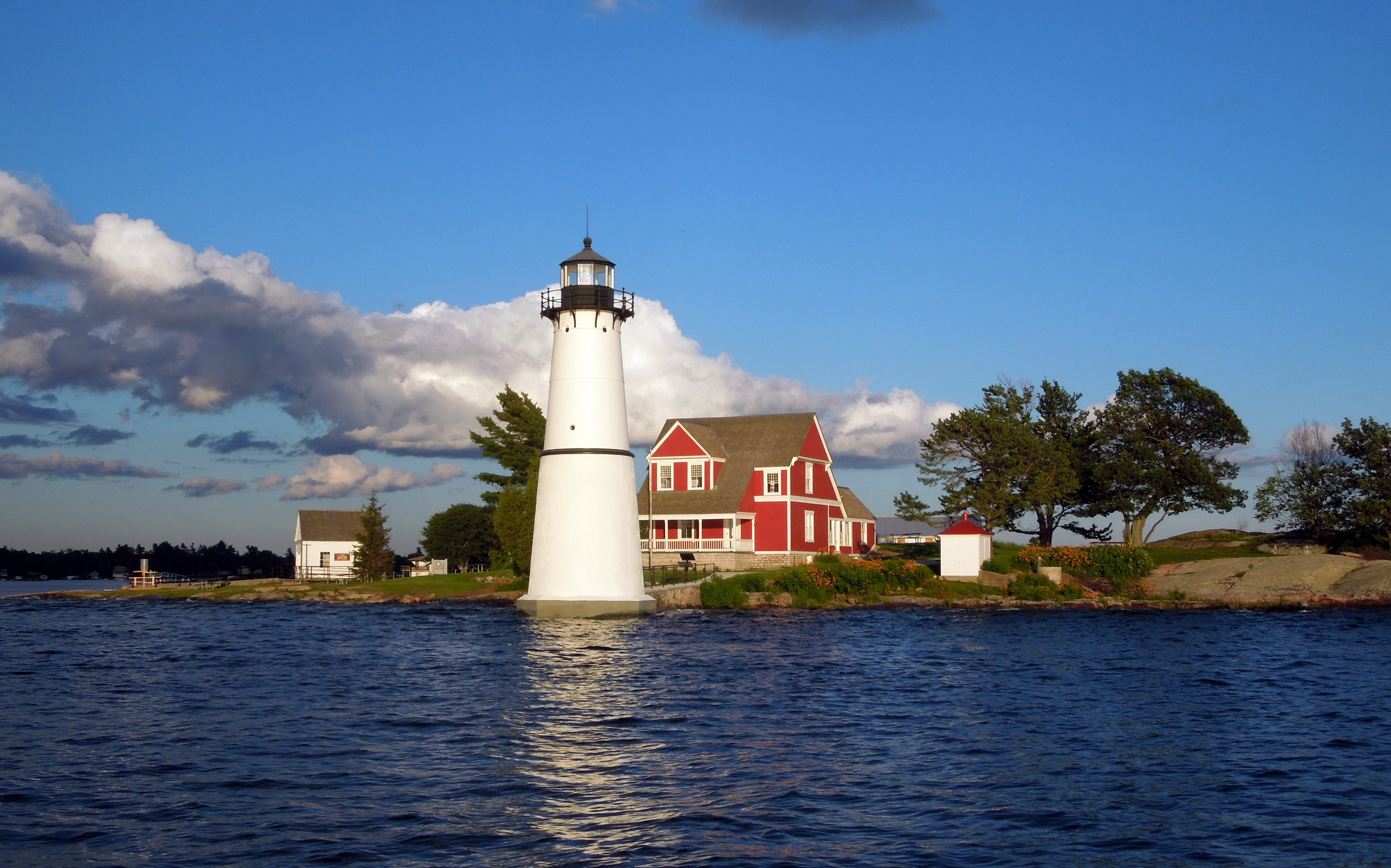
- Rock Island Light in 2015, after renovations
- Location: Rock Island; Saint Lawrence River; New York, USA
- Coordinates: 44°16′50″N 76°1′1″W

Tower
- Constructed: 1848
- Foundation: Concrete and limestone
- Construction: Cast iron
- Height: 30 feet (9.1 m)
- Shape: Conical
- Markings: White w/ black lantern
- Operator: New York State Office of Parks, Recreation and Historic Preservation
- Heritage: National Register of Historic Places listed place

Light
- First lit: 1882
- Deactivated: 1956
- Focal height: 50 feet (15 m)
- Lens: Sixth order Fresnel lens
- Characteristic: F W
- Rock Island Light Station
- U.S. National Register of Historic Places
- Architectural style: Lighthouse
- NRHP reference No.: 78001855
- Added to NRHP: November 14, 1978

Rock Island Light is a lighthouse on Rock Island in the Saint Lawrence River in Jefferson County, New York, United States. The island is owned by the New York State Office of Parks, Recreation and Historic Preservation and operated as Rock Island Lighthouse State Park.

The lighthouse was listed on the National Register of Historic Places in November 1978.

== History ==
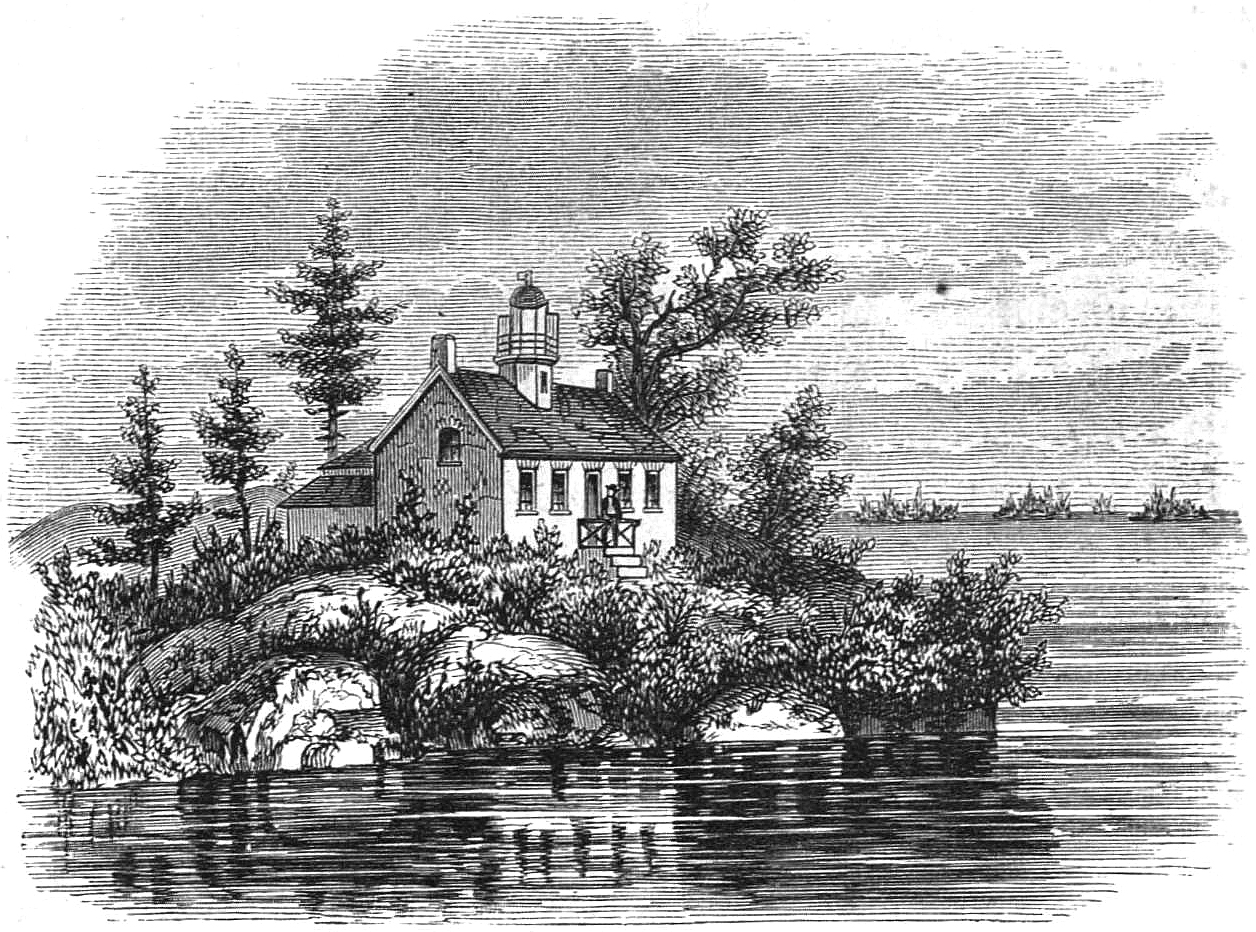
Sketch of the original Rock Island Lighthouse as it appeared in 1868.

Rock Island Light was first constructed in 1848 as one of three lights approved by the United States Congress for aiding navigation in the Thousand Islands region of the Saint Lawrence River. The other lights constructed at the same time were Crossover Island Light and Sunken Rock Light, both located east of Rock Island.

The original structure was a combination brick house and light, with the lantern centered on the house's pitched roof. This structure was replaced in 1882 with a separate iron tower that held the light aloft near the center of the island; the current two-story Victorian house was built in 1884.

Problems arose due to the new light being blocked by the two-story home and trees on the island; it was during this time that the A.E. Vickery sank near the island in 1889. The tower's platform was raised by five feet (1.5 m) in 1894 to help increase visibility, and finally the tower and light was moved to a brick base constructed off the north side of the island in 1903, where it remains today.

Additional structures remaining on the island include a smokehouse (built c. 1847), a carpenter's shop (1882), a generator house (1900), and a boathouse (1920).

Among the keepers hired to maintain the light was William Johnston, a man once known as "The Pirate of the Thousand Islands" for his actions as an American sympathizer during the Patriot War. In May 1838, Johnston and a small force overwhelmed the crew of the British mail steamer Sir Robert Peel; not having enough men to man the steamer, he set it on fire and ran it against a small island in the Saint Lawrence River, henceforth known as Peel Island. Johnston was declared an outlaw by the U.S. government, and was captured and tried several times before finally receiving a pardon. After being pardoned, Johnston took up the role of keeper at Rock Island Light, serving there from 1853 to 1861.

Rock Island Light was last used as an official aid to navigation in 1958. The island was put up for sale in 1968 before being transferred to the Thousand Islands Bridge Authority in 1971. The New York State Office of Parks, Recreation and Historic Preservation assumed control of the property in 1976, at which time it was opened as Rock Island Lighthouse State Park. It was listed on the National Register of Historic Places two years later.

In 2007, the New York State Council of Parks, Recreation and Historical Preservation received a $900,000 grant from the US Department of Transportation as part of the Safe, Accountable, Flexible, Efficient Transportation Equity Act: A Legacy for Users. The grant, matched by $200,000 in state money, was for restoration and development of a method of presenting the lighthouse's historical information and context to the public. The restoration planned for expanding the dock, restoring the lighthouse and keeper's quarters, establishing a museum, and providing water, sewer and electrical service to the island.

=== A.E. Vickery shipwreck ===
The A.E. Vickery sank August 17, 1889 when it struck a shoal while entering the American Narrows destined for Wisers Distillery at Prescott, Ontario, Canada. The boat now rests near Rock Island and is an underwater diving attraction in the Thousand Islands.

== Rock Island Lighthouse State Park ==
Rock Island Lighthouse State Park
- Interactive map of Rock Island Lighthouse State Park
- Type: State park
- Location: Rock Island, Saint Lawrence River
- Nearest city: Clayton, New York
- Area: 4 acres (0.016 km^{2})
- Created: 1976
- Operator: New York State Office of Parks, Recreation and Historic Preservation
- Visitors: 6,941 (in 2014)
- Website: Rock Island Lighthouse State Park

Rock Island Lighthouse State Park is a four-acre (0.016 km^{2}) state park that encompasses the entirety of Rock Island and its former light station. It was created after New York State acquired the property in 1976.

Access to the island is possible only by private or chartered boat. The nearest public launch site is located at Grass Point State Park, which is approximately five minutes away by boat. Public boat tours are also available from Clayton. As of 2015, the park is open from 10 a.m. to 5 p.m. on weekends from Memorial Day until late June, and is open daily between late June and Labor Day. It is once again open only on weekends from Labor Day until Columbus Day.

The park allows for viewing the surrounding area from the top of the lighthouse, and includes a museum maintained in the former keeper's quarters. A fee is charged to access the museum and lighthouse.

== See also ==
- List of New York state parks
