= Barber's Point Light =

Barber's Point Light or Barbers Point Light may refer to:

- Barbers Point Light (Hawaii) on Oahu
- Barber's Point Light (New York) on Lake Champlain
