= Cape Vincent Breakwater Light =

Lighthouse in Cape Vincent, New York, US

Cape Vincent Light
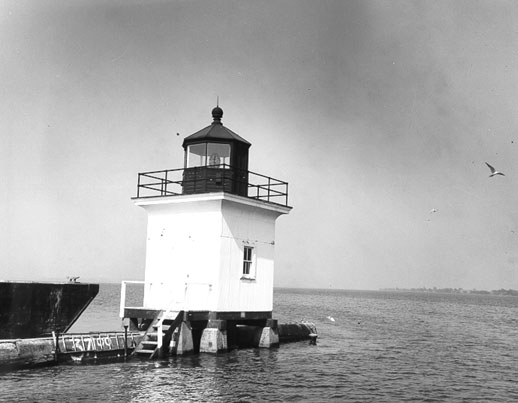
- Location: Originally on the Breakwater at Cape Vincent Harbor Cape Vincent, New York
- Coordinates: 44°7′10″N 76°19′56″W

Tower
- Constructed: 1901
- Height: 15 ft (4.6 m)
- Shape: Square
- Markings: White square enclosed structure
- Fog signal: None

Light
- First lit: 1912
- Deactivated: 1951
- Lens: Fifth Order fresnel lens
- Characteristic: Flashing red, dark sector; illuminated 307° of the horizon; dark sectors lying towards shore (as of 1941)

Cape Vincent Breakwater Light was a lighthouse on the breakwater protecting the harbor in the town of Cape Vincent, New York.

It has been moved to the Town Highway Department on New York State Route 12E.

It should not be confused with the nearby Tibbetts Point Light, an active lighthouse also in Cape Vincent.
