= Vermilion Light =

Lighthouse in Ohio, US

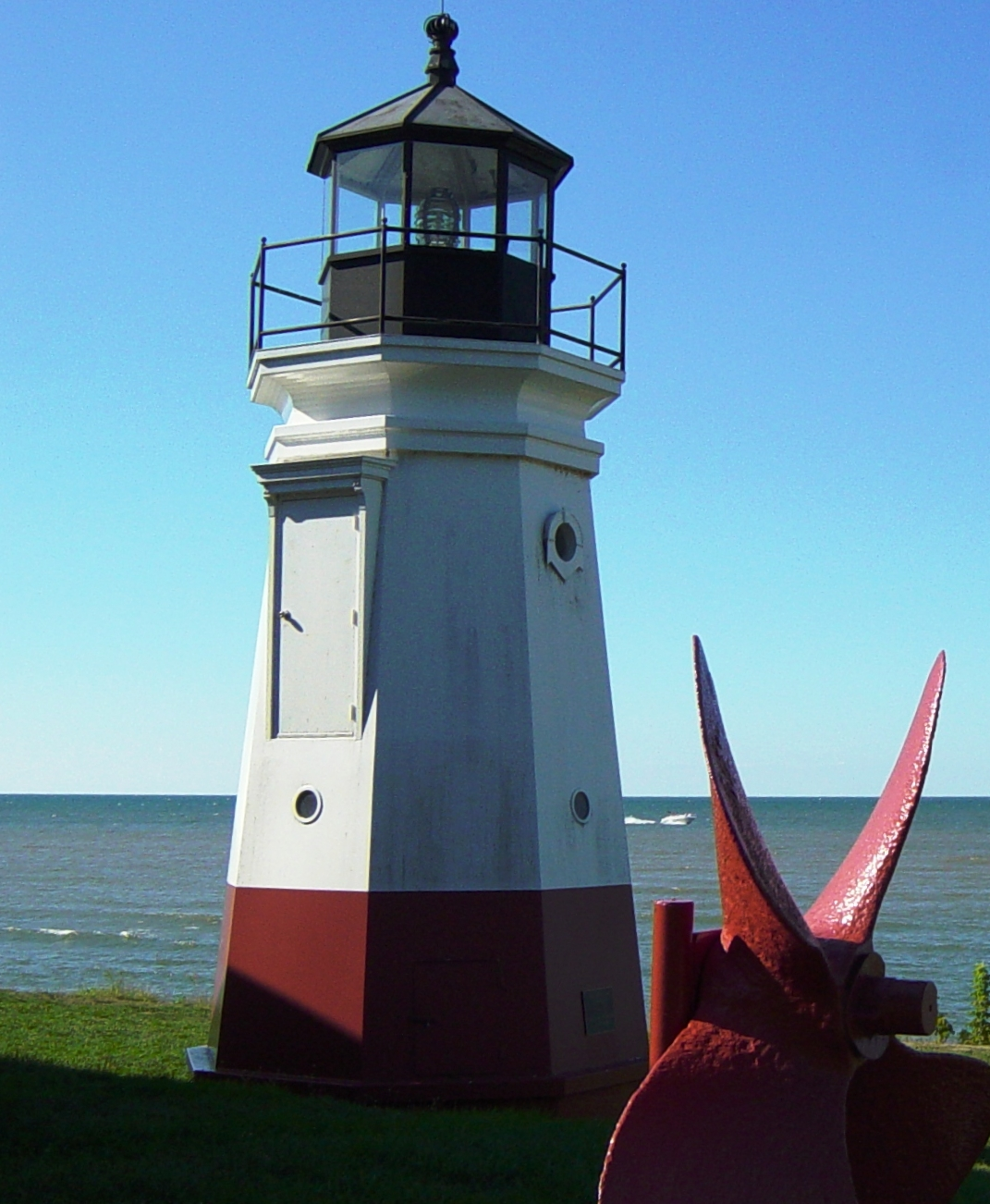
- The Vermilion Lighthouse on the shore of Lake Erie.
- Location: Vermilion, Ohio
- Coordinates: 41°25′28.8″N 82°21′59.7″W

Tower
- Constructed: 1877
- Height: Tower — 34 feet (10 m)
- Shape: octagon
- Markings: white w/red on base, black lantern & parapet

Light
- First lit: 1992
- Focal height: 11 m (36 ft)
- Lens: Fifth order Fresnel lens
- Intensity: 200 watt incandescent
- Characteristic: Steady red

The Vermilion Lighthouse is a lighthouse on the shores of Lake Erie in Vermilion, Ohio, USA. It is situated near the mouth of the Vermilion River. Erected on 23 October 1991 and dedicated on 6 June 1992, the lighthouse is illuminated by a 200 watt incandescent light bulb with a 5th order Fresnel lens. The lighthouse's United States Coast Guard-mandated light color is steady red.

The current lighthouse is a 34-foot (10.4 meters) replica of the previous Vermilion Lighthouse that had been removed in 1929. Following a multi-year fundraising campaign headed by local historian Theodore Wakefield, the replica was built by the Great Lakes Historical Society using $55,000 in public contributions. Designed by architect Robert Lee Tracht of Huron, Ohio, groundbreaking for the lighthouse occurred on 24 July 1991.

== History ==
The first Vermilion Lighthouse was a wooden structure that was built in 1847 by a $3,000 grant from the Congress of the United States. In 1859 the lighthouse received a $5000 renovation that rebuilt the structure and added a whale oil lamp and 6th order Fresnel lens. In 1866 Congress appropriated funds to build a new, permanent lighthouse made from iron. Cast in Buffalo, New York in three tapering octagonal sections, the iron used for the lighthouse was recycled from smooth-bored Columbian cannons that had been rendered obsolete after the Battle of Fort Sumter in the American Civil War. As Vermilion native Ernest Wakefield wrote, “The iron, therefore, of the 1877 Vermilion lighthouse echoed and resonated with the terrible trauma of the War Between the States.” The ironworkers used sand molds of three tapering rings, octahedral in shape.

Completed in 1877, the new lighthouse was 34 feet (10 m) high and had an oil lantern with a 5th order Fresnel lens. In 1919 the oil lantern was replaced with an acetylene light. After it was discovered to be leaning to one side, in 1929 the lighthouse was removed and replaced with an 18 feet (5.5 m) steel tower. The old iron lighthouse was transported back to Buffalo where it was later renovated and reinstalled as the East Charity Shoal Light on the Saint Lawrence Seaway in 1935.

== Sources ==
- The Inland Seas Maritime Museum
- The Lighthouse That Wanted to Stay Lit by Dr. Ernest H. Wakefield, published by Honors Press, 1 June 1992, ISBN 0-943465-54-0
