= Eatons Neck Light =

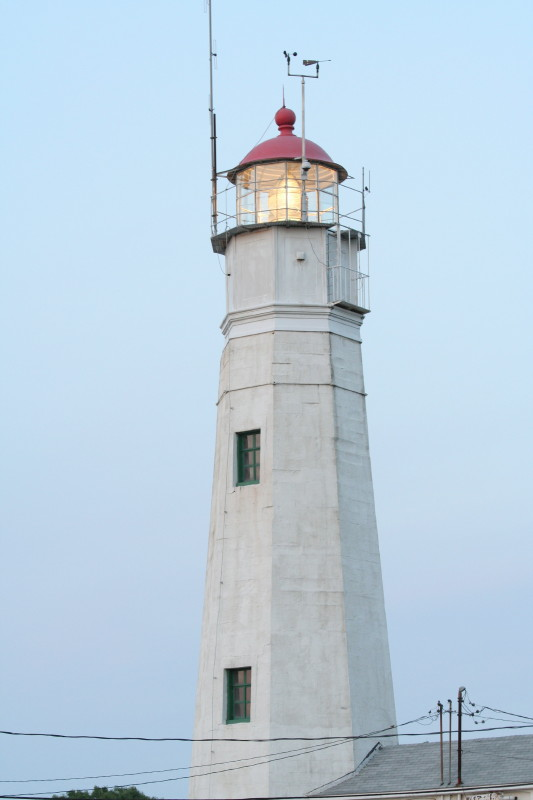
- Location: Station Eatons Neck, Eatons Neck Point at Huntington Bay and Long Island Sound off NY 25A, Huntington, New York
- Coordinates: 40°57′14.5″N 73°23′42.5″W

Tower
- Constructed: 1798
- Foundation: Dressed Stone/Timber
- Construction: Fieldstone with brick lining
- Automated: 1961
- Height: 73 feet (22 m)
- Shape: Octagonal pyramidal
- Heritage: National Register of Historic Places listed place
- Fog signal: Fog horn (3 s blast every 30 s)

Light
- First lit: 1799
- Deactivated: Active
- Focal height: 144 feet (44 m)
- Lens: 12 Lamps, 13-inch (330 mm) Reflectors (1838), Third Order Fresnel lens (current)
- Range: 18 nautical miles (33 km; 21 mi)
- Characteristic: Fixed white light
- Eatons Neck Light
- U.S. National Register of Historic Places
- Area: 10 acres (4.0 ha)
- Architect: McComb, John, Jr.
- NRHP reference No.: 73001273
- Added to NRHP: April 03, 1973

Eatons Neck Light has served as a navigational aid since its construction in 1798. Designed by John McComb, Jr.. It is one of only two 18th-century lighthouses still standing in New York State, the other being the Montauk Point Light.

== History ==
On March 14, 1798, $13,250 was appropriated for the lighthouse to be built. That June, ten acres were bought from John Gardiner for $500. On July 2, President John Adams authorized construction of the light. Construction of the lighthouse was completed by early December 1798.
On January 1, 1799, the light was first lit.
In 1837, the light failed an inspection because it was not visible at 10 miles (16 km). The following year, twelve lamps with 13-inch reflectors were installed to improve visibility.
From 1842 to 1858, several new reflectors were installed.
In 1867, Congress approved funds needed to renovate the lighthouse. The renovations included the removal of wooden stairs, installation of iron stairs with landings, the lining of interior walls with brick, the expansion of the keeper's quarters, and the installation of the steam fog signal.
In 1880, the keeper's quarters underwent renovation.
In 1907, the oil lamp was replaced with an oil vapor lamp. In 1921, the light was electrified. Forty years later, it was automated.

-- Data from the United States Coast Guard

The lighthouse was listed on the National Register of Historic Places in 1973.

== See also ==
- Fire Island Lighthouse
- Execution Rocks Light
- Stepping Stones Light
