= Bill Johnston (pirate) =

American pirate (1782–1870)

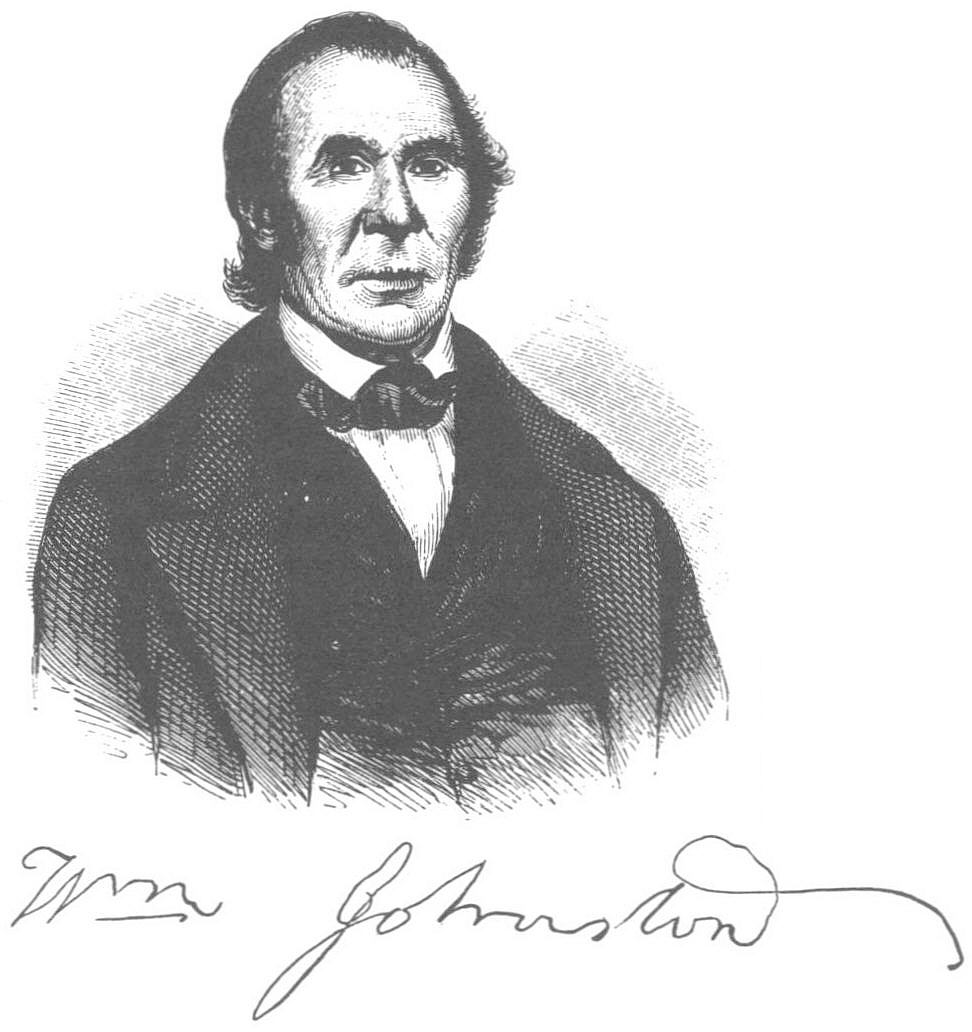
Bill Johnston c. 1858, drawn by Benson Lossing, published 1868

Bill Johnston (February 1, 1782 – February 17, 1870) was a Canadian-American smuggler, river pirate, and War of 1812 privateer. Born in Canada, Johnston was accused of spying in 1812 and he joined the American side of the war and lived the rest of his life in the United States.

== Early years ==
Bill Johnston spent his first 30 years as a loyal British subject. He was one of a dozen children born to British Loyalist parents who fled the American Revolution in 1781 to settle in Upper Canada (now Ontario).

As a boy, he helped carve a farm out of the primeval forest west of present-day Kingston. Starting when he was 16, he apprenticed to a local blacksmith for six years. At 22, he became a potash manufacturer, making use of the plentiful supply of ashes from burned forests. By 24, he captained his own schooner on eastern Lake Ontario. While he often carried legitimate cargo, he just as often smuggled tea and rum.

He married an American, Ann Randolph, in 1807 or early 1808 and began raising a family on his farm west of Kingston, Ontario. After five years of smuggling, Bill amassed enough profit to buy a Kingston store valued at an estimated $12,000, a small fortune in that era. By 1812, at 30, he was a rather prosperous merchant.

== Johnston in the War of 1812 ==
The War of 1812 began with American attacks on Britain's colonies in Canada. In May 1813, the Kingston military commander ordered Bill Johnston arrested, allegedly for spying. Johnston escaped and paddled to Sackets Harbor, New York, in a canoe. The British then confiscated his property. He vowed revenge on the British and pledged himself to the American commander of the United States Navy in Lake Ontario.

For two years, Bill Johnston made war in the Thousand Islands in a gig—a fast, light rowboat. Propelled by six oarsmen, this small craft gave him a distinct advantage in the shallow and tight waterways around the Thousand Islands. If trapped, Johnston's men could easily carry the boat across an island to escape.

Through the warm months of 1813 and 1814, he spied on the British, attacked their supply boats, robbed mail couriers, burned ships, and participated in the battles of Sackets Harbor and Crysler's Farm.

After the war, Bill and his family lived briefly in several upstate New York towns. They settled in Clayton in 1834. He established a waterfront shop and continued smuggling tea and rum to Canada. Ironically, the US revenue service paid him to spy on Canadian smugglers coming into the US.

== Johnston joins the Upper Canadian Rebels ==
In early December, 1837, a small band of men, led by former Toronto mayor, William Lyon Mackenzie rebelled against British rule. His small force was quickly defeated at Montgomery's Tavern, and Mackenzie fled to Navy Island, near the Canada–US border. While there, he proclaimed the Republic of Canada and attempted to recruit an army of Canadian republicans and American sympathizers. On 29 December, an Anglo-Canadian force crossed the icy river and destroyed Mackenzie's supply ship, the Caroline, during which an American sailor was killed.

The Caroline raid enraged Johnston. He left his home and joined Mackenzie's forces. Mackenzie then appointed him admiral of the eastern navy, even though the rebels possessed no navy.

In 1838, rebels based in the US, calling themselves either Patriots or Hunters, attacked Canada at least seven times. Johnston helped plan an attack on Upper Canada near Detroit led by Donald McLeod in February 1838. The same month, he organized an attack on Kingston and temporarily occupied a Canadian island. He aborted the latter invasion because the British learned of his plans.

== Destruction of the Sir Robert Peel ==
Bill Johnston's most famous undertaking, the one that earned him his pirate moniker, occurred early on the morning of May 30, 1838. Following a plan Johnston hatched with Donald McLeod (a general in the Patriot army), they and twenty others, mostly Canadians, set out to capture the passenger steamer, the Sir Robert Peel. They intended to use the Peel to transport rebel troops to Canada.

Shortly after midnight, the Peel docked at Wellesley Island to load firewood for its boilers. Johnston's men landed 500 yards downstream and set out through the woods towards the Peel. Nine men got lost in the dark. Undeterred, Johnston, McLeod and 11 others attacked the ship. They had hustled the 80 passengers and crew at gunpoint to the wharf. Johnston ordered the ship untied and it drifted downstream. Rebel leaders had promised to send men to help run the ship, but they failed to arrive. Since none of Johnston's men could restart the boilers, he ordered them to loot the ship and burn it. With cries of "Remember the Caroline," they set it aflame and retreated in their boats.

American authorities soon arrested 13 of Johnston's pirate crew. A sympathetic jury acquitted the first man put on trial. The remaining prisoners were released for fear of the same result. Johnston remained at large and even issued a proclamation of war against Britain in which he admitted destroying the Peel. The British and American forces each sent a small naval force and army into the Thousand Islands searching for Johnston. For a brief time, the US allowed British vessels to search for Johnston in American waters, much to the chagrin of many New York citizens. (In mid-July 1838, the US asked the British to stay out, so angry were its citizens to see foreign warships in their waters. The search continued on both sides of the border.) Johnston knew every cave and secret glen in the archipelago. His children, especially his daughter Kate, smuggled him supplies throughout that summer. Despite months of effort, the searchers failed to find him and the forces involved were reduced.

== Battle of the Windmill and Johnston's arrest ==
In November 1838, a force of 250 American Hunter Patriots crossed the St. Lawrence River at Ogdensburg, New York for an abortive attack on Prescott. After the attack failed on Prescott, the Hunter Patriots occupied the hamlet of Newport. Later known as the Battle of the Windmill, the invaders were forced to surrender after having been surrounded by British forces for five days. On the first day of the battle, Johnston ferried supplies to the Canadian shore and helped to refloat two rebel schooners that ran aground on the mud flats.

Johnston surrendered to US authorities shortly after the Battle of the Windmill. He claimed he was tired of running. Johnston faced numerous charges for his rebel activities and the Peel raid. In many cases, juries refused to convict him. When he was jailed, he escaped when the mood struck him.

== Later years ==
Johnston spent the remainder of his years as a smuggler and tavern owner. On 12 April 1853, Johnston was appointed as keeper of the Rock Island Lighthouse. He spent his last years in Clayton living in his son Samuel's hotel, the Walton House.
