= NEPCO 140 oil spill =

Oil spill in New York

Coordinates: 44°19′N 76°00′W

The NEPCO 140 Oil Spill took place in 1976 near Clayton, New York when the NEPCO 140 ran aground while traveling inland, spilling an estimated 300,000 US gallons (1,100 m^{3}) of oil into the Saint Lawrence River.

== Oil spill ==
On June 23, 1976, the tugboat Eileen C was pushing the NEPCO 140 barge, filled with crude oil, when it ran aground in the American Narrows, off Wellesley Island, in the Thousand Islands region. The Captain had not made a large enough adjustment to his course, when realizing the vessel was off-track in the thick fog. Upon running aground, the barge ruptured two tanks and began leaking oil. It then backed-off the rock and resumed its upriver journey. The barge again ran aground, four miles (6 km) further upriver and ruptured another tank on a shoal near Mason Point, while trying to set anchor, per the U.S. Coast Guard's orders. The barge leaked oil into the river for more than a day. The spill was carried-over an 80-mile (130 km) section of the St. Lawrence River, by the river’s swift current. Shoreline, wildlife, rocks, and boats were covered with oil, as far downriver as Massena, New York and Brockville, Ontario. Oil penetrated into extensive marshland areas. At the time of the accident, the spill was the worst inland oil spill in North American history.

== Cleanup ==
It was difficult for clean-up officials to fully document the damage to the St. Lawrence River ecosystem. An attempt was made to determine the mortality of wildlife. A count of animal mortality included 226 waterfowl and ducks and 508 birds, mammals and amphibians. Several hundred waterfowl, ducks, other birds, and countless fish were harmed or killed by the spill. Chemical shoreline cleaners were used, much like what was used during the Exxon Valdez oil spill. Neighbors worked hand-in-hand with government employees, students and national volunteers for months. Clean-up of the oil was accomplished primarily by intensive hand labor, through power-washing shorelines and hand cutting and hauling contaminated underwater and marsh vegetation. The clean-up was terminated on October 22, 1976; 122 days after the spill. However, many areas with oil contamination were not cleaned-up and the oil was left to degrade naturally. The United States alleged it spent $8,062,981 to clean its territorial waters and reimbursed Canada, pursuant to an executive agreement for their $768,265 spent.
