= Camp Dudley Road Historic District =

Historic district in New York, United States

- U.S. National Register of Historic Places
- U.S. Historic district
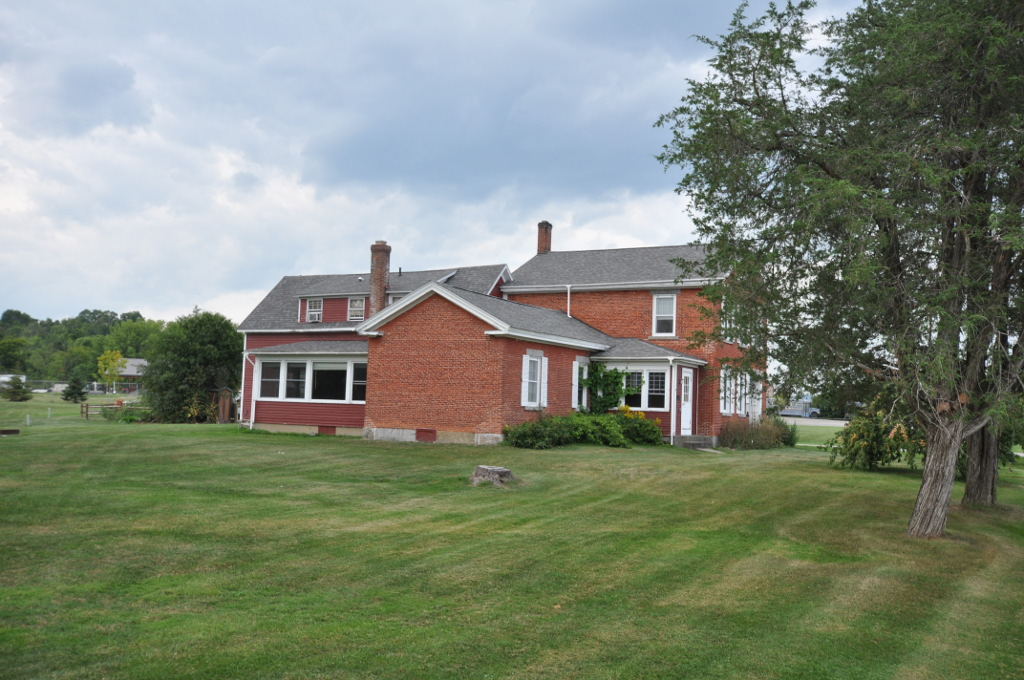

- Location within New York Location within the United States
- Location: Roughly bounded by NY 22, Stacy Br., Lake Champlain and the Westport village line, Westport, New York
- Coordinates: 44°9′15″N 73°25′4″W
- Area: 1,050 acres (420 ha)
- Architect: White, Stanford; Unknown
- Architectural style: Greek Revival, Late Victorian, Late 19th And Early 20th Century American Movements
- NRHP reference No.: 93001136
- Added to NRHP: October 21, 1993

Camp Dudley Road Historic District is a national historic district located at Westport, in Essex County, New York. The district contains 131 contributing buildings, one contributing site, and one contributing structure. It consists of an agricultural landscape and includes late-19th and early-20th century seasonal developments. Among the buildings are vernacular farmhouses in a variety of styles, barn complexes, a stone schoolhouse built in 1816, Skenewood Estate, the Stable Inn properties, Germain property, "Kenjockety," and Barber's Point Lighthouse. Camp Dudley, the oldest continuing boy's camp is located on a 250-acre (1.0 km^{2}) parcel in the southern part of the district.

It was listed on the National Register of Historic Places in 1993.
