= East Charity Shoal Light =

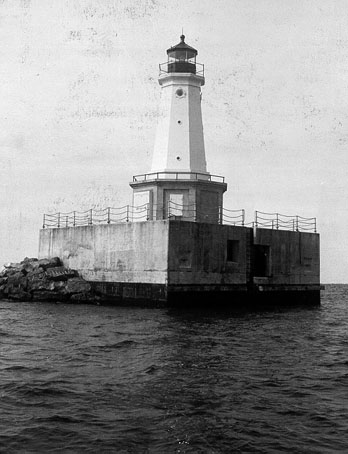
- Location: Lake Ontario, approximately 6 mi (9.7 km) SW of entrance to Saint Lawrence River off Tibbetts Point Light
- Coordinates: 44°2′12″N 76°28′54″W

Tower
- Constructed: 1877 (in Ohio); 1935 (in New York)
- Foundation: Concrete
- Construction: Cast iron
- Automated: 1939
- Height: 16 feet (4.9 m)
- Shape: Frustum of an octagon
- Markings: White with black lantern
- Heritage: National Register of Historic Places listed place

Light
- First lit: 1877 (in Ohio); 1935 (in New York)
- Focal height: 52 feet (16 m)
- Lens: Fourth-order Fresnel lens
- Range: 9 miles (14 km)
- Characteristic: Flashing red 4s (Fl R 4s)
- East Charity Shoal Light
- U.S. National Register of Historic Places
- Location: Lake Ontario
- Area: Less than one acre
- Built: 1935
- Architectural style: Lighthouse
- MPS: Light Stations of the United States MPS
- NRHP reference No.: 08000231
- Added to NRHP: March 27, 2008

East Charity Shoal Light is an offshore lighthouse located near the Saint Lawrence River's entrance in northeastern Lake Ontario, due south of the city of Kingston, Ontario and approximately five miles (8 km) southwest of Wolfe Island. It is on the southeast rim of a 3,300-foot-diameter (1,000 m) submerged circular depression known as Charity Shoal Crater that may be the remnants of a meteorite impact.

The lighthouse is located in Jefferson County, New York, near the Canada–United States border.

The tower originally served Vermilion Light Station in Ohio from 1877 to 1929, and was installed at its current New York location in 1935. The lighthouse was listed on the National Register of Historic Places in March 2008. East Charity Shoal Light has been privately owned since 2009, however easements are in place to maintain the light's function as a navigational aid.

== Description ==
East Charity Shoal Light sits upon a reinforced concrete pier, 50 feet (15 m) long on each side, that rises approximately 18 feet (5.5 m) above Lake Ontario. The pier is built on a wooden crib foundation with protective riprap. The tower includes a single-story concrete deckhouse that is 11 feet (3.4 m) tall and 20 feet (6.1 m) in diameter. Above the deckhouse rises a three-story cast iron white tower, topped with a lantern and lantern gallery that is painted black. The light's interior includes a basement and five stories. The total height of the pier and tower is 56 feet (17 m). The automated beacon is powered by a solar array, sits at a focal height of 52 feet (16 m), and is visible for nine miles (14 km).

East Charity Shoal Light is not open to the public, but it is visible from Tibbetts Point Light on a clear day.

== History ==
The tower was constructed from recast obsolescent cannon after the Battle of Fort Sumter in the American Civil War. It originally served Vermilion Light Station in Ohio from 1877 to 1929, but was removed after it was damaged in an ice storm. A replica of the tower was installed at Vermilion in 1991.

Prior to the installation of the East Charity Shoal Light, the shoal was the cause of at least one shipwreck, when the Rosedale grounded upon the rocks on December 5, 1897. The shoal was surveyed in 1900, and was found to be an area roughly 3,000 feet (910 m) long that was covered in water approximately 10 feet (3.0 m) deep. A buoy was installed on the eastern edge of the shoal, however groundings continued to occur, leading the United States Lighthouse Service to initiate the installation of a more permanent navigational aid.

Construction of the concrete pier for East Charity Shoal Light began in 1934, and the tower was installed in 1935. The tower was originally lit with a fourth-order Fresnel lens and a 1,300 candlepower light fueled by acetylene.

On July 23, 2008, the Secretary of the Interior identified East Charity Shoal Light as surplus under the National Historic Lighthouse Preservation Act of 2000. As such, the property was offered by the federal government for no cost to eligible agencies, institutions or organizations, with the agreement that the property would be maintained and made available for educational, recreational, or historic preservation purposes. No organization eligible under the NHLHPA was found to take ownership of the lighthouse.

In 2009, East Charity Shoal Light was put up for auction and was eventually purchased for $25,501 by Cyrena Nolan of Dallas, Texas on August 27, 2009. At the time of the purchase, Nolan intended to convert the lighthouse into a vacation home.

Although the property was transferred to private ownership, the light remains operational and the Aid to Navigation (ATON) remains the property of the United States Coast Guard. An easement is in place to allow for access to maintain or modify the navigational light. The easement also disallows construction of any structure that would interfere with visibility of the light.
