= A. E. Vickery (schooner) =

Wooden three-masted schooner built in 1861

History

United States
- Name: J. B. Penfield
- Launched: July 1861
- Renamed: A. E. Vickery 25 February 1884
- Fate: Sank 17 August 1889

General characteristics
- Type: Schooner
- Length: 136 ft 2 in (41.50 m)
- Beam: 26 ft 2 in (7.98 m)
- Draft: 10 ft 8 in (3.25 m)

A.E. Vickery was a wooden three-masted schooner built in 1861 and measured 136.2 ft. x 26.2 ft. x 10.8 ft. The ship was launched in July 1861 at Three Mile Bay, New York, United States as J. B. Penfield, and under that name sailed through the Welland Canal on her way from Detroit, Michigan, to Oswego, New York. She was renamed A. E. Vickery on 25 February 1884 and sank on 17 August 1889 when she struck a shoal while entering the American Narrows with a cargo of 21,000 bushels of corn destined for Wisers Distillery at Prescott, Ontario, Canada. The wreck now rests at a depth of about 35 metres (115 ft) near Rock Island Light at position 44°16.820′N 76°01.183′W.

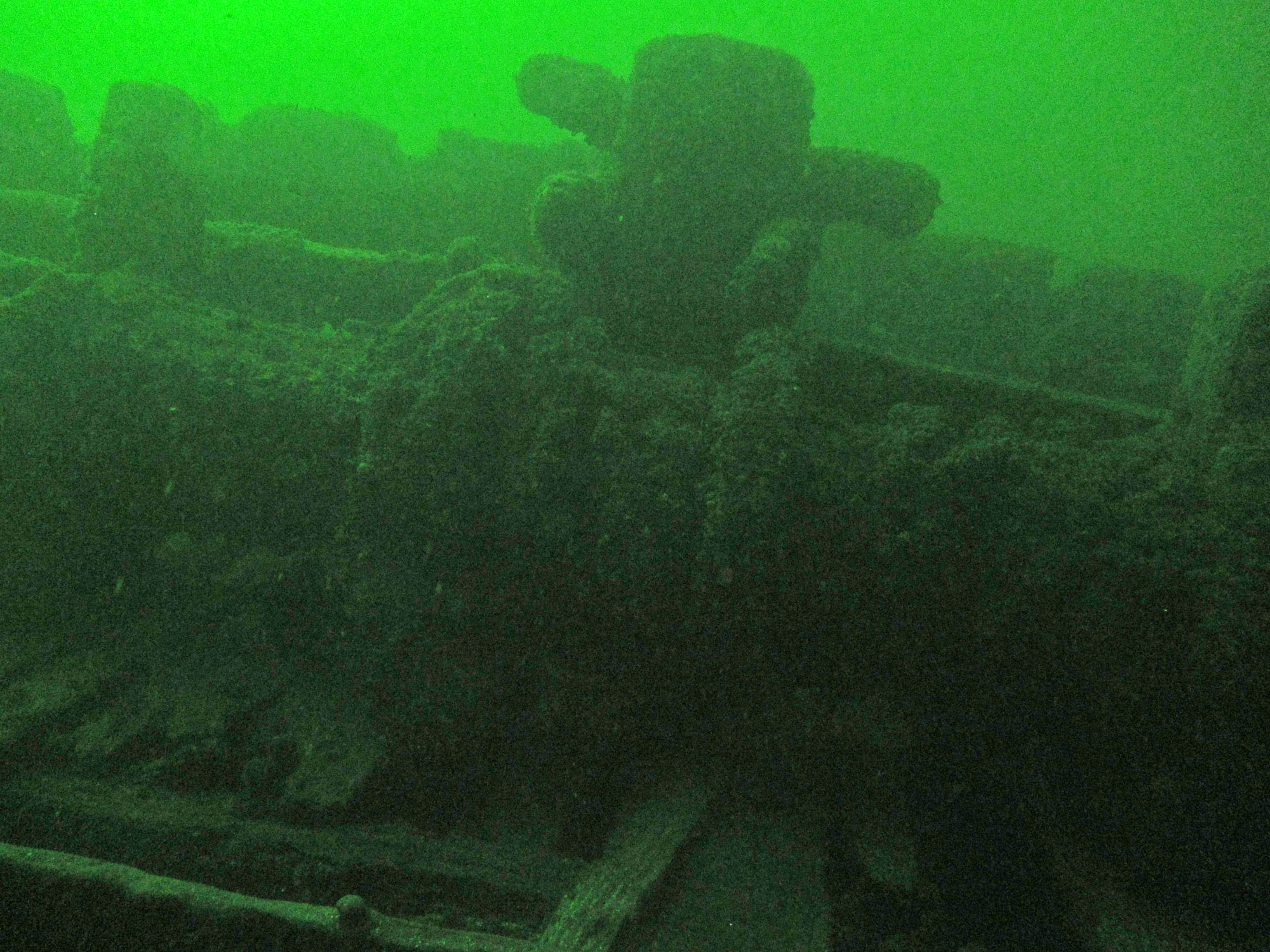
Windlass of the A. E. Vickery, shipwreck located near Clayton, New York, USA, 14 June 2014

== See also ==
- Shipwreck
- Thousand Islands
- Alexandria Bay, New York
