= Oak Orchard Light =

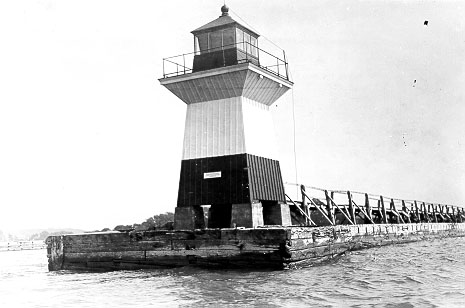
- Location: On Lake Ontario, at Point Breeze in New York
- Coordinates: 43°22′16″N 78°11′35″W

Tower
- Constructed: 1871
- Height: 10.5 m (34 ft)

Light
- First lit: 1871
- Deactivated: 1916
- Focal height: 11 m (36 ft)
- Characteristic: F W

Oak Orchard Light was a lighthouse that operated on the shores of Lake Ontario, in New York, United States, at Point Breeze from 1871 to 1916. In 2010 a local community group built a historically accurate replica of the lighthouse near the original site on the east side of Oak Orchard Creek. Originally it had been built at the end of a long wooden pier on the west side.
