= Latimer Reef Light =

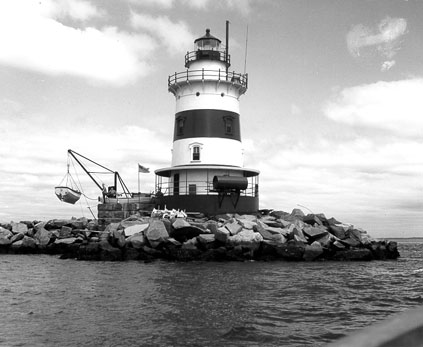
- Location: In Fisher's Island Sound, 1-mile (1.6 km) NW of East Point on Fishers Island, New York
- Coordinates: 41°18′18.0″N 71°56′00.0″W

Tower
- Constructed: 1804
- Foundation: Cast iron/Concrete caisson
- Construction: Cast iron/Brick
- Automated: 1974
- Height: 15 m (49 ft)
- Shape: Conical
- Markings: White tower/Brown band midway/Brown base
- Heritage: National Register of Historic Places listed place
- Fog signal: Bell: 2 strokes ev 15s

Light
- First lit: 1884
- Focal height: 55 feet (17 m)
- Lens: Fifth order Fresnel Lens (original), 12 inches (300 mm) (current)
- Range: 9 nautical miles (17 km; 10 mi)
- Characteristic: Flashing White, 6 secs
- Latimer Reef Light Station
- U.S. National Register of Historic Places
- Area: less than one acre
- Architect: U.S. Lighthouse Board
- MPS: Light Stations of the United States MPS
- NRHP reference No.: 06000635
- Added to NRHP: July 19, 2006

Latimer Reef Light is a sparkplug lighthouse on Latimer's Reef in Fishers Island Sound. The lighthouse is located one mile northwest of East Point on Fisher's Island, Suffolk County, New York. Originally called Latemore's Reef after James Latemore.

== History ==
On July 9, 2008, the United States Secretary of the Interior identified Latimer Reef Light Station as surplus under the National Historic Lighthouse Preservation Act of 2000. The property was described as

Latimer Reef Light was completed in 1884. It sits in 18 feet of water at the western end offshore of Fisher's Island Sound ... The light includes a 30-foot-diameter (9.1 m) cylindrical caisson foundation painted brown. The caisson is filled with concrete and surrounded by riprap. This foundation supports a 46 foot cast iron superstructure that includes a four-story conical tower topped by a one-story cylindrical watch room and decagonal lantern. The tower, watch room and lantern are painted white with a brown stripe a full story tall around the tower's third story.

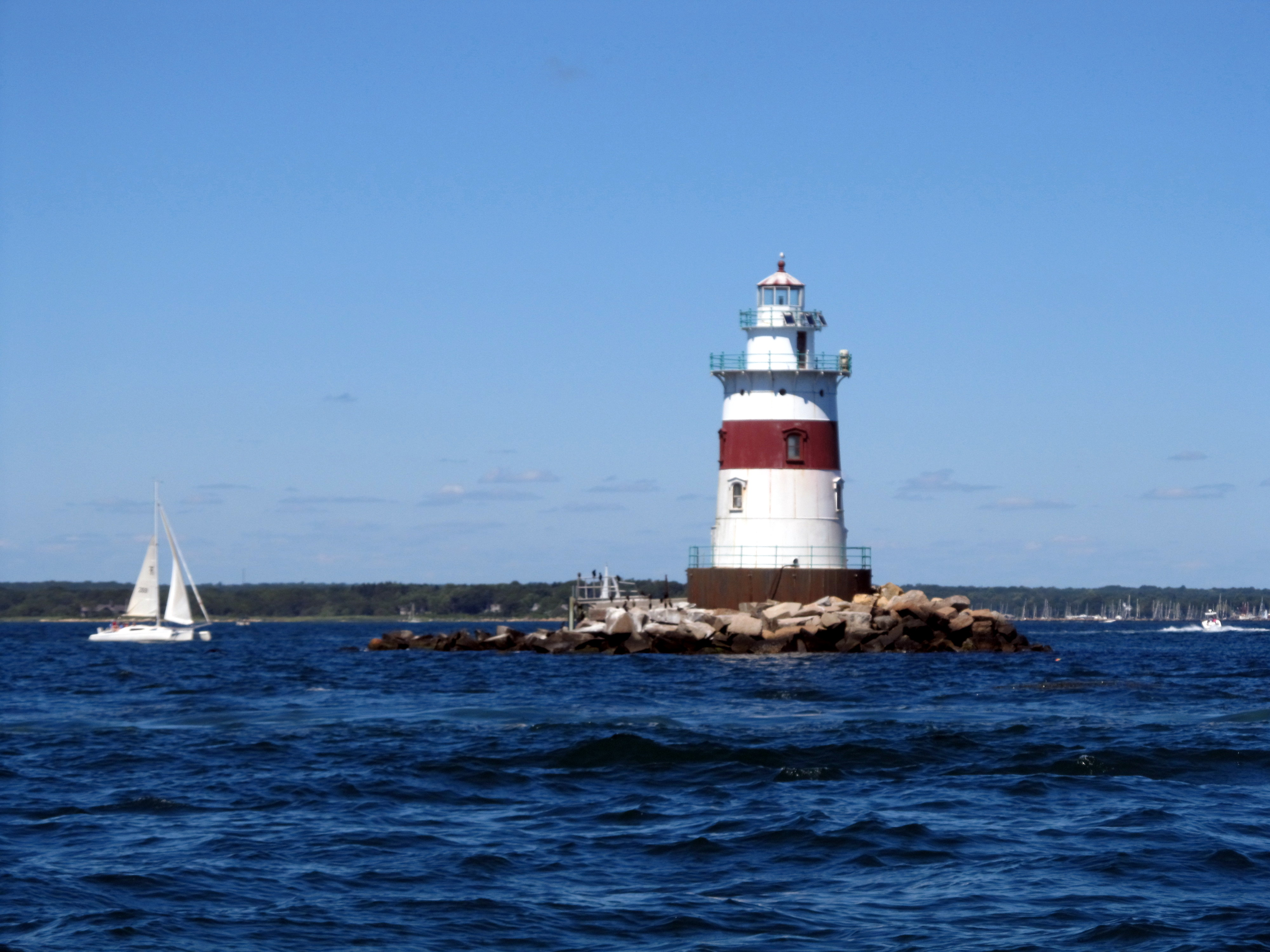
2013 photo

The property is listed in the National Register of Historic Places (#06000635, July 19, 2006). The property must be maintained in accordance with the Secretary of Interior's Standards for Rehabilitation. Historic covenants will be incorporated into the quitclaim Deed.

The easement on the property states that "1) a 360 degree arc of visibility easement; 2) an easement an unrestricted right of accessing, to and across the Property to maintain, operate, service, repair and install equipment as necessary to support its ATON mission; 3) the unrestricted right to relocate or add any aid to navigation or communications towers and equipment (along with necessary right or egress/ingress), or make any changes on any portion of the Property as may be necessary for navigation/public safety purposes; and 4) an easement to the USCG for the purpose of an electronically, 80 decibel fog signal and flashing red light.

The Archives Center at the Smithsonian National Museum of American History has a collection (#1055) of souvenir postcards of lighthouses and has digitized 272 of these and made them available online. These include postcards of Latimer Reef Light with links to customized nautical charts provided by National Oceanographic and Atmospheric Administration.
