= Cold Spring Harbor Light =

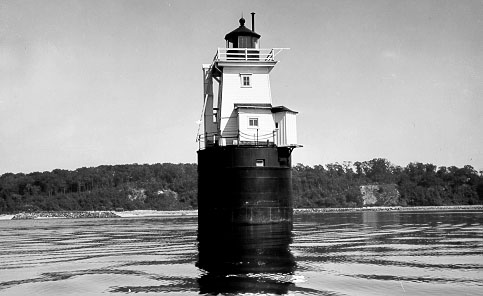
- Cold Spring Harbor Light
- Location: Entrance of Cold Spring Harbor on Long Island
- Coordinates: Preserved light 40°54′26.0″N 73°30′35.5″W; Active aid 40°54′51.0″N 73°29′35.2″W

Tower
- Foundation: Cast iron/concrete caisson
- Construction: Orig Wood
- Height: Original: 35 feet (11 m) tower on caisson, 44 feet (13 m) above sea level Current: 37 feet (11 m)
- Shape: Skeletal/Orig square pyramidal

Light
- First lit: 1890
- Deactivated: 1965
- Focal height: 11 m (36 ft)
- Lens: Fourth order, Fresnel
- Range: Current: 7 miles (11 km)
- Characteristic: Original:Fixed red light, Orig White w/black lantern Current: Fl. White w/fixed red sector

Cold Spring Harbor Light was a lighthouse located in Cold Spring Harbor on the north shore of New York's Long Island. It was built in 1890 to mark a shoal at the entrance to Cold Spring Harbor. After the lighthouse was deactivated in 1965, the original light and tower were purchased by a private individual and moved to its current location on land, one mile (1.6 km) to the southwest. An automated light tower and day beacon were erected on the original caisson, and continue to serve as a navigation aid.

== History ==
On March 3, 1875, $20,000 was appropriated for the construction of the light, which began in 1889. The light's construction upon a caisson in Cold Spring Harbor was finished in 1890, and it was first lit on January 31 of that year. The light was refitted with an oil vapor lamp in 1929.

The light was deactivated in 1965, to be replaced with an automated light tower. After purchasing the old structure for $1, a local resident had the lighthouse moved to the mainland where it was reinstalled on private property. The local resident, known as "Lady Glen", reputedly "had fond memories of the lighthouse, including one keeper who kept a piano at the station. When he played, the music could be heard drifting across the water."

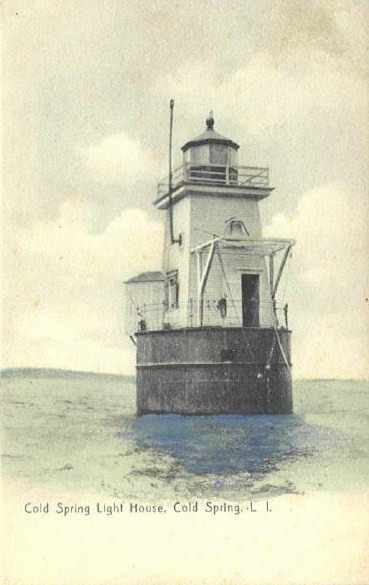
Postcard, about 1905

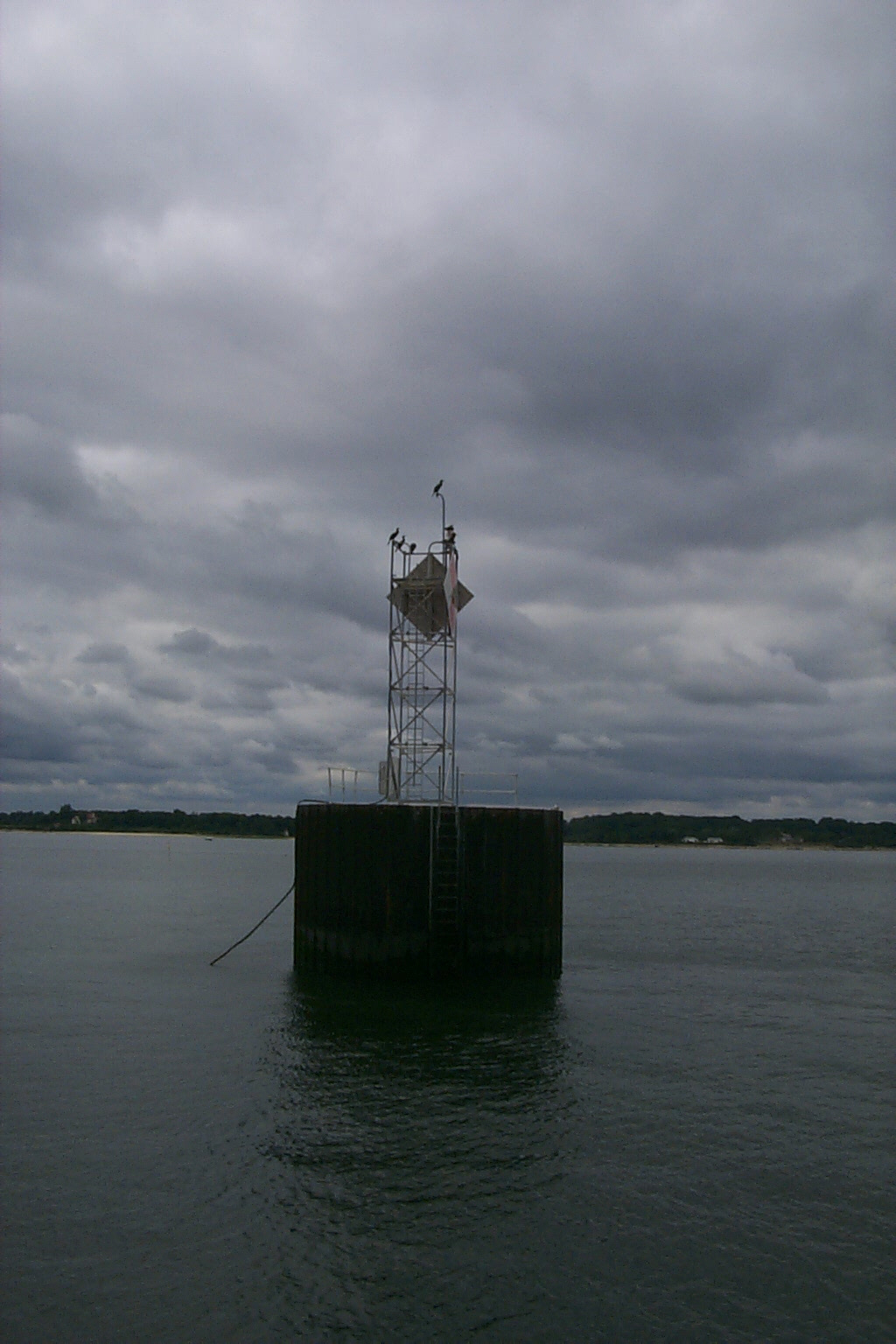
Modern Light, 1999
