= Fort Niagara Light =

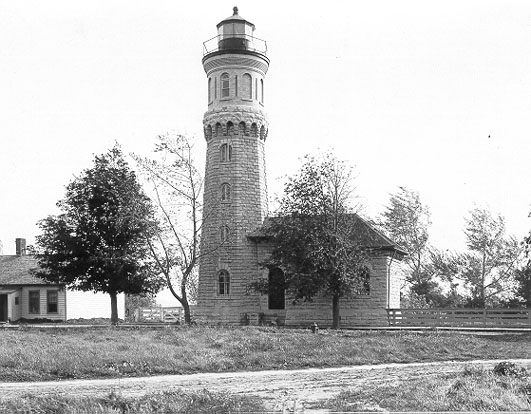
- Old Fort Niagara Lighthouse
- Location: Old Fort Niagara on Lake Ontario
- Coordinates: 43°15′42″N 79°3′48″W

Tower
- Constructed: 1872
- Foundation: Natural/emplaced
- Construction: Limestone, brick lining
- Height: 61 feet (19 m)
- Shape: Frustum of an octagon
- Markings: Natural with black lantern
- Heritage: National Register of Historic Places listed place

Light
- First lit: 1872
- Deactivated: 1993
- Focal height: 91 feet (28 m)
- Lens: Fourth-order fresnel lens
- Range: 10 nautical miles (19 km; 12 mi)
- Characteristic: (Oc W 4s)

Fort Niagara Light is an inactive lighthouse on the Niagara River on the south shore of Lake Ontario in New York state. It is located on the grounds of Fort Niagara. This light house is complimented by two range lights in Niagara-on-the-Lake built on 1904.

== History ==
The lighthouse was established in 1782 atop the "French Castle", a structure still located within Old Fort Niagara. The current tower was first lit in 1872, having been removed from the French Castle to allow for more room for officer's quarters. The light was deactivated in 1996 and was replaced by a light beacon at the US Coast Guard Station Niagara.

The foundation was natural/emplaced and the lighthouse was constructed out of limestone with a brick lining. The tower is octagonal in shape with a black lantern. The original lens was a fourth order Fresnel lens installed in 1859

National Register Status: LISTED; Reference #84002809 Name of Listing: FORT NIAGARA LIGHT (U.S. COAST GUARD/GREAT LAKES TR)

Part of Old Fort Niagara National Historic Landmark; First two towers constructed on the fort; Third (current) tower constructed south of fort; Tower replaced by modern beacon in order to save trees obstructing lantern in 1993.

== Cultural ==
The Archives Center at the Smithsonian National Museum of American History has a collection (#1055) of souvenir postcards of lighthouses and has digitized 272 of these and made them available online. These include postcards of Fort Niagara Light with links to customized nautical charts provided by National Oceanographic and Atmospheric Administration.

== See also ==
- Fort Niagara
