= Buffalo North Breakwater East End Light =

Lighthouse in New York, United States

Coordinates: 42°52′40″N 78°53′22″W

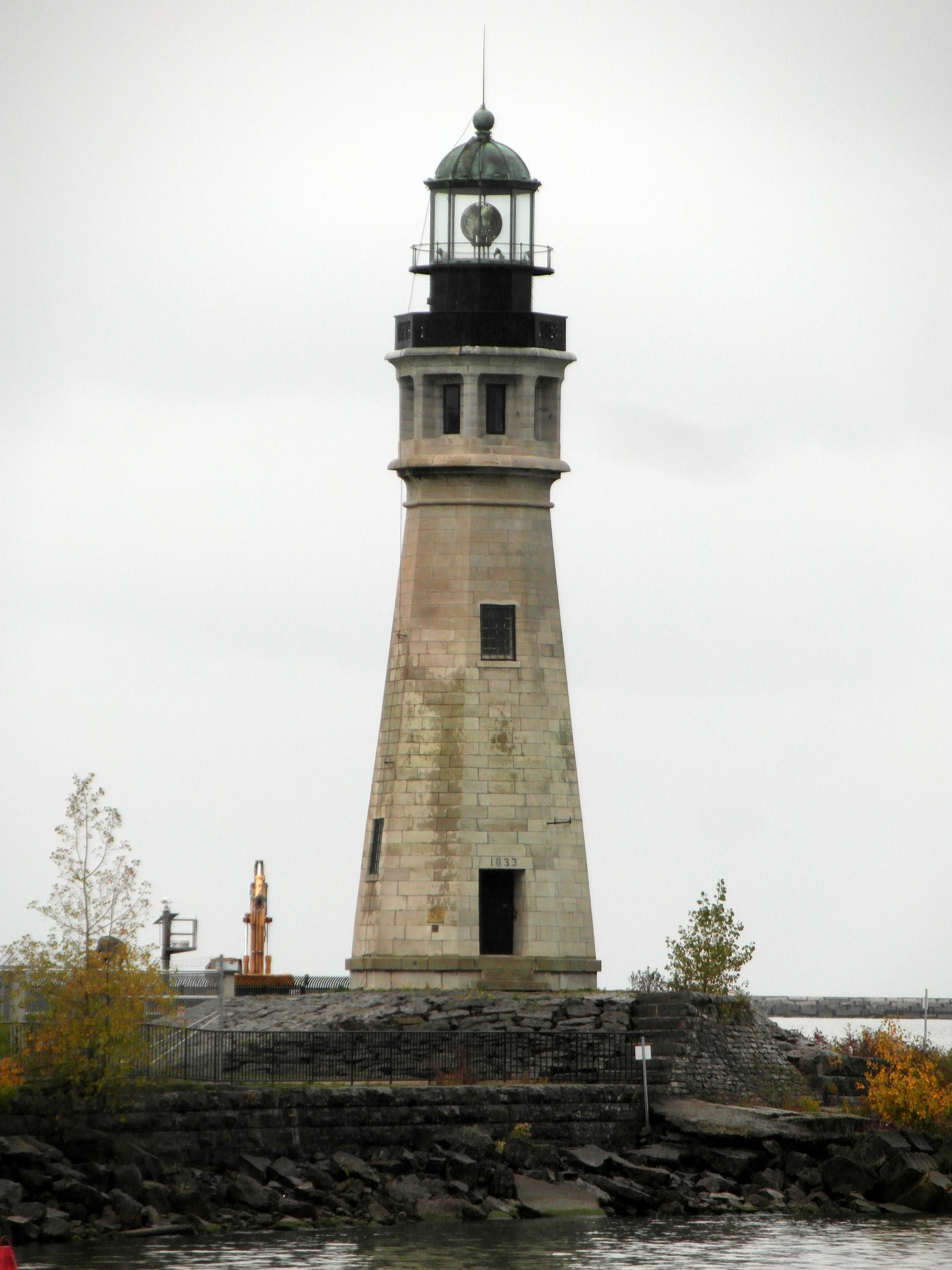
Buffalo North breakwater East end Light lighthouse

The Buffalo North Breakwater East end Light was a lighthouse originally located on the North breakwater East End of Buffalo harbor, New York. It has since been relocated from the North Harbor entrance and sits on display near the Buffalo Main Light on the grounds of the United States Coast Guard station at the end of Furman Blvd on the Buffalo waterfront.

== History ==
The lighthouse was established and lit in 1903, automated in 1960 and was deactivated in 1985. The foundation materials was stone filled crib and the lighthouse was constructed out of boiler plate cast iron. The tower was bottle shaped and 29 feet high. The tower was white. The original lens installed in 1903 was a sixth order Fresnel lens.

Chronology:

- 1903: The original lens was installed in 1903 and was a sixth order Fresnel
- 1960: The light was automated in 1960.
- 1985: The light was deactivated in 1985.
- 2000: Lighthouse is open to the public and managed by the Buffalo Lighthouse association, Inc. There are no existing keepers quarters on existing sound signal building.
