= Coxsackie Light =

Lighthouse in New York, United States

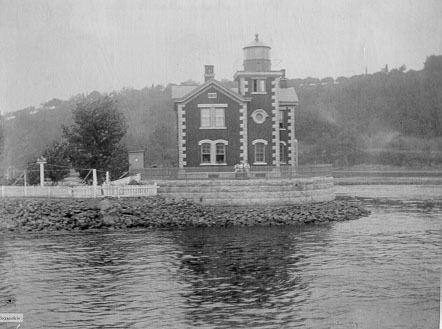
- Location: Hudson River at Coxsackie, New York
- Coordinates: 42°22′47″N 73°47′41″W

Tower
- Constructed: 1830
- Construction: Brick
- Height: 32 feet (9.8 m)
- Shape: Square
- Markings: Red square tower with granite trimmings in northeasterly angle of red dwelling on stone pier
- Fog signal: None

Light
- First lit: 1868
- Deactivated: 1940
- Lens: Sixth Order Fresnel lens
- Characteristic: Fixed White

Coxsackie Light was a lighthouse near the town of Coxsackie, New York, on the northerly end of the Low island northerly of Coxsackie island and on the westerly side of the main channel of the Hudson River.

The lighthouse was first established in 1830 and the last tower was first lit in 1868. The lighthouse was deactivated in 1940. The lighthouse was a red square tower with granite trimmings and a red dwelling on stone pier. The lantern housing was black. The light was 32 feet high fixed white light. The original lens was a sixth order Fresnel lens.

The Archives Center at the Smithsonian National Museum of American History has a collection (#1055) of souvenir postcards of lighthouses and has digitized 272 of these and made them available online. These include postcards of Coxsackie Light with links to customized nautical charts provided by National Oceanographic and Atmospheric Administration.
