= Sodus Outer Light =

Lighthouse in New York, United States

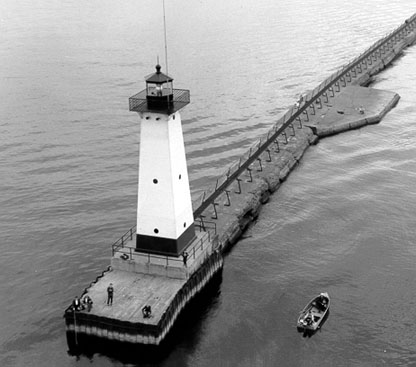
- Current cast iron tower (USCG)
- Location: Sodus Bay, Lake Ontario, New York
- Coordinates: 43°16′38.3″N 76°58′26.4″W

Tower
- Constructed: 1858
- Construction: Cast iron
- Automated: Yes
- Height: 49 feet (15 m)
- Shape: Square pyramidal tower
- Markings: White
- Fog signal: none

Light
- First lit: 1938 (current tower)
- Focal height: 51 feet (16 m)
- Lens: Fourth Order Fresnel lens
- Range: 10 nautical miles (19 km; 12 mi)
- Characteristic: Isophase White, 6s

Sodus Outer Light is a lighthouse at the end of the western of the two piers defining the channel from Lake Ontario into Sodus Bay, New York, first established in 1858. In 1938, the wood tower was replaced with the current cast iron structure, and the light was converted from kerosene to electricity.

== Gallery ==
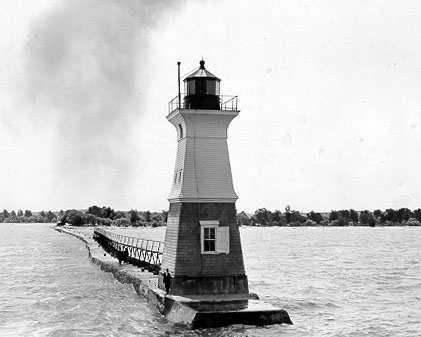
Original wooden structure
