= Fire Island Lighthouse =

Lighthouse in New York, United States

Fire Island Light
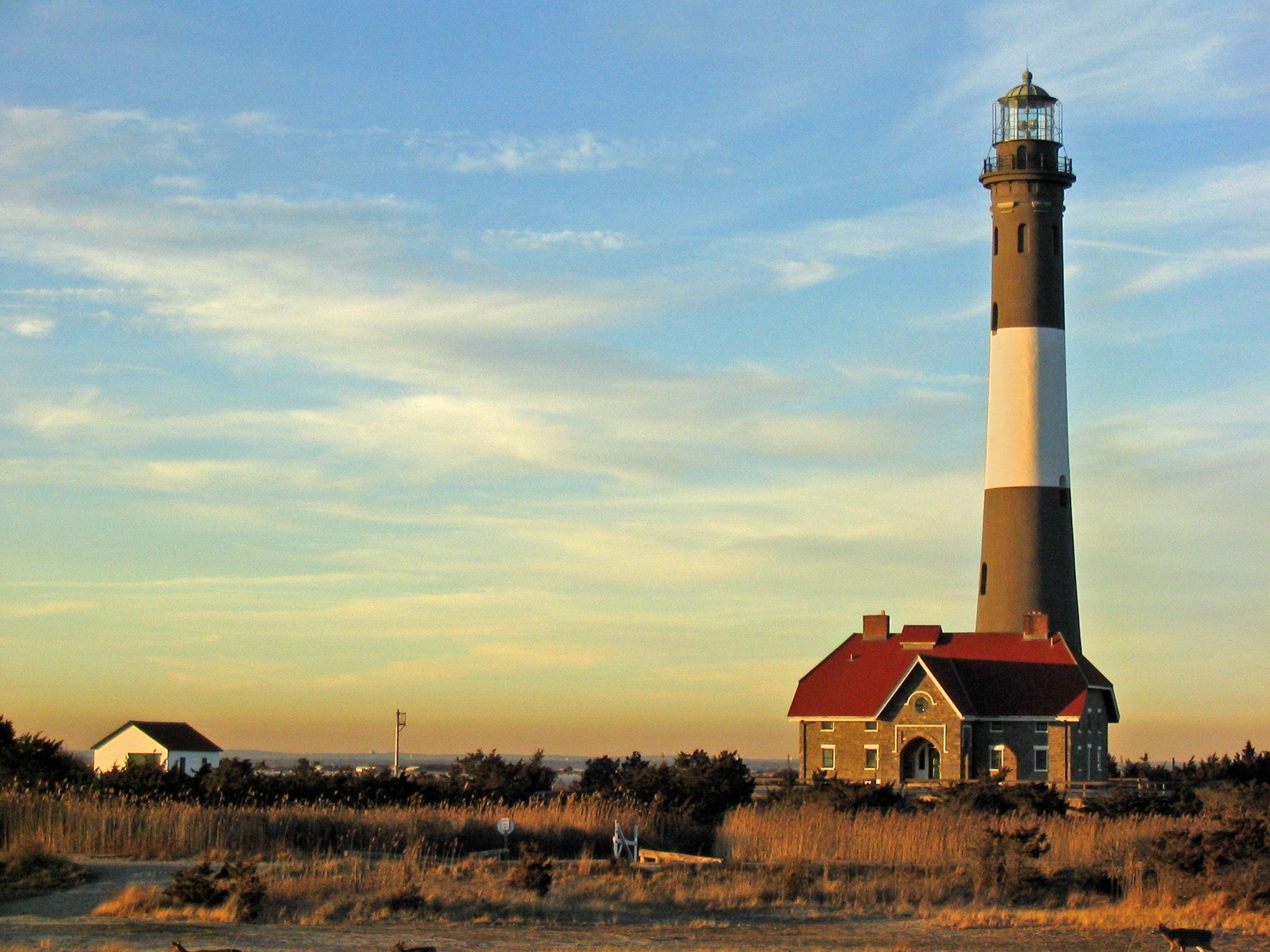
- Fire Island Lighthouse in December 2003
- Location: Fire Island inlet, Long Island
- Coordinates: 40°37′56.8″N 73°13′6.9″W

Tower
- Constructed: 1826
- Foundation: Connecticut River Blue Stone and timber
- Construction: Brick encased in cement
- Automated: 1986
- Height: 168 feet (51 m)
- Shape: Conical tower
- Markings: Four black and white bands
- Heritage: National Register of Historic Places listed place

Light
- First lit: 1858
- Deactivated: Active, inactive 1974–1986
- Focal height: 55 m (180 ft)
- Lens: First order Fresnel 1856 (original), Carlisle & Finch Company (current)
- Range: 24 nautical miles (44 km; 28 mi)
- Characteristic: Flashing White 7.5 seconds counterclockwise.
- Fire Island Light Station; Fire Island Light Station Historic District
- U.S. National Register of Historic Places
- U.S. Historic district
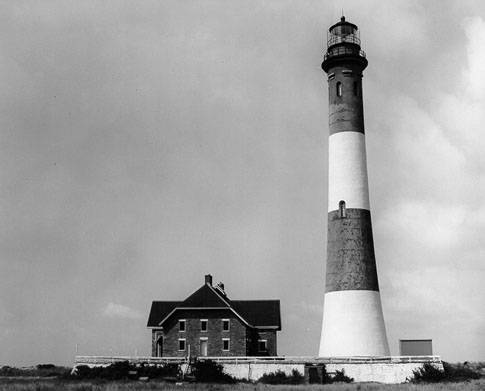
- Nearest city: Kismet, New York
- Area: 0.3 acres (0.12 ha)
- Built: 1858
- Architect: Morton, J.T.
- NRHP reference No.: 81000082 09001288
- Added to NRHP: September 11, 1981; January 29, 2010 (boundary increase)

The Fire Island Lighthouse is a visible landmark on the Great South Bay, in southern Suffolk County, New York, on the western end of Fire Island, a barrier island off the southern coast of Long Island. The lighthouse is located within Fire Island National Seashore and just to the east of Robert Moses State Park. It is part of the Fire Island Light Station which contains the light, keepers quarters, the lens building containing the original first-order Fresnel lens, and a boat house.

== History ==
The current lighthouse is a 168-foot (51 m) stone tower that began operation in 1858 to replace the 74-foot (23 m) tower originally built in 1826. The United States Coast Guard decommissioned the light in 1974. In 1982 the Fire Island Lighthouse Preservation Society (FILPS) was formed to preserve the lighthouse. FILPS raised over $1.2 million to restore the tower and light. On May 25, 1986, the United States Coast Guard returned the Fire Island Lighthouse to an active aid to navigation. On February 22, 2006, the light became a private aid to navigation. It continues to be on the nautical charts, but is operated and maintained by the Fire Island Lighthouse Preservation Society and not the USCG. It was added to the National Register of Historic Places in 1981 and a boundary increase for the national historic district occurred in 2010.

It is listed as Fire Island Light, number 695, in the USCG light lists.

When the lighthouse was built it was on the edge of Fire Island Inlet and marked the western end of Fire Island. However Fire Island has extended itself through accumulating sand so that the lighthouse is now nearly five miles (8.0 km) from the western end of the island at Democrat Point.

The Archives Center at the Smithsonian National Museum of American History has a collection (#1055) of souvenir postcards of lighthouses and has digitized 272 of these and made them available online. These include postcards of Fire Island Light with links to customized nautical charts provided by National Oceanographic and Atmospheric Administration.

The lighthouse celebrated its 150th anniversary in 2008, the same year as the 100th anniversary of Robert Moses State Park.

The lighthouse was damaged in a storm by a heavy wind event in March 2023. While no structural damage occurred a "exterior facade panel separated from the building" leading to the suspension of tower tours and the launch of restoration efforts. The tower was reopened for tours by August 30, 2023, after the stabilization of the outer façade was completed by the installation of a steel cable mesh system. Further restoration efforts have been delayed because of Trump administration cuts to the National Park Service.

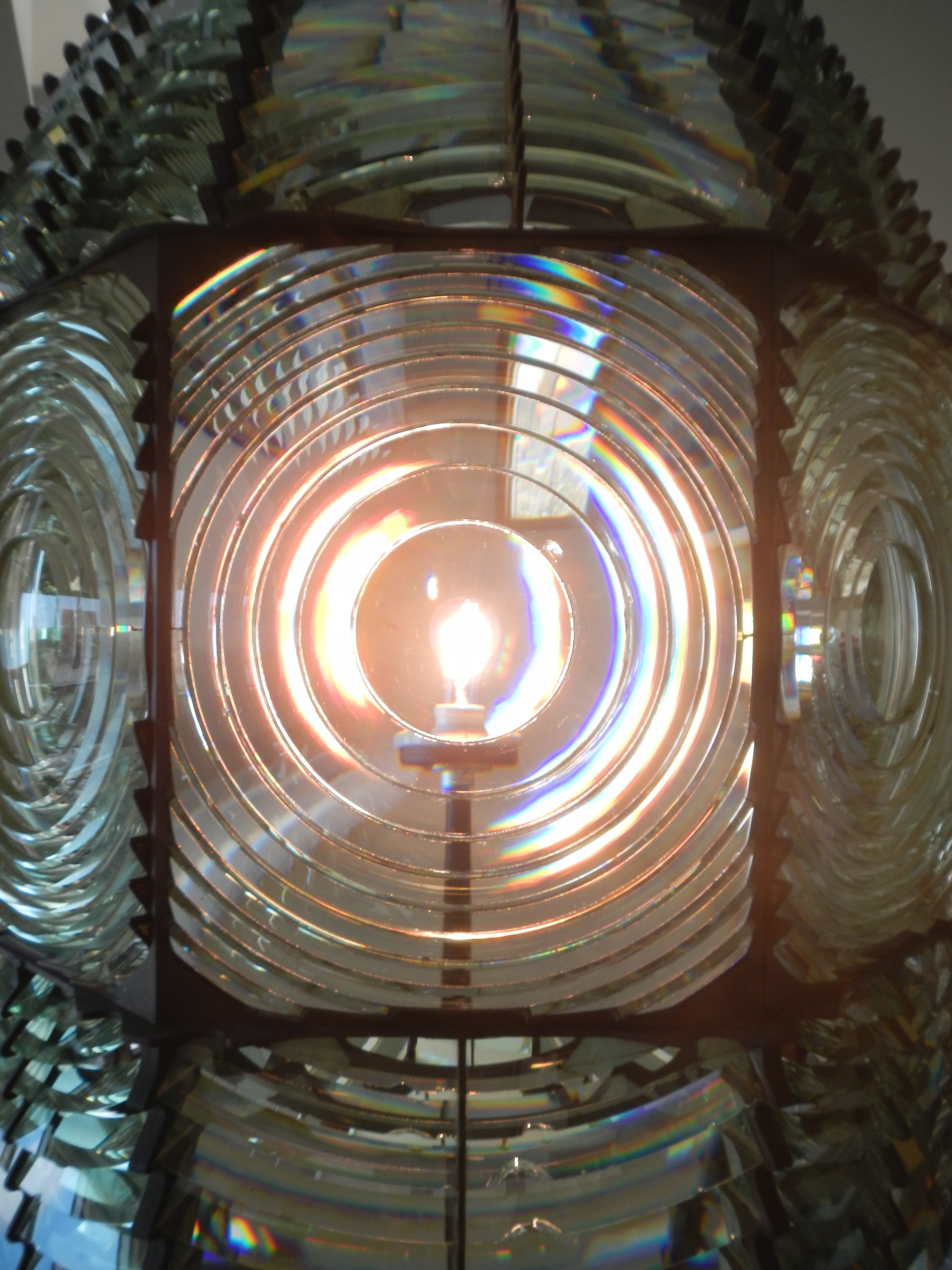
The original first order Fresnel lens.

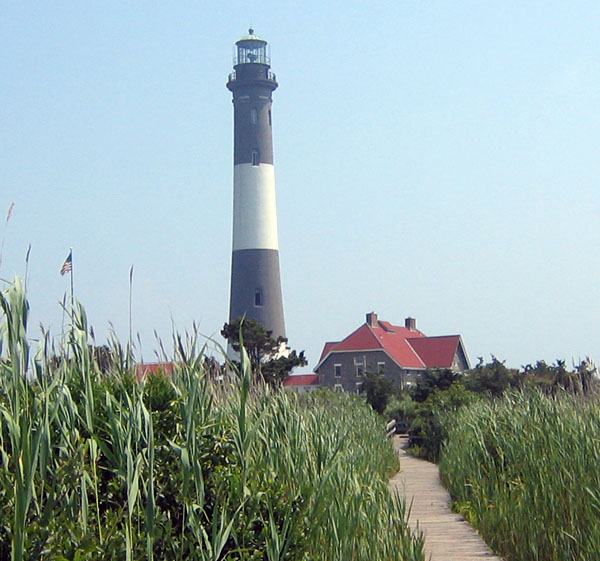
Fire Island Lighthouse.

== Access ==
The lighthouse can be accessed by a short walk from Robert Moses State Park Field 5. It is open to the public daily. Tower tours are available for a small fee.

== In popular culture ==
From 1970 to 1975, the lighthouse and its surrounding area were seen in the opening and closing credits sequences of the CBS television soap opera The Guiding Light.

Some of the final episode of season 1 of TV show The Following was filmed at Fire Island Lighthouse and surrounding buildings.

Men in Black II also included some filming on the island in the immediate vicinity of the lighthouse.

A 1999 Channel 4 TV series featuring Stephen Fry and called Fire Island included filming of the lighthouse.

The 2008 movie What Happens in Vegas with Cameron Diaz and Ashton Kutcher featured the lighthouse as Diaz character's favorite place.

== Rumors of paranormal activity ==
According to local legend the lighthouse is haunted. The most prominent legend is that the historic structure is haunted by the ghosts of a lighthouse keeper and his daughter. Legend has it that the lighthouse keeper's daughter got sick and died before her father could get help to arrive from the mainland. The grieving father then responded by taking his own life by hanging himself in the lighthouse's tower. Now the ghosts of father and daughter supposedly haunt the lighthouse to this day. Additionally, many also claim that the ghosts of carious people who died in shipwrecks both before and after the construction of the current lighthouse also haunt the lighthouse, including the ghost of author and women's activist Margaret Fuller. On January 7, 2022, a group of seven paranormal investigators were given permission by the Fire Island Lighthouse Preservation Society to investigate the lighthouse. They produced several pieces of video and photographic evidence of supposed paranormal activity that was later published by Fire Island & Great South Bay News on October 20, 2024.

== See also ==
- List of lighthouses in New York
