= Cedar Island Light =

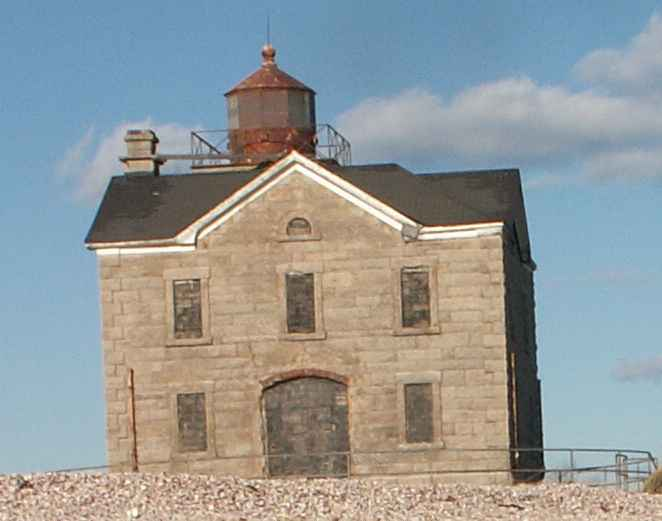
- Location: Cedar Point County Park, Sag Harbor, Gardiners Bay, Long Island
- Coordinates: 41°2′26.9″N 72°15′39.5″W

Tower
- Constructed: 1839
- Foundation: Masonry pier
- Construction: Granite
- Automated: 1934
- Height: 30 feet (9.1 m)
- Shape: Square unpainted granite
- Heritage: National Register of Historic Places listed place

Light
- First lit: 1839
- Deactivated: 1934
- Focal height: 57 feet (17 m)
- Lens: Sixth order Fresnel 1855
- Range: 5 nautical miles (9.3 km; 5.8 mi)
- Characteristic: Fl G 4s - Flashing Green 4 s
- Cedar Island Lighthouse
- U.S. National Register of Historic Places
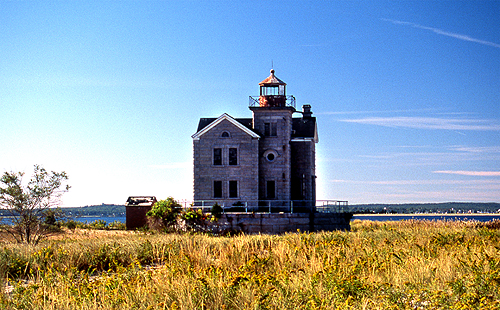
- Cedar Island Lighthouse at Cedar Point County Park
- Nearest city: Sag Harbor, New York
- Area: 1.5 acres (0.61 ha)
- Built: 1868
- Architectural style: Italianate
- NRHP reference No.: 03000248
- Added to NRHP: April 18, 2003

Cedar Island Light is a lighthouse in Cedar Point County Park in East Hampton, New York. It overlooks Gardiners Bay.

== History ==
The 40-foot (12 m) granite lighthouse was decommissioned in 1934 and replaced by an automatic light on a steel skeleton at breakwater. The lighthouse, built in the Italianate style, is listed on the National Register of Historic Places.

== Cultural ==
The Archives Center at the Smithsonian National Museum of American History has a collection (#1055) of souvenir postcards of lighthouses and has digitized 272 of these and made them available online. These include postcards of Cedar Island Light with links to customized nautical charts provided by National Oceanographic and Atmospheric Administration.
