= Point Aux Roches Light =

Lighthouse in New York, United States

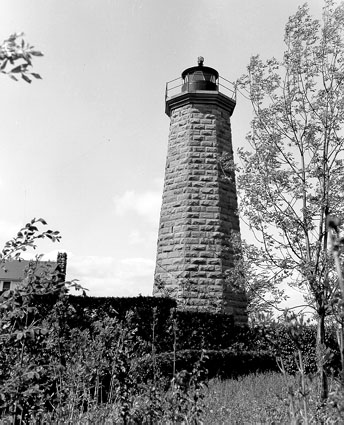
- Location: Lake Champlain, North of Plattsburgh, New York
- Coordinates: 44°47′58″N 73°21′38″W

Tower
- Foundation: Limestone Blocks
- Construction: Blue limestone block
- Height: 15 m (49 ft)
- Shape: Octagonal
- Markings: Natural

Light
- First lit: 1858
- Deactivated: 1989
- Focal height: 59 feet (18 m)
- Lens: Sixth Order Fresnel lens (original), 9.8 inches (250 mm) (current)

Point Aux Roches Light, sometimes referred to as Pointe Au Roches or Point Au Roches, is a lighthouse on Lake Champlain in New York. It is just north of Point Au Roches State Park.

The US Coast Guard sold the property in the 1930s. It is a private residence now.
