= Stuyvesant Light =

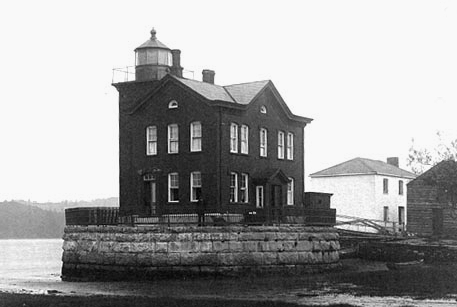
- Location: Stuyvesant, New York
- Coordinates: 42°24′42″N 73°46′42″W

Tower
- Constructed: 1829
- Foundation: Granite pier
- Construction: Square tower in sw angle of dwelling
- Height: 32 feet (9.8 m)
- Markings: Red
- Fog signal: none

Light
- First lit: 1868
- Deactivated: 1933
- Focal height: 42 feet (13 m)
- Lens: Sixth Order Fresnel lens
- Range: 11 nautical miles (20 km; 13 mi)
- Characteristic: Fixed Red

Stuyvesant Light was also known as Kinderhook Light.

In 1835, the lightkeeper was John Carroll, born in New York and paid $300 for the year.
