= Cedar Point County Park =

Park in East Hampton, New York, United States

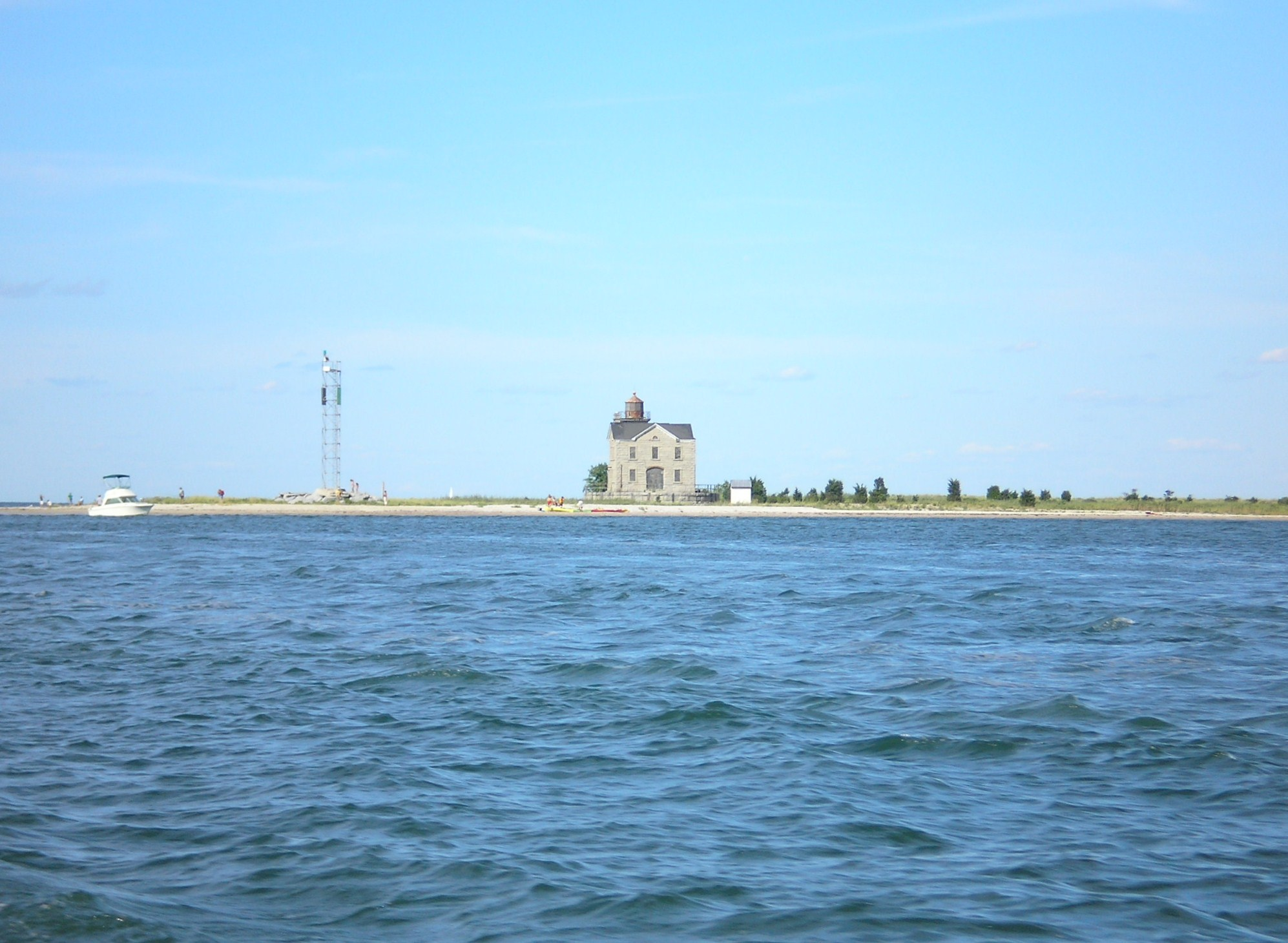
The Cedar Point Lighthouse at Cedar Point County Park

Cedar Point County Park is a 607-acre (246 ha) park in East Hampton, New York, owned by the government of Suffolk County, New York. It has commanding views of Gardiners Bay and is famed for its decommissioned lighthouse.

== History ==
Settled in 1651, Cedar Point was once a busy port for shipping farm goods, fish, and timber from Sag Harbor. The historic Cedar Point Lighthouse stood on an island 200 yards from shore when it was built in 1839. Its beacon served to guide whaling ships in and out of Sag Harbor during its hey-day as a major port. The 1938 New England hurricane transformed the shoreline, shifting sands to create a narrow, walkable strip that now connects the lighthouse with the mainland.

The 40 foot granite lighthouse which was built in 1868 was decommissioned in 1934 and replaced by an automatic light on a steel skeleton at breakwater. The lighthouse, built in the Italianate style, is listed on the National Register of Historic Places.

Virtually the entire park including the lighthouse was owned at one time by Phelan Beale, husband of Edith Ewing Bouvier Beale, whose dissolved marriage was the topic of movie, television and Broadway versions of Grey Gardens. It operated as a hunting club called the Grey Goose Gun Club of Cedar Point. and was acquired by Suffolk County in 1967. The lodge itself is now the park foreman's residence just north of the park's general store.

During the 1970s a small bush plane crash landed in the waters near the point. A father and son were killed instantly when their plane hit the water. The bodies were brought back to Coecles Harbor, Shelter Island and most of the plane parts were found and also brought back to Coecles.

In 1974 vandals burned the interior of the lighthouse.

The Long Island Chapter of the United States Lighthouse Society is currently working to restore the Cedar Island Lighthouse. They are seeking $2 million to convert it to a museum and bed and breakfast. Part of the plan includes restoring the lantern.
