= Crossover Island Light =

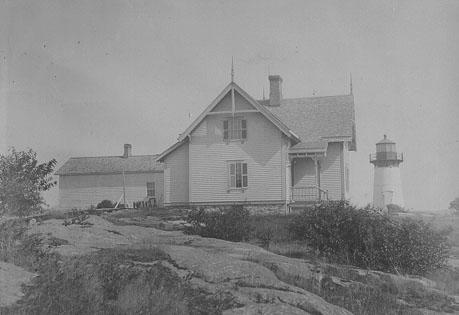
- Location: Crossover Island in the St. Lawrence River
- Coordinates: 44°29′49″N 75°46′42″W

Tower
- Constructed: 1848
- Foundation: Stone Molehead
- Construction: Cast iron brick & wood lining
- Shape: Conical
- Markings: White tower with Red Lantern
- Heritage: National Register of Historic Places listed place

Light
- First lit: 1882
- Deactivated: 1941
- Lens: Sixth Order Fresnel lens
- Crossover Island Light Station
- U.S. National Register of Historic Places
- Nearest city: St. Lawrence, New York
- Area: 1.5 acres (0.61 ha)
- MPS: U.S. U.S. Coast Guard Lighthouses and Light Stations on the Great Lakes TR
- NRHP reference No.: 07001037
- Added to NRHP: October 3, 2007

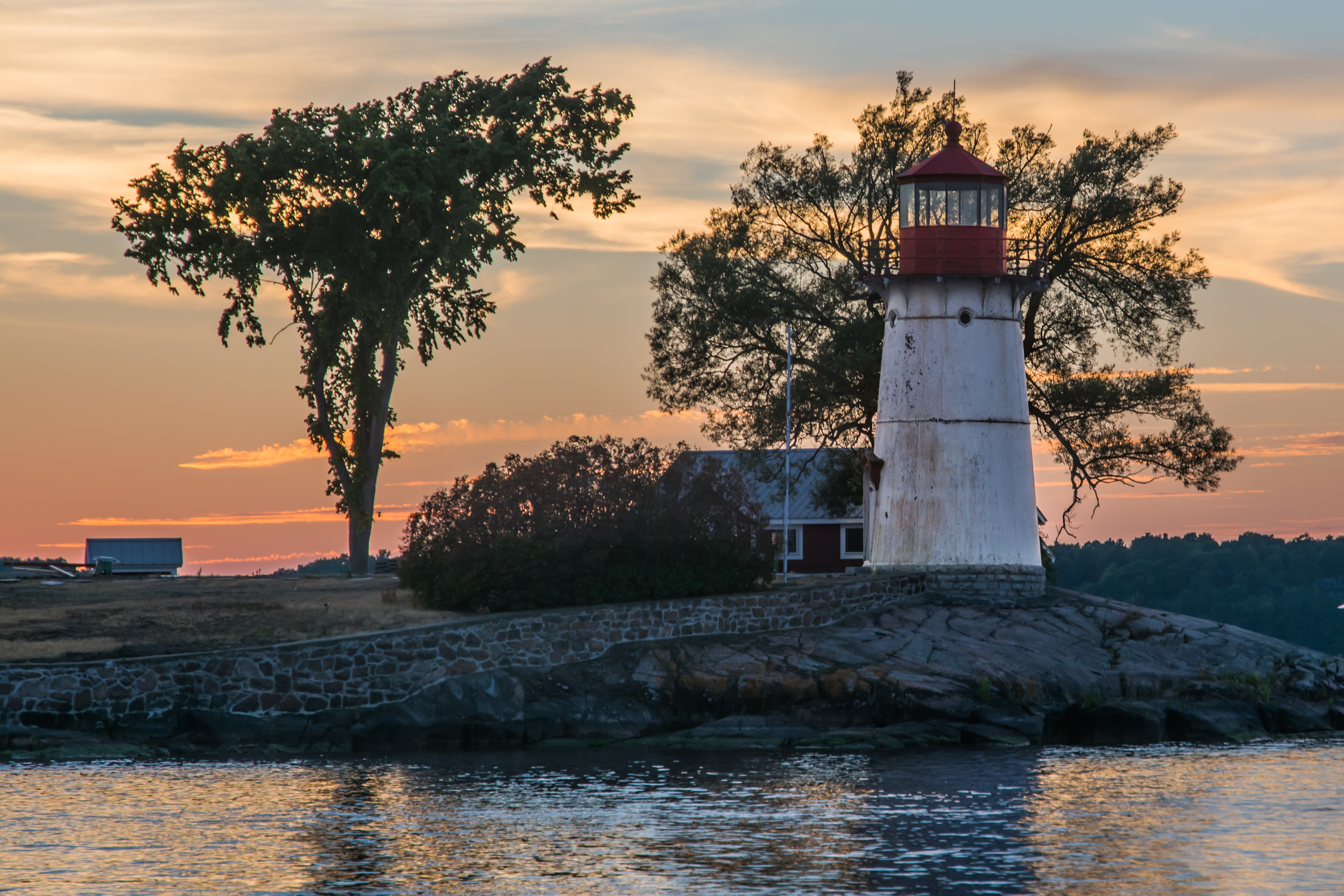
Crossover Island Light

Crossover Island Light is a lighthouse on the Saint Lawrence River in New York state near the Canada–United States border.

The lighthouse was established in 1848 and the last tower was first lit in 1882. The lighthouse was deactivated in 1941. The foundation is stone molehead and the lighthouse is made out of cast iron with brick and wood lining. The tower is a white conical tower with a red lantern. The original lens was a sixth-order Fresnel lens.

The lighthouse was added to the National Register of Historic Places as Crossover Island Light Station in 2007.
