= American Narrows =

Channel of the St. Lawrence River in Jefferson County, New York

- Interactive map of American Narrows
- Location: Jefferson County, New York, US
- Coordinates: 44°20′00″N 75°55′51″W
- Type: Channel
- Part of: St. Lawrence River
- Basin countries: United States
- Surface elevation: 74 metres (243 ft)

The American Narrows is a channel in Jefferson County, New York. It refers to a very narrow but deep section of the St. Lawrence River near Alexandria Bay, New York. With its strong currents and jagged rocks it has been the cause of demise for more than one vessel. It was the site of the NEPCO 140 Oil Spill in 1976.

== See also ==
- A.E. Vickery
- Thousand Islands
- Boldt Castle
- Alexandria Bay, New York
