= Sunken Rock Light =

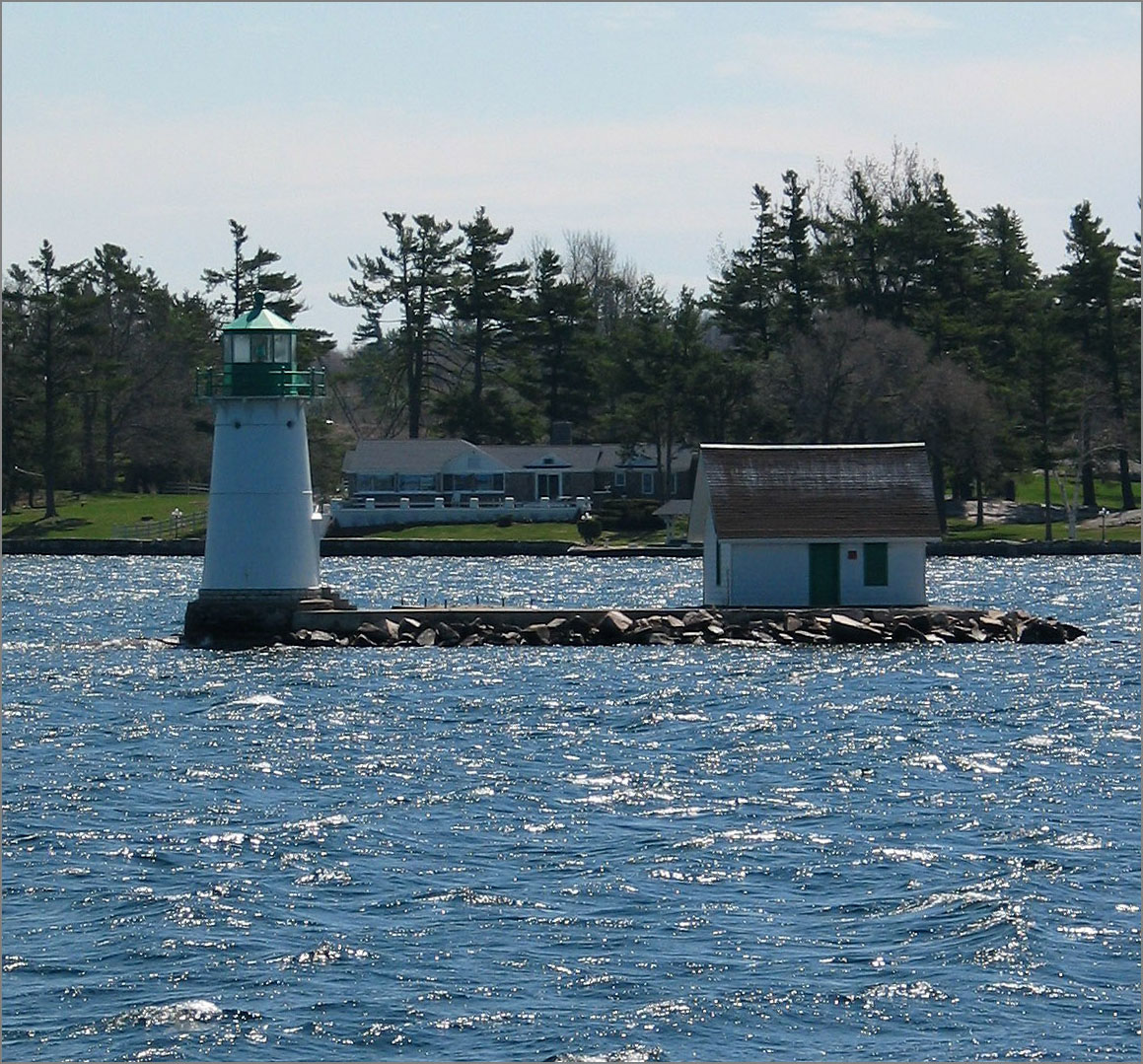
- Location: Bush Island, St. Lawrence River, New York
- Coordinates: 44°20′44″N 75°54′55″W

Tower
- Constructed: 1847
- Foundation: Stone on reef
- Construction: Cast iron
- Height: 9 m (30 ft)
- Shape: Conical
- Markings: White with green lantern

Light
- First lit: 1994
- Focal height: 9 m (30 ft)
- Lens: Sixth-order Fresnel lens
- Characteristic: Fl G 4s (flashing green 4 s)

Sunken Rock Light is a lighthouse in Bush Island, New York. It was converted to solar power in 1988. It is maintained by the Great Lakes St. Lawrence Seaway Development Corporation pursuant to an agreement with the U.S. Coast Guard authorized under 14 USC 81.
