= Barber's Point Light (New York) =

- Location: Barber's Point, southeast of Westport, New York on Lake Champlain
- Coordinates: 44.1543°N 73.4045°W

Tower
- Constructed: 1873
- Foundation: limestone
- Construction: limestone masonry
- Height: 36 feet (11 m)
- Shape: square house with integral tower
- Markings: White tower w/Black trim on dwelling

Light
- First lit: 1873
- Deactivated: 1935
- Lens: Fifth order Fresnel lens
- Range: 12 nautical miles; 23 kilometres (14 mi)
- Characteristic: fixed white

Barber's Point Light is an inactive lighthouse on Lake Champlain in New York.

== History ==
Barber's Point was the site of a ferry operated by Hezekiah Barber, who settled the point beginning in 1785. The Lighthouse Board requested construction of a light in 1868, but construction did not begin until 1872 due to problems acquiring title to the land. The Second Empire design used for the Colchester Reef Light (as well as others in the area) was reused, but executed in blue limestone rather than the more usual granite. Because of the light's isolation the keeper was provided with a barn in which to keep a horse.

In 1935 the light was deactivated, replaced by a much taller steel tower with an automated beacon, placed at lake's edge. The old lighthouse passed into private hands and is used for a residence. A small addition in the mid-1950s left the appearance of the building largely intact, though the roof is now painted white rather than brown.

The lighthouse is on the National Register of Historic Places as part of the Camp Dudley Road Historic District.
