= Tibbetts Point Light =

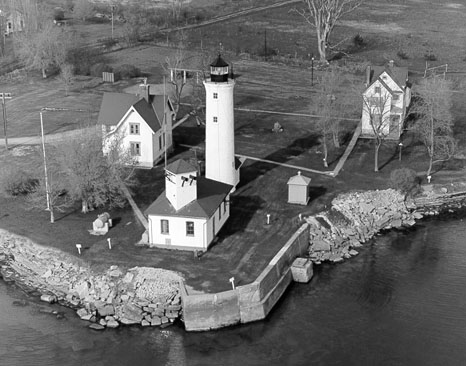
- Location: Tibbetts Point on Lake Ontario at the St Lawrence River
- Coordinates: 44°6′00″N 76°22′12″W

Tower
- Foundation: Natural/Emplaced
- Construction: Brick/Stucco
- Automated: 1981
- Height: 58 feet (18 m)
- Shape: Conical frustum
- Markings: White w/ Black Lantern
- Heritage: National Register of Historic Places listed place

Light
- First lit: 1854
- Focal height: 69 feet (21 m)
- Lens: Fourth Order Fresnel lens
- Range: 16 nautical miles (30 km; 18 mi)
- Characteristic: Occulting White (Oc W 10s)
- Tibbetts Point Light
- U.S. National Register of Historic Places
- Location: Cape Vincent, New York
- Area: 5 acres (2.0 ha)
- Built: 1854
- MPS: U.S. Coast Guard Lighthouses and Light Stations on the Great Lakes TR
- NRHP reference No.: 84002412
- Added to NRHP: July 19, 1984

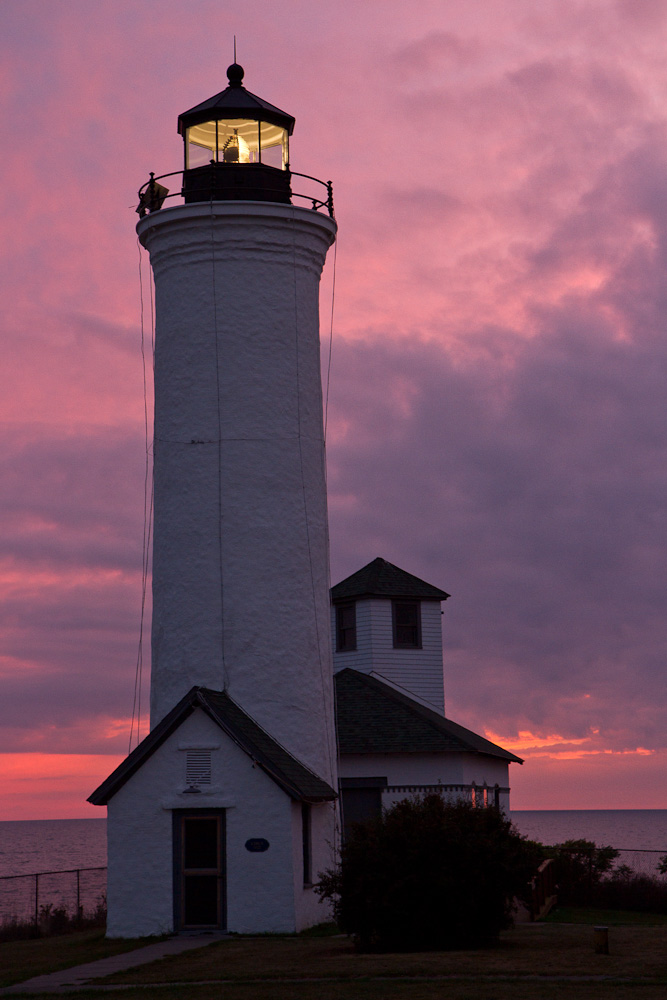
Tibbetts Point Lighthouse

The Tibbetts Point Lighthouse is located in Cape Vincent, New York. The land upon which the lighthouse stands is a part of a 600-acre (243 ha) grant of land to Captain John Tibbetts of Troy, New York. The lighthouse is a circular tower that stands 69 feet (21 m) above the water

The lighthouse was constructed in 1854. Its Fresnel lens is still used. Only 70 such lenses are still operational in the United States, 16 being on the Great Lakes, of which two are in New York.

Tibbetts Point Light is on the Great Lakes Seaway Trail. It is listed on the National Register of Historic Places.

== Cultural ==
The Archives Center at the Smithsonian National Museum of American History has a collection (#1055) of souvenir postcards of lighthouses and has digitized 272 of these and made them available online. These include postcards of Tibbetts Point Light with links to customized nautical charts provided by the National Oceanographic and Atmospheric Administration.
