= Great Lakes Seaway Trail =

Scenic route in New York and Pennsylvania, US

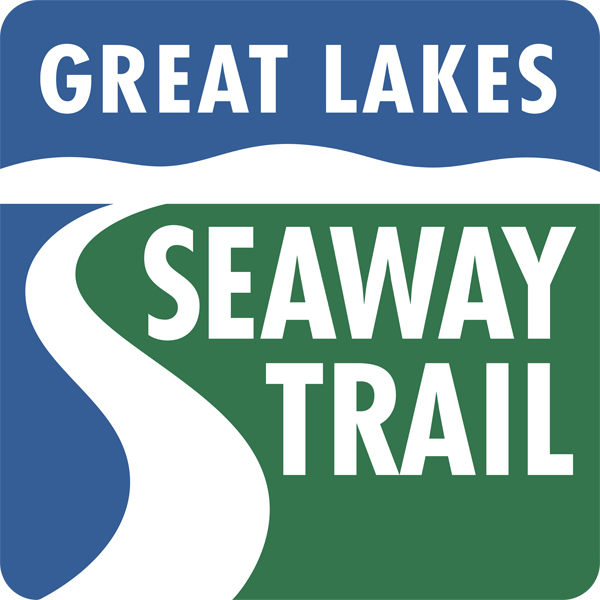
Seaway Trail

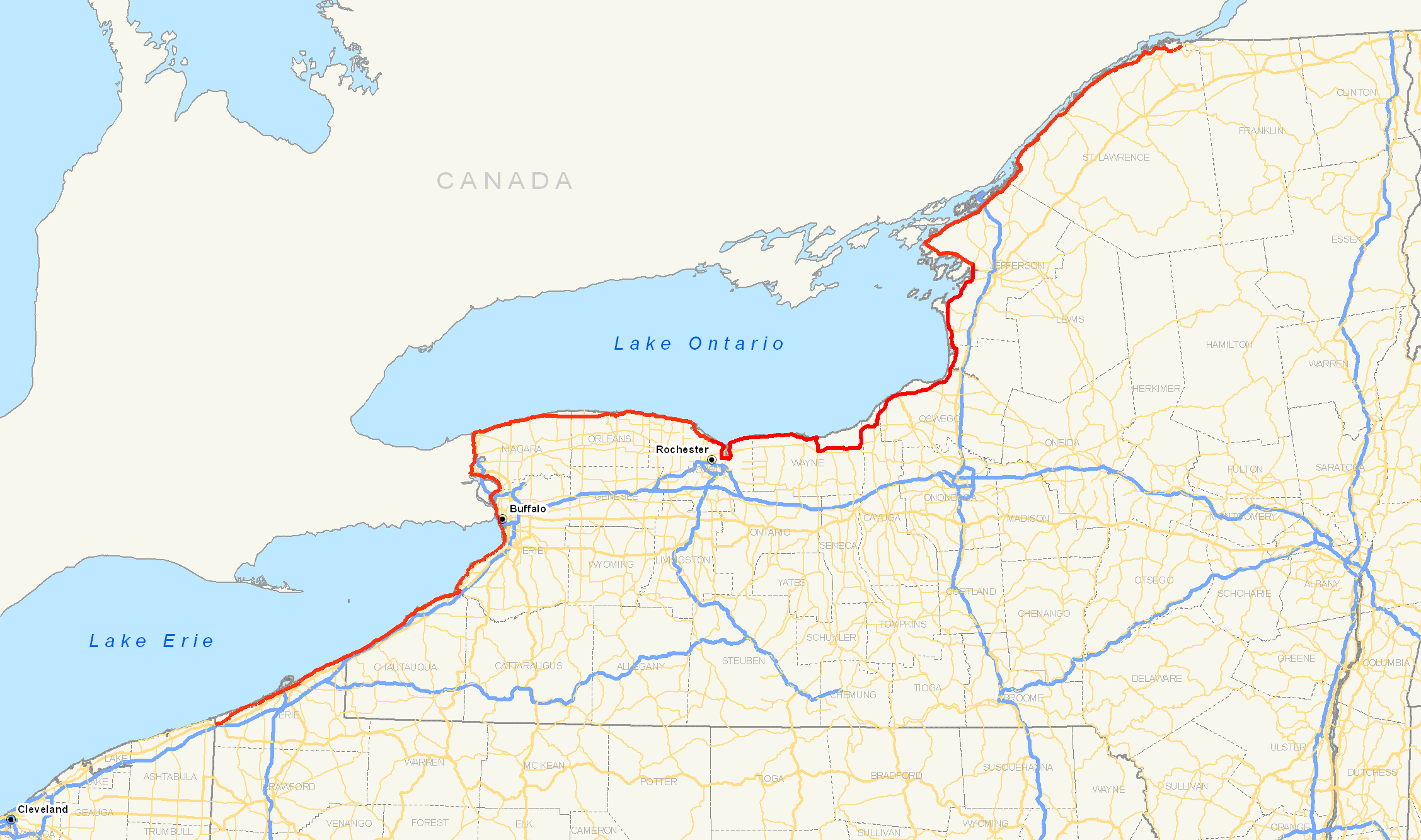

Route information
- Length: 518 mi (834 km)
- Existed: 1978–present

Major junctions
- West end: Ohio–Pennsylvania state line west of Erie, PA
- East end: US–Canada border at Seaway International Bridge near Massena, NY

Location
- Country: United States

Highway system
- Scenic Byways; National; National Forest; BLM; NPS

The Great Lakes Seaway Trail, formerly named and commonly known as the Seaway Trail, is a 518-mile (834 km) National Scenic Byway in the northeastern United States, mostly contained in New York but with a small segment in Pennsylvania. The trail consists of a series of designated roads and highways that travel along the Saint Lawrence Seaway—specifically, Lake Erie, the Niagara River, Lake Ontario, and the Saint Lawrence River. It begins at the Ohio state line in rural Erie County, Pennsylvania, and travels through several cities and villages (including the cities of Buffalo, Niagara Falls, Rochester, Oswego, and Ogdensburg) before ending at the Seaway International Bridge northeast of the village of Massena in St. Lawrence County, New York. It is maintained by the non-profit Seaway Trail, Inc.

The Seaway Trail was first designated in 1978 as an 80-mile (129 km) byway leading from the Seaway International Bridge to the Thousand Islands Bridge. It was extended southwestward across the state of New York in the mid-1980s and into Pennsylvania in 1996. The byway is recognized as a state scenic byway by both New York and Pennsylvania (the latter designation coming in 2003) and was named a National Scenic Byway in two stages. In New York, the Seaway Trail became one of the first byways in the nation to be declared a National Scenic Byway when it received the distinction in 1996. The Pennsylvania portion of the byway was added in 2005. The Seaway Trail was officially renamed the Great Lakes Seaway Trail in 2010.

== Route description ==
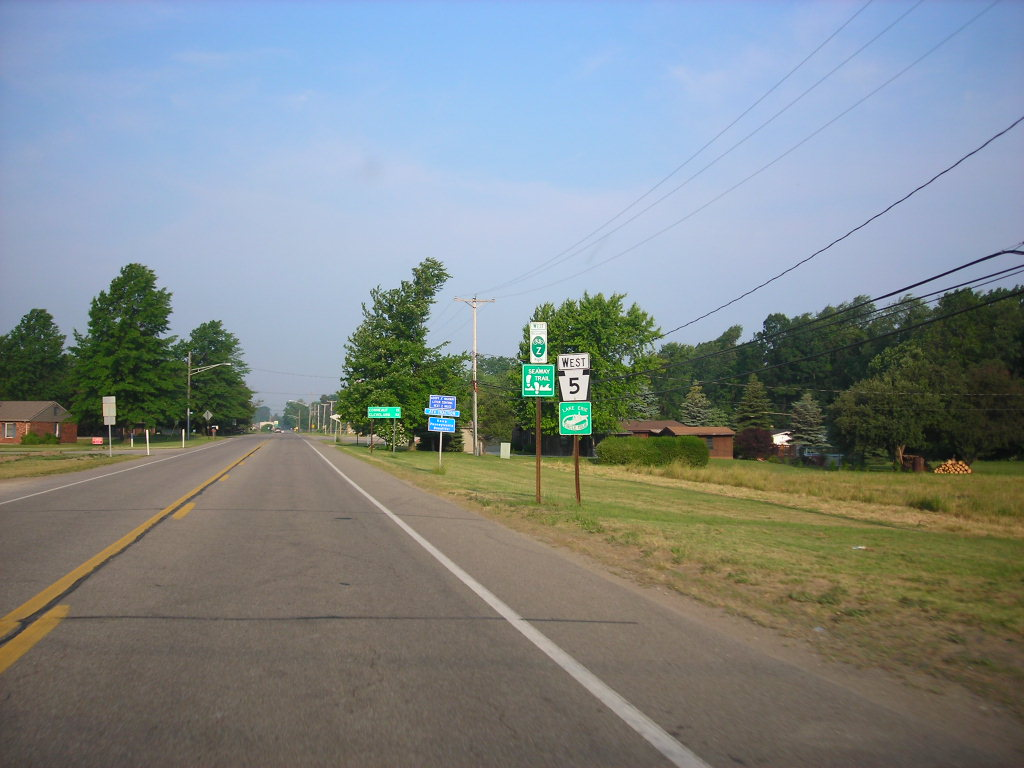
Reassurance markers for the Seaway Trail and the Lake Erie Circle Tour on PA 5 westbound

The interstate Seaway Trail extends for 64 miles (103 km) in Pennsylvania and 454 miles (731 km) in New York for a total of 518 miles (834 km). It traverses a total of 11 counties as it crosses the two states; however, all but one—Erie County, Pennsylvania—is located in New York. There, the Seaway Trail traverses the counties of Chautauqua, Erie, Niagara, Orleans, Monroe, Wayne, Cayuga, Oswego, Jefferson, and St. Lawrence.

=== Pennsylvania ===
The Seaway Trail begins, at its southwestern end, on U.S. Route 20 (US 20) at the Ohio–Pennsylvania border, but stays on that route for only 1.5 miles (2.4 km), when it switches to Pennsylvania Route 5 (PA 5). Aside from some complicated routing in and around the city of Erie, the trail remains on Route 5 the rest of the way to the New York border.

Attractions along this segment of the Seaway Trail include the city of Erie itself, Presque Isle State Park, Erie Bluffs State Park, Waldameer & Water World, the Erie Maritime Museum, and the North East winery region.

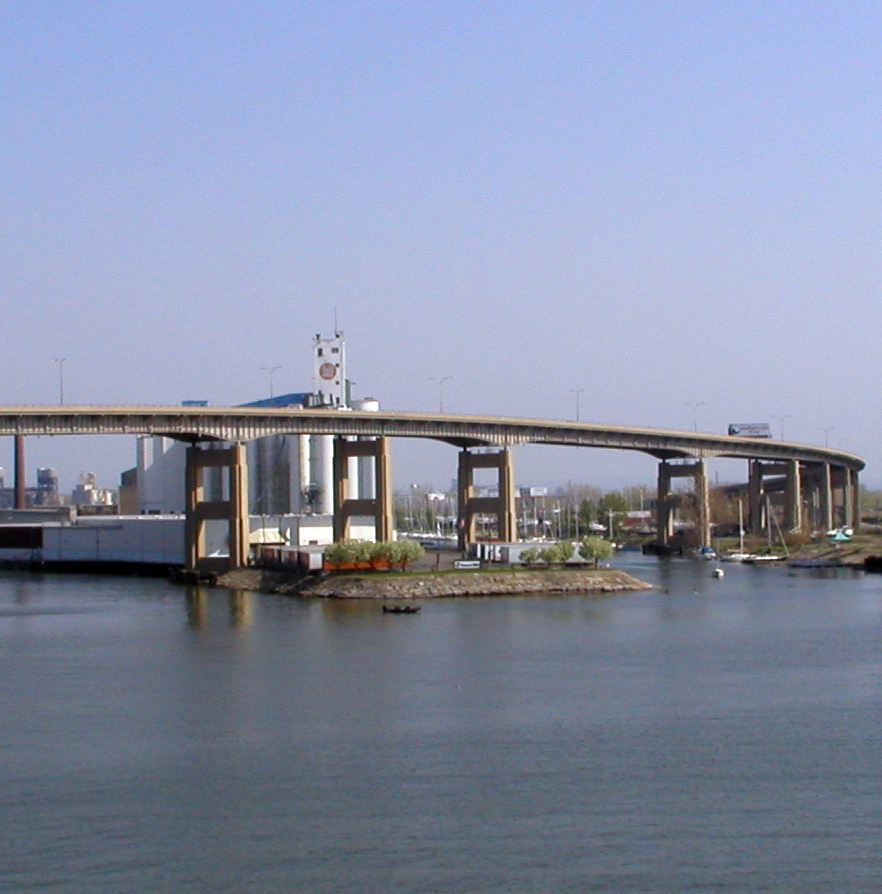
The Skyway carries NY 5 and the trail into downtown Buffalo.

=== New York ===
==== Chautauqua and Erie Counties ====
At the New York border, PA 5 becomes New York State Route 5 (NY 5), and the Seaway Trail continues along it to the Erie County border. Route 5 and the Seaway Trail cross Cattaraugus Creek together at the county line, but the trail quickly turns off to the west and then back north again along Old Lake Shore Road, to more closely follow the shore of Lake Erie. The Seaway Trail rejoins Route 5 in Hamburg, and they continue north into the city of Buffalo, the largest city on the Seaway Trail.

In Buffalo, the Seaway Trail leaves Route 5 for good as it heads north through downtown. It soon picks up NY 266 and follows it to the tip of Lake Erie. Now paralleling the Niagara River, going north, the trail follows Route 266 through the town of Tonawanda and into the city of Tonawanda, a Buffalo suburb. Just before crossing Tonawanda Creek, which forms the county line, Route 266 ends and the Seaway Trail picks up NY 265 to cross the creek and the border.

Points of interest along the Chautauqua County piece of the trail include the Barcelona Lighthouse in Westfield, Lake Erie State Park, and the city of Dunkirk. Nearby is the Chautauqua Institution, the Midway Park amusement park, and the city of Jamestown. In Erie County, aside from the many attractions in the city of Buffalo, nearby destinations include Highmark Stadium in Orchard Park and a series of three museums in East Aurora. Hamburg features a visitors center and overlook, the Lake Erie Seaway Trail Center, on the Lake Erie shoreline. The Erie Canal starts at Tonawanda Creek just east of the Route 265 crossing.

==== Niagara County ====
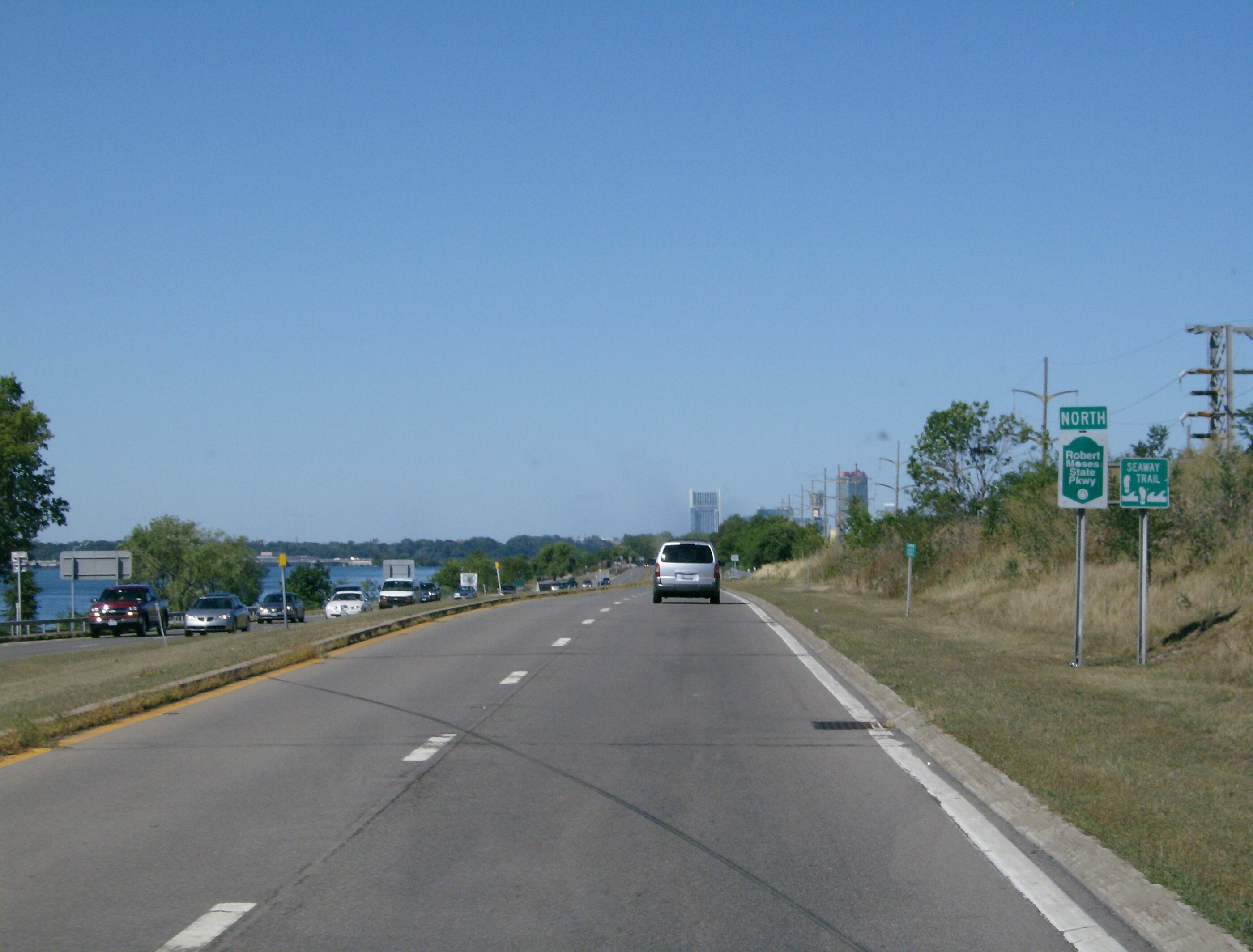
Following the Niagara River on the Robert Moses Parkway, with Niagara Falls in the background

Crossing Tonawanda Creek into North Tonawanda, the Seaway Trail continues along Route 265, which soon overlaps with NY 384. Both routes run along River Road very close to the eastern fork of the Niagara River (around Grand Island). The road curves to the west toward Niagara Falls. River Road becomes Buffalo Avenue when it enters the city of Niagara Falls, and soon Route 265 splits off to the north. Route 384 continues westward, where the Seaway Trail picks up the Robert Moses State Parkway at its eastern terminus at the northern Grand Island bridge, which carries Interstate 190 (I-190).

The Robert Moses Parkway follows extremely close to the river to Quay Street; continuing west would take drivers directly into Niagara Falls State Park, but the Seaway Trail instead uses Quay Street to access Rainbow Boulevard, which was once part of NY 384. Rainbow Boulevard turns north and ends at NY 104 (Main Street) just east of the Rainbow Bridge to Niagara Falls, Ontario, Canada.

The Seaway Trail continues north on Route 104 to NY 18F in the village of Lewiston. Route 18F jogs west and north through Lewiston and then north to Youngstown. North of Youngstown, Route 18F comes very close to the mouth of the Niagara River and swings eastward, now following the Lake Ontario shoreline. Route 18F ends a short distance east of the river's mouth at NY 18. Route 18 hosts the Seaway Trail for the rest of its length in Niagara County, which is almost 30 miles (48 km).

Aside from the Falls themselves, and the twin cities of Niagara Falls on either side of the border, nearby attractions include Artpark in Lewiston, the Erie Canal Junction at Tonawanda Creek, the Herschell Carrousel Factory Museum in North Tonawanda, Fort Niagara in Youngstown, and Golden Hill State Park in Somerset. There are also several historic lighthouses along the route. Not far away, Erie Canal tours are offered out of the city of Lockport.

==== Orleans County ====
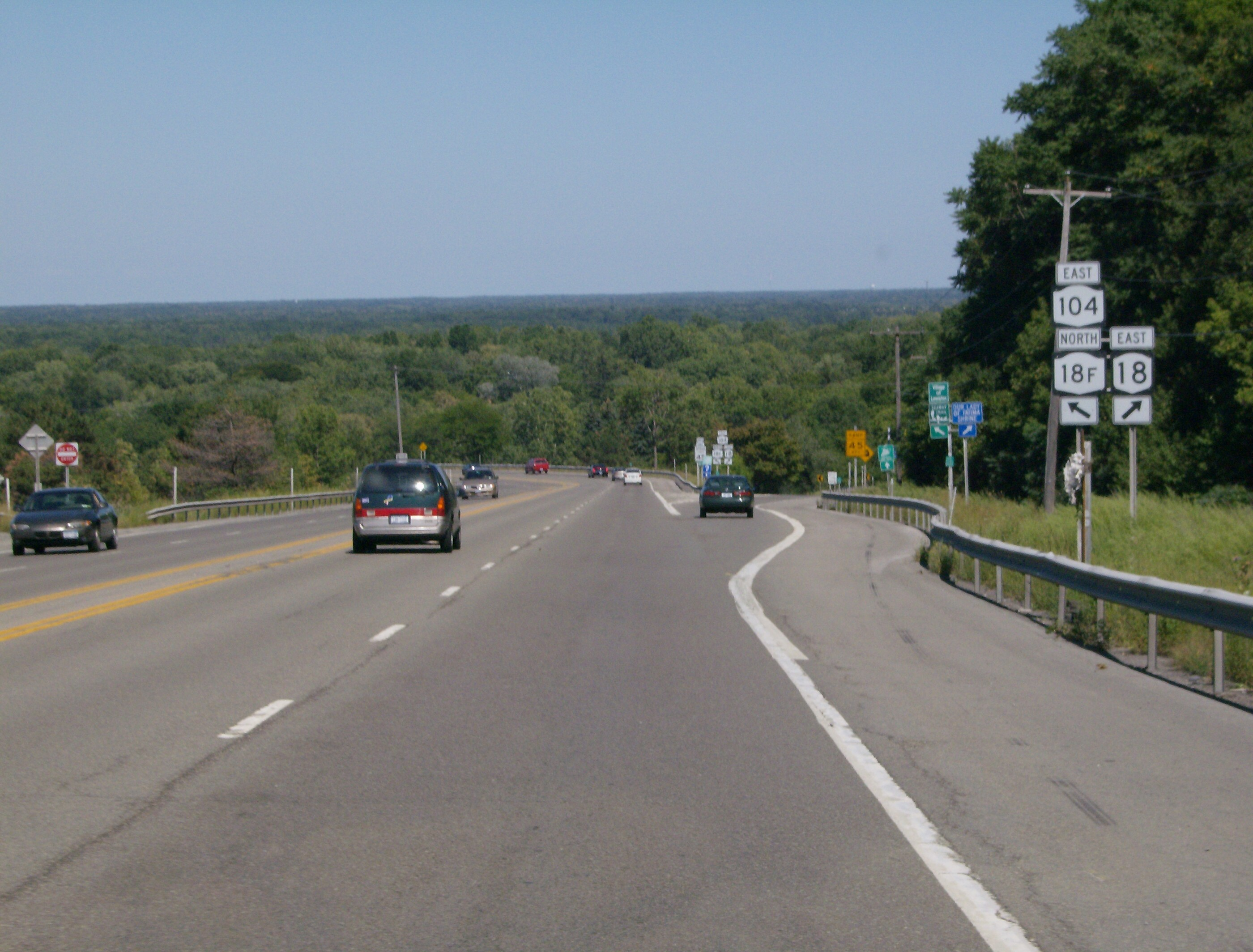
Descending the Niagara Escarpment on NY 104 and the Seaway Trail, marked on the second assembly

The Seaway Trail follows Route 18 eastward about halfway through Orleans County, where it switches onto the Lake Ontario State Parkway at its western terminus. The Parkway continues east, coming very close to the Lake Ontario shore at times, until crossing the border into Monroe County.

Orleans County is largely rural; attractions include the Cobblestone Society Museum complex in Childs, the Historic Courthouse Square in the county seat of Albion, Point Breeze, and two state parks: Lakeside Beach State Park and the Oak Orchard State Marine Park. Some distance to the south, straddling the Genesee County border, is the Iroquois National Wildlife Refuge.

==== Monroe County ====
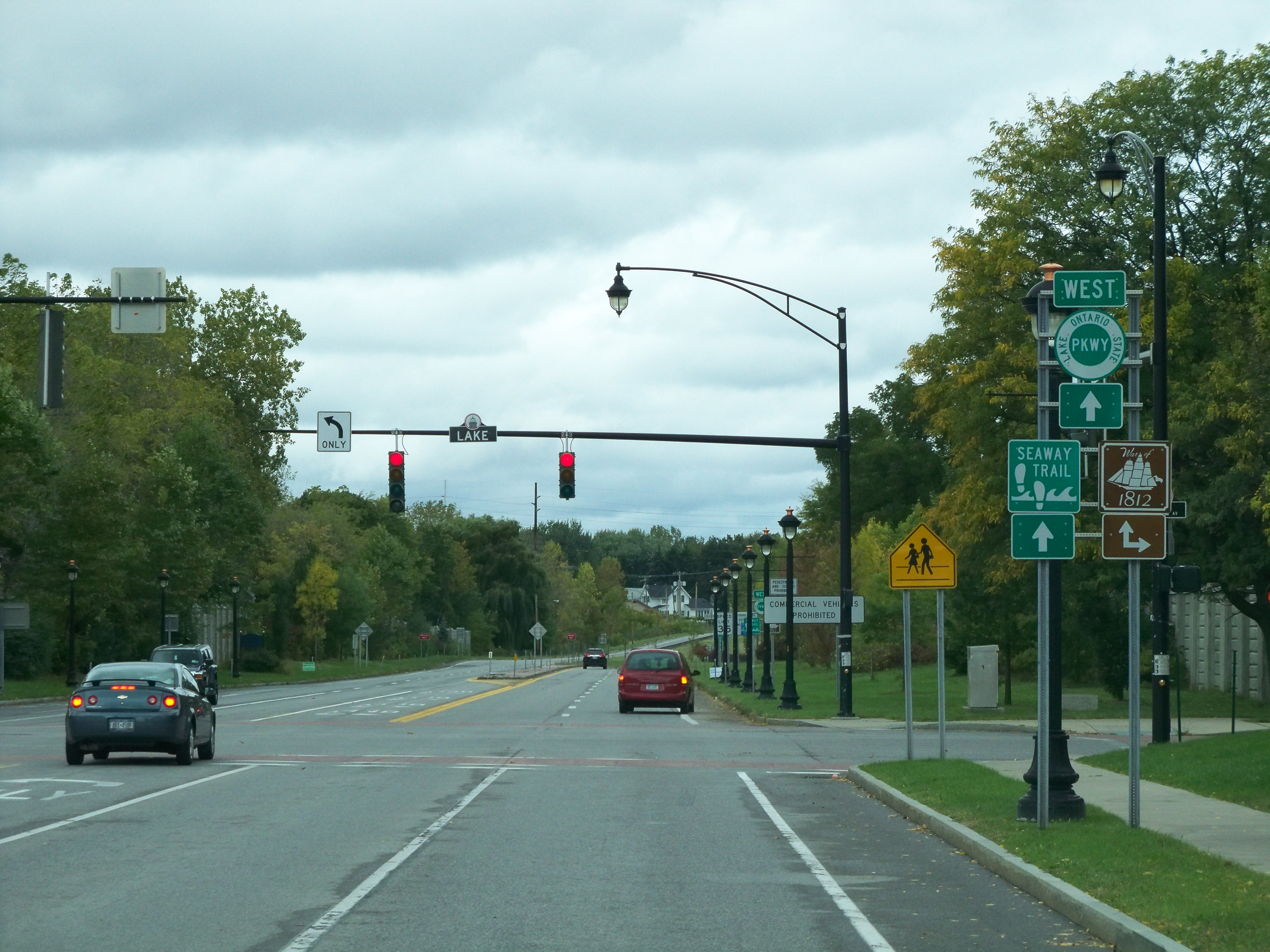
Seaway Trail and War of 1812 reassurance markers at the east end of the Lake Ontario Parkway in Charlotte

The Seaway Trail continues along the Lake Ontario State Parkway to its eastern terminus just inside the city of Rochester. The trail crosses Lake Avenue and onto the Colonel Patrick O'Rorke Bridge over the Genesee River. Now on Pattonwood Drive, the trail almost immediately exits this narrow strip of the city and enters the town of Irondequoit.

The Seaway Trail meanders along Lake Shore Boulevard through northern Irondequoit and the city-owned Durand–Eastman Park and Sweet Fern Drive to Culver Road. The trail takes Culver Road south, away from Lake Ontario, in order to go around Irondequoit Bay. At Empire Boulevard, the trail starts eastward again. NY 404 begins a short distance along Empire Boulevard, and the trail follows them east and north-northeast along the shore of the bay. The trail next follows Bay Road, staying close to the bay shore, north-northwest to its terminus at Lake Road, just one-tenth of a mile (0.16 km) from Lake Ontario.

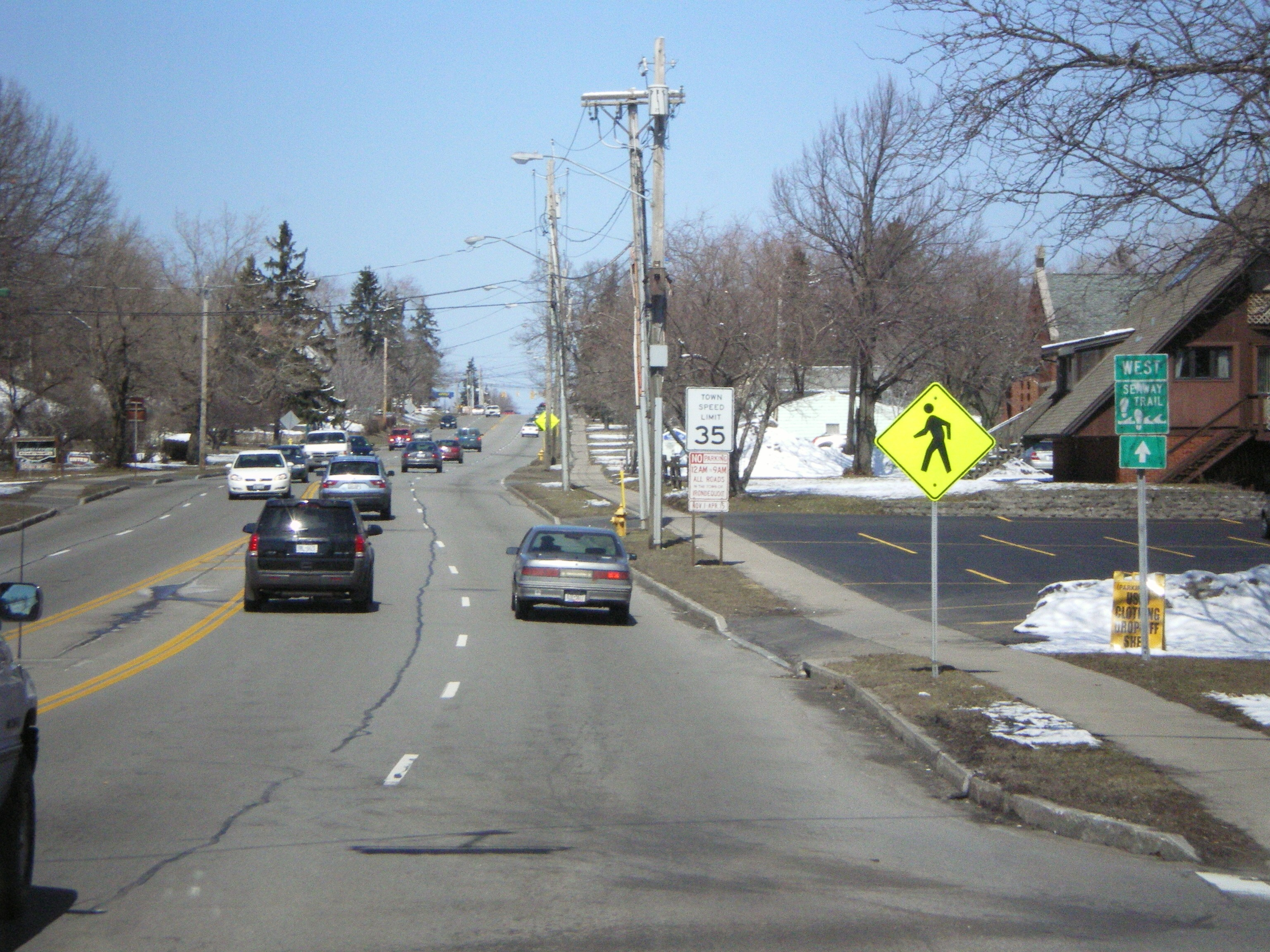
Northbound on Culver Road in Irondequoit

Alternately, during the winter months, Seaway Trail travelers can take Culver Road approximately 1-mile (1.6 km) north toward the lake shore, cross the seasonal Irondequoit Bay Outlet Bridge to Lake Road and rejoin the normal Seaway Trail in approximately 1-mile (1.6 km) at the intersection of Bay Road. The route avoids the longer trip (11.8 miles or 19.0 kilometres) around the bay to the south and takes in additional scenic landmarks such as Seabreeze Amusement Park and the jetties at the outlet.

In either case, Lake Road carries the Seaway Trail eastward along the northern edge of the town of Webster to the county line.

The Seaway Trail travels through only a small sliver of the city of Rochester, but the bulk of the city is not far to the south and contains numerous attractions. Aside from those, attractions near the trail route include Hamlin Beach State Park, more lighthouses, and Seabreeze Amusement Park. Not far away, south of Rochester, are the Genesee Country Village and Museum, the New York Museum of Transportation, and Mendon Ponds Park.

==== Wayne, Cayuga and Oswego Counties ====
From County Line Road, Seaway Trail continues along Lake Road passing the Ginna Nuclear Generating Station (3.4 miles) and on to Sodus Point, on the shores of Sodus Bay. There, the trail takes NY 14 south to Ridge Road. "The Ridge" heads east through the village of Wolcott to its eastern terminus at NY 370. Route 370 takes the trail north less than one mile (1.6 km) to its northern terminus at NY 104. NY 104A begins here and picks up the Seaway Trail designation. Route 104A takes the trail north toward the lake shore, through the village of Red Creek, but turns northeast and hits the county line still some distance from the lake.

The Seaway Trail enters Cayuga County heading northeast along Route 104A and soon enters the village of Fair Haven, on the southern shore of Little Sodus Bay. Route 104A turns east toward the hamlet of Sterling, then north again before again moving northeast, paralleling the Lake Ontario shore at a distance of about two miles (3.2 km). Just a mile later, Route 104A hits the county line. Continuing northeast, Route 104A terminates at its parent route, NY 104, which previously carried the Seaway Trail in Niagara Falls and here does so again. Route 104 continues Route 104A's northeastern path, gradually getting closer to the lake shore, until it enters the city of Oswego. Crossing the Oswego River, Route 104 continues eastward.

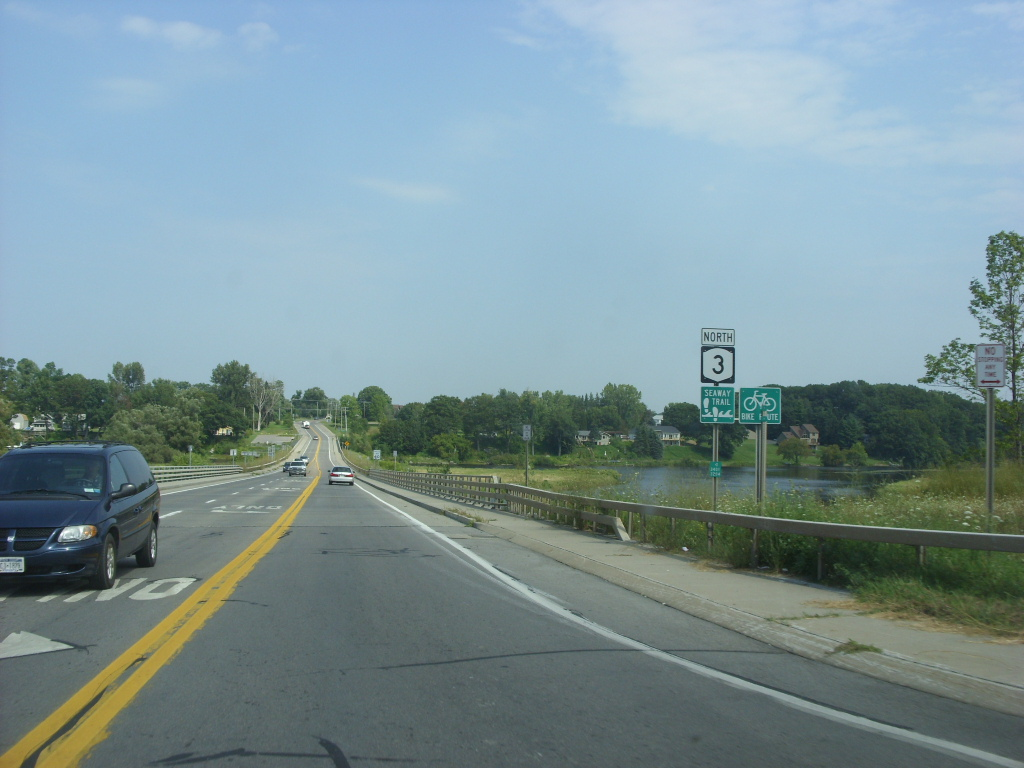
Crossing over the Salmon River on NY 3 and the Seaway Trail

Just before the hamlet of New Haven, the Seaway Trail veers northeast onto NY 104B at its western terminus. Route 104B approaches the lake shore again as it heads toward the hamlet of Texas. The route ends at NY 3 east of Texas. The Seaway Trail follows Route 3 northeast, then north, crossing the Salmon River at Port Ontario. Route 3 continues north across the county line.

Wayne County is largely rural. Attractions here include the Sodus Point lighthouse, boating on Sodus Bay, and Chimney Bluffs State Park. A bit farther south is the town of Palmyra, where the Latter Day Saint movement (Mormonism) began in 1830. To the direct east, Cayuga County is relatively thin near Lake Ontario, so the Seaway Trail doesn't take long to pass through it. Fair Haven Beach State Park is nearby, and in July and August, travelers can visit the Sterling Renaissance Festival. The city of Oswego in Oswego County contains several attractions, including Fort Ontario. There is a lighthouse at Port Ontario, and the village of Pulaski is nearby.

==== Jefferson County ====
Route 3 continues to carry the Seaway Trail north along the eastern shore of Lake Ontario. East of Sackets Harbor, Route 3 turns east toward the city of Watertown. The Seaway Trail instead turns north again along NY 180. Just north of the village of Dexter, the trail turns northwest along NY 12E. Route 12E passes through the village of Chaumont and turns west around Chaumont Bay, then turns northwest again to Cape Vincent. Here, Route 12E turns sharply to the northeast, just one-eighth of a mile (200 m) from the shore at the headwaters of the St. Lawrence River. Canada, specifically Wolfe Island, is just across a narrow channel. Route 12E continues northeast along the river. Route 12E ends at its parent route, NY 12, in the village of Clayton. Route 12 continues to carry the Seaway Trail northeast to the county line, passing through Alexandria Bay.

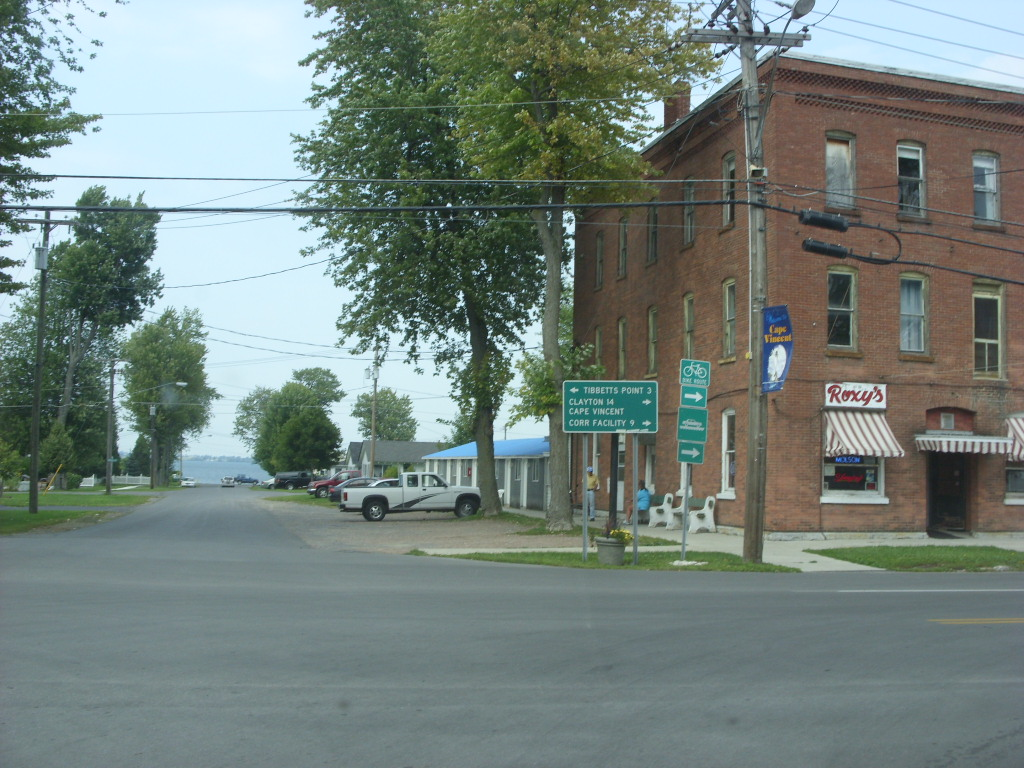
The sharp, 90-degree turn on NY 12E in Cape Vincent. Lake Ontario is visible in the background.

Seaway Trail, Inc., is headquartered in Sackets Harbor, and the Seaway Trail Discovery Center is located there. There are several lighthouses along this section of the trail, and the Thousand Islands resort region begins here. The city of Watertown, not far from the trail, has several attractions as well. Nearby state parks include Southwick Beach State Park, Westcott Beach State Park, Long Point State Park, Burnham Point State Park, Cedar Point State Park, Grass Point State Park, Wellesley Island State Park, Keewaydin State Park, and Kring Point State Park.

==== St. Lawrence County ====
The Seaway Trail enters the state's largest county along Route 12, heading northeast. It passes through Chippewa Bay and Oak Point before reaching NY 37, Route 12's northern terminus. The trail continues northeast along Route 37 to just outside the city of Ogdensburg. There, it follows NY 68, the Downtown Arterial Highway, which runs closer to the St. Lawrence River than Route 37. After crossing the Oswegatchie River mouth, the trail leaves Route 68 and winds its way through the western half of the city, eventually reaching NY 812, which it traverses for one-fifth of a mile (320 m) to get back to Route 37.

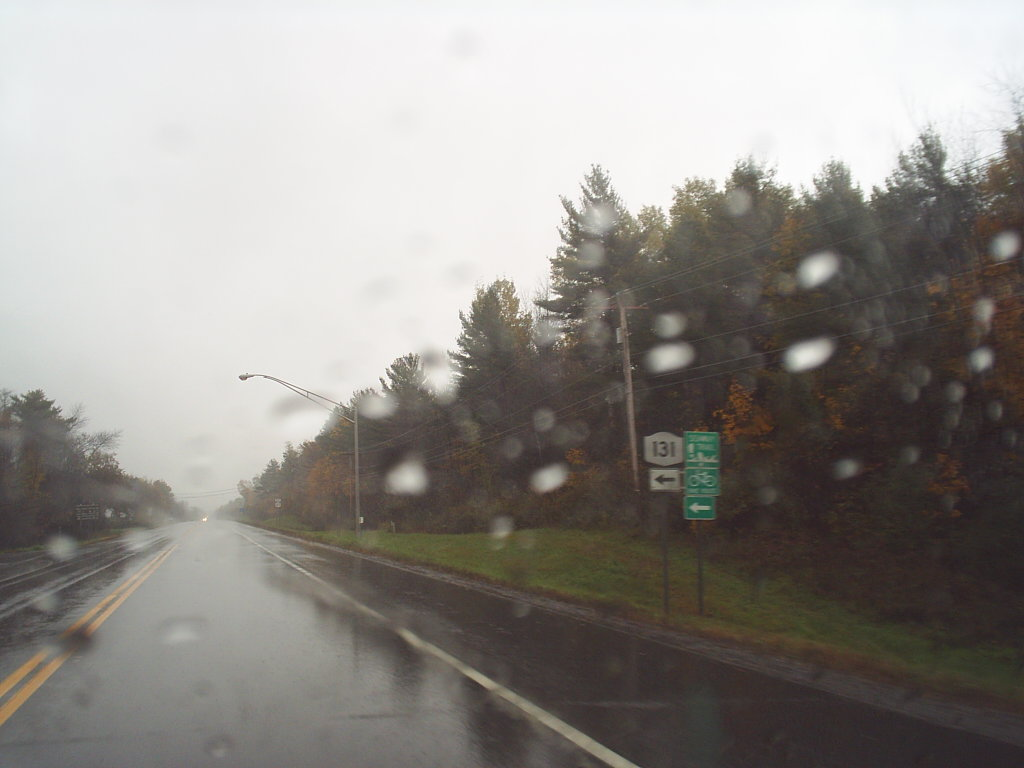
NY 37 east at NY 131, where the Seaway Trail turns to follow the latter

Route 37 continues northeast and starts to turn slightly eastward as it approaches the top of New York State, passing through the village of Waddington. At NY 131's western terminus, the trail switches to Route 131, which runs north of the village of Massena rather than through it. Past the city, Route 131 turns south toward its eastern terminus at Route 37. Route 37 then carries the trail to the hamlet of Rooseveltown in the town of Massena, where the Seaway Trail ends just shy of the Franklin County line.

Travelers finding themselves at the end of the trail can cross the border into Canada on the Seaway International Bridge, traversing a thin wedge of Quebec before ending up in Cornwall, Ontario. This is the point at which New York's northern border straightens out and proceeds due east (along the 45th parallel north) rather than following the St. Lawrence River, which cuts through Quebec.

Attractions along this northeasternmost segment of the Seaway Trail include Singer Castle, the Frederic Remington Art Museum in Ogdensburg, the Eisenhower Locks on the river near Massena, and a few more historic lighthouses. State parks in this area include Jacques Cartier State Park, Eel Weir State Park, Coles Creek State Park, St. Lawrence State Park, and Robert Moses State Park. The Thousand Islands resort area also continues through this region.

== History ==
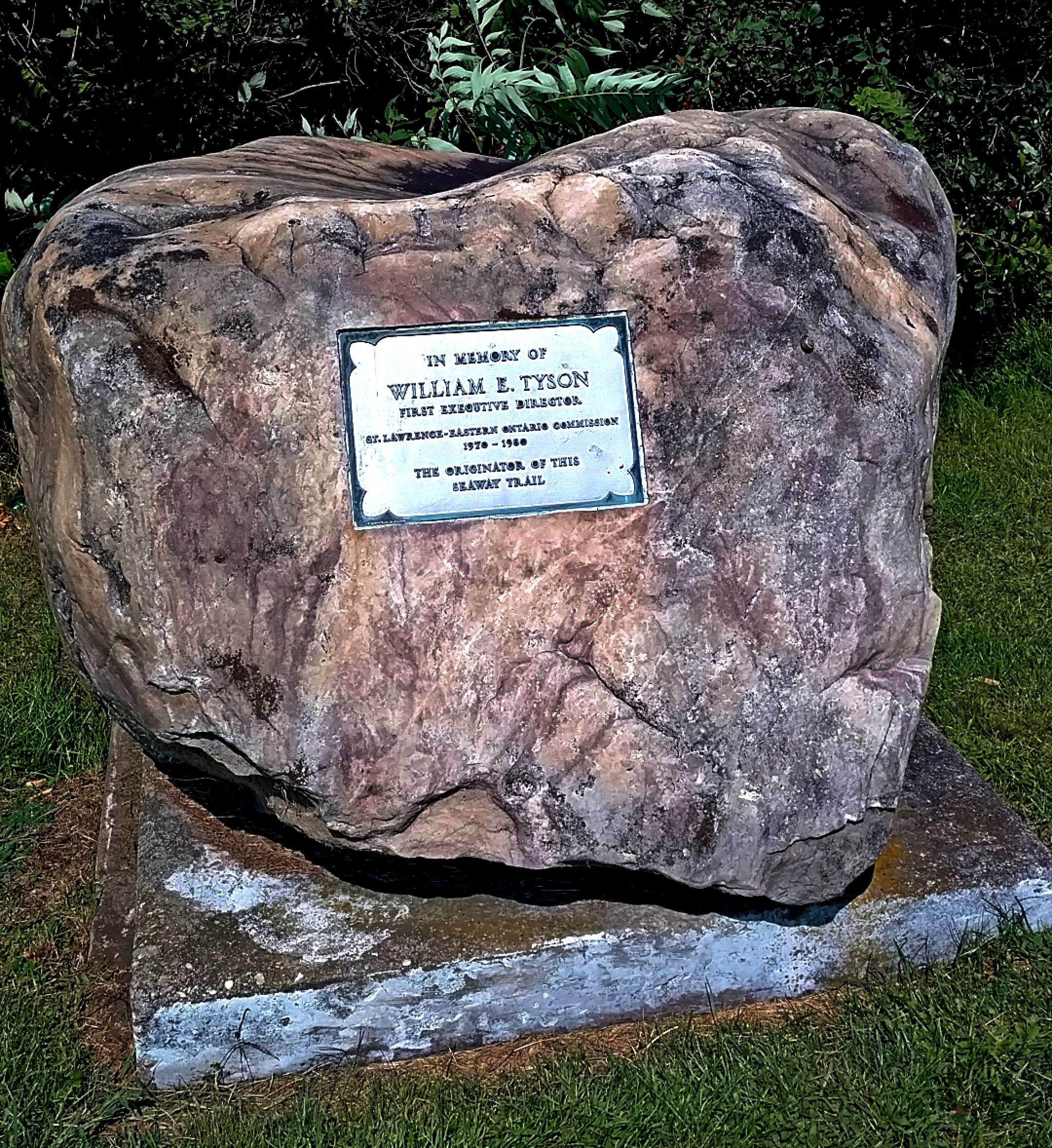
Monument to Seaway Trail founder William E. Tyson on New York State Route 3, overlooking Henderson Harbor, New York

The Seaway Trail was conceived in 1978 by William E. Tyson, executive director of the St. Lawrence-Eastern Ontario Commission, whose initial work led to the New York State Legislature designating the trail in 1980. It was originally an 80-mile (129 km) byway extending from the Thousand Islands Bridge to the Seaway International Bridge by way of a series of highways paralleling the Saint Lawrence Seaway. Signage for the trail was erected shortly afterward by the New York State Department of Transportation. It received its first designation in 1983 when it was recognized as a National Recreation Trail by the National Park Service. The trail was extended southwestward around the edge of Lake Ontario to Niagara Falls in 1984 and along the shores of the Niagara River and Lake Erie to the Pennsylvania state line in 1986, completing the byway's modern 454-mile (731 km) alignment within New York. It was later designated as a New York State Scenic Byway.

On September 19, 1996, the Seaway Trail was one of the first 20 byways nationwide to be named a National Scenic Byway by the United States Department of Transportation. That same year, Seaway Trail, Inc., the non-profit organization maintaining the byway, reached an agreement with the state of Pennsylvania that extended the byway another 50 miles (80 km) southwestward to the Ohio state line, bringing the route's total length to 518 miles (834 km). This extension of the Seaway Trail became a Pennsylvania Scenic Byway on August 8, 2003, and a National Scenic Byway on September 22, 2005, making the Seaway Trail the first and, thus far, only interstate byway in the region. The route was recognized as one of the "Top 50 Most Comfortable Touring Drives" in the nation by the Goodyear Tire and Rubber Company in October 2010.

The former Seaway Trail marker, officially used from 1978 to 2010

Since its inception in 1978, the trailblazers along the byway had been white-on-green signs with a pair of footprints adjacent to the words "Seaway Trail". On June 22, 2010, the Seaway Trail unveiled a new marker design as part of a larger rebranding of the byway itself, which was renamed the Great Lakes Seaway Trail. According to Seaway Trail, Inc. president Teresa Mitchell, research revealed that the Seaway Trail name was publicly associated more with the Saint Lawrence Seaway than the Great Lakes region, prompting the change. An extension of the Seaway Trail further westward into the Great Lakes—specifically Ohio—was considered in December 2000; however, that state established the Lake Erie Coastal Ohio Trail instead.

The area along the Seaway Trail was a major front in the War of 1812. At the time, Canada was still a British territory, and the waters dividing the United States and Canada often saw battle. Throughout the Seaway Trail, travelers can find 42 special brown-and-white "War of 1812" markers, designating sites significant to the war.

== Major intersections ==
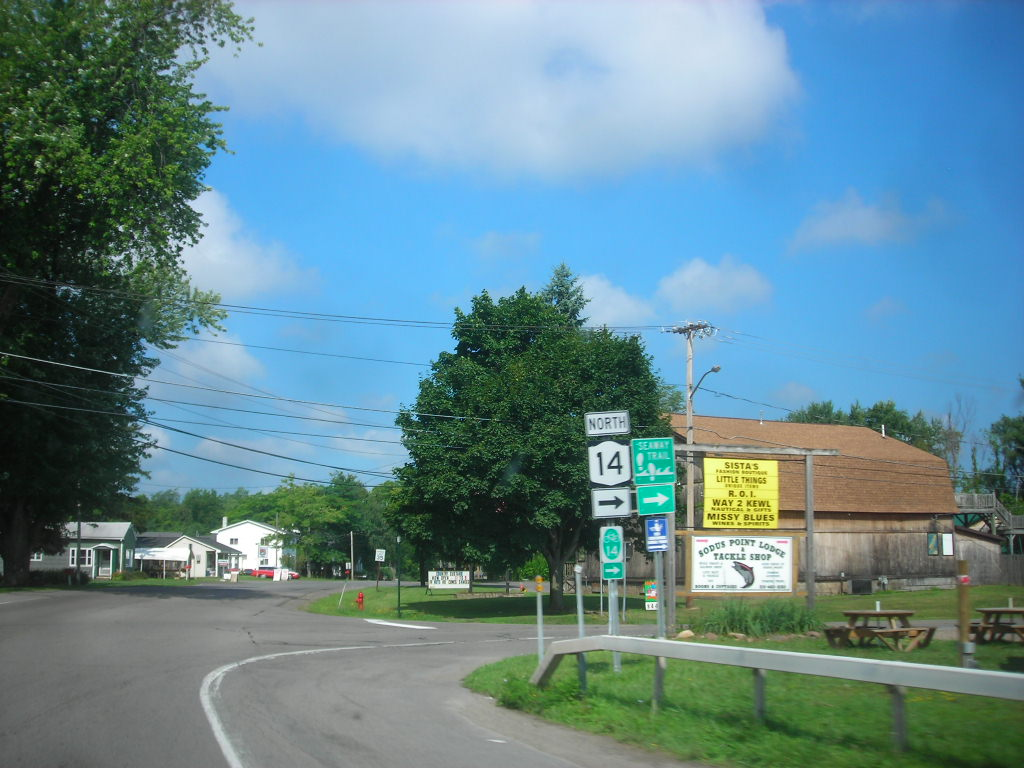
The Seaway Trail at NY 14 in Alton

The Seaway Trail connects to these highways of regional importance:

- I-79 in Erie, Pennsylvania
- NY 394 near Westfield, New York
- New York State Thruway (I-90) near Silver Creek, New York
- US 62 via NY 75 near Hamburg, New York
- I-190 in Niagara Falls, New York
- NY 98 in Carlton, New York
- NY 390 in Greece, New York
- NY 590 in Irondequoit, New York (near Rochester)
- NY 14 in Alton, New York
- NY 481 in Oswego, New York
- NY 13 near Pulaski, New York
- NY 3 near Watertown, New York
- I-81 at the Thousand Islands
- NY 26 in Alexandria Bay, New York
- NY 812 in Ogdensburg, New York
- NY 56 in Massena, New York
