= St. Lawrence Reservation =

Former protected area in New York state

Coordinates: 44°16′N 76°03′W

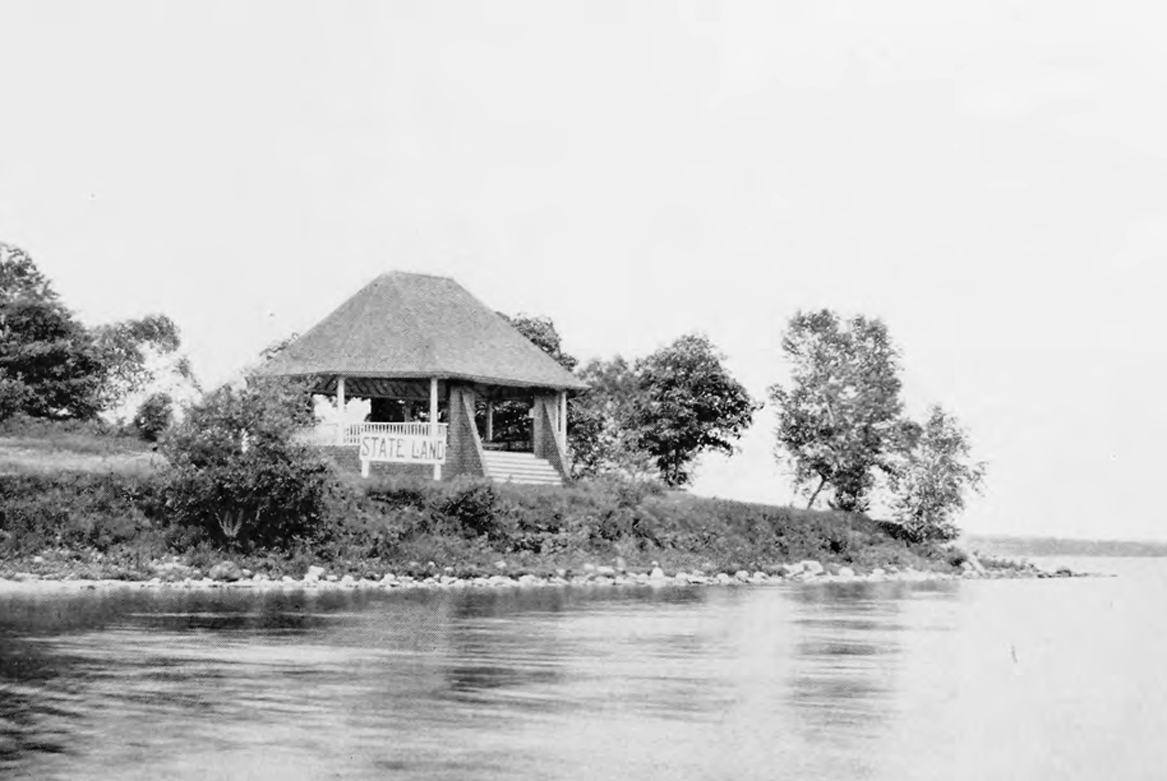
View c. 1901 of pavilion and "State Land" sign at Canoe Point, among the first parcels purchased for the St. Lawrence Reservation

The St. Lawrence Reservation (originally known as the State Reservation on the St. Lawrence) was a former protected area established by the U.S. state of New York in the Thousand Islands region along the St. Lawrence River in the late 19th century. The reservation's parks were some of the earliest lands purchased by New York State for the purposes of recreation and land preservation.

Initially intended to become part of an international park with islands protected by Canada, properties acquired by New York for the reservation are today managed as independent state parks by the New York State Office of Parks, Recreation and Historic Preservation. Islands that comprised the Canadian portion of the never-realized international park are today part of the Thousand Islands National Park.

== History ==
During the latter half of the 19th century, the Thousand Islands region increasingly became the focus of outdoor recreation, tourism, and private development. The New York side of the St. Lawrence River in particular became host to a number of lavish private estates built by wealthy newcomers to the region, to the exclusion of recreational visitors; in addition, river anglers grew frustrated with the impacts of illegal fishing and the lack of enforcement of game laws. In response to what they viewed as the spoiling of a formerly open and abundant recreational resource, some of the region's residents and sportsmen began to recognize the need for protection of lands and waters on both sides of the river's international border.

Among the principle proponents of an international park in the Thousand Islands was the Anglers' Association of the St. Lawrence River, who were concerned with protecting the river's fishing resources from commercial exploitation. The association included prominent landowners from both the American and Canadian sides of the river, and during the 1880s they began to lobby both governments to establish consistent regulations and set aside public lands for recreational purposes.

=== Development by New York ===
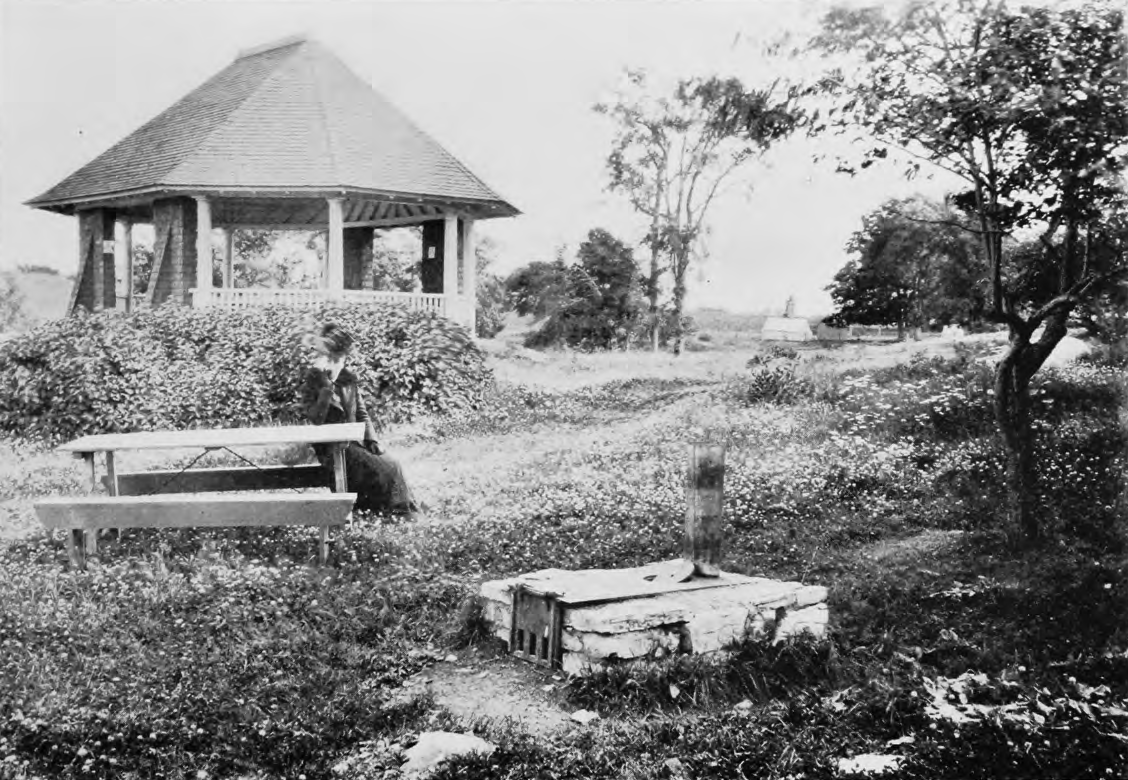
Pavilion and picnic area at Cedar Point, c. 1901

In 1896, the "State Reservation on the St. Lawrence" was officially established by the New York State Legislature, who designated "all that part of the river Saint Lawrence lying and being within the state of New York, with the islands therein" as an international park. The newly created reservation was placed under the control of the New York State Fisheries, Game and Forest Commission, who were charged with creating laws and regulations pertaining to state lands within the reservation.

Prior to the reservation's creation, the state of New York did not own any land within the newly protected region, which spanned approximately 100 miles (160 km) of the river. The Fisheries, Game and Forest Commission began purchasing properties in 1897, having been authorized to spend $30,000 to acquire lands for the reservation. Difficulties arose when some landowners significantly inflated their asking prices upon learning of the state's interest in the region; in response, the state considered taking legal action against some property owners. Local municipalities, particularly Ogdensburg and Clayton, also fought over where the state should focus their establishment of parks.

By 1898, the Fisheries, Game and Forest Commission had purchased the following properties to be included within the reservation:

- Burnham's Point (near Cape Vincent)
- Cedar Point (between Cape Vincent and Clayton)
- Canoe Point (on Grindstone Island)
- Watterson's Point (on the northern shore of Wellesley Island)
- Mary Island (near Alexandria Bay)
- Kring's Point (north of Alexandria Bay)
- Cedar Island (in Chippewa Bay, west of Hammond)
- Lotus Island (nine miles [14 km] below Ogdensburg)
- De Wolf Point (on Wellesley Island's interior Lake of the Isles)

Mary Island and Canoe Point were both purchased in 1897; the remainder were acquired in 1898. Among the early locations intended for inclusion in the reservation was a peninsula known as Cement Point on Grindstone Island; however it was eventually declined by the state due to uncertainty regarding its legal ownership. These purchases were some of the earliest actions taken by New York State to preserve lands for recreational purposes, preceded only by the protection of the Forest Preserve and the Niagara Reservation.

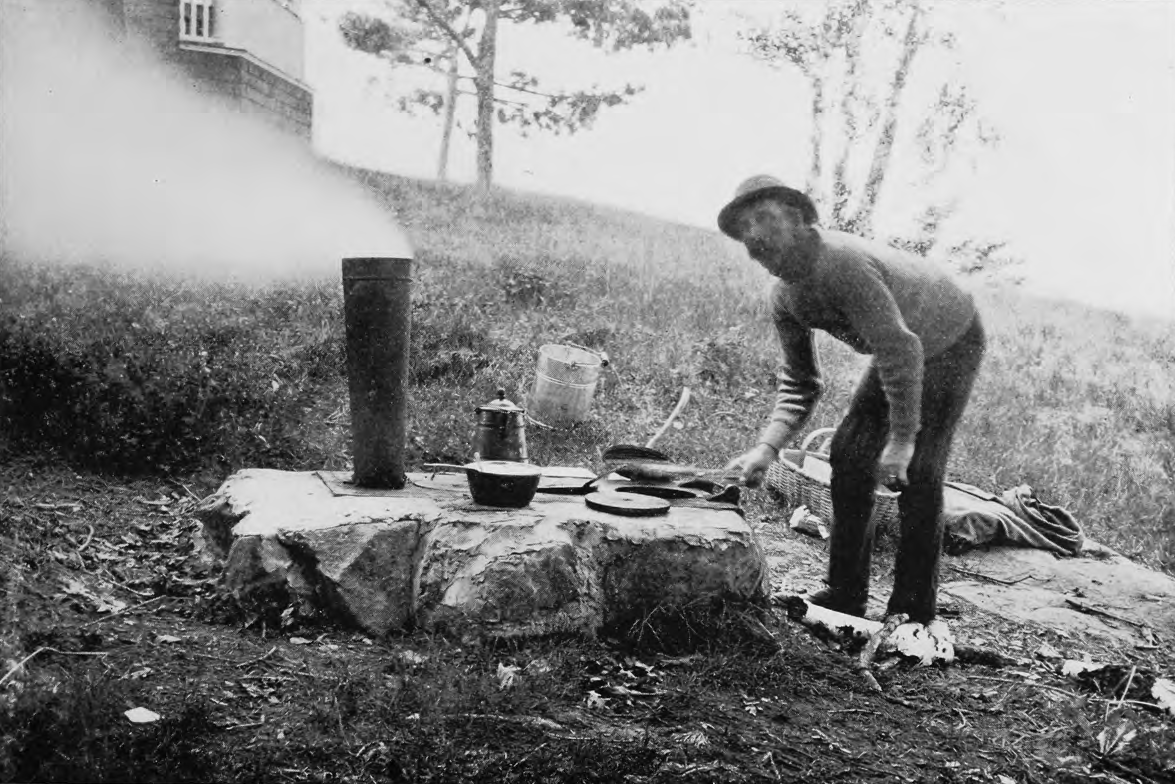
A camper makes use of a cooking stove installed at Watterson's Point, c. 1901

The state-owned reservation lands were intended to facilitate picnicking and camping by boaters on the St. Lawrence River. To this end, the state quickly enacted improvements on their new lands. By the close of 1899, most of the parks included piers suitable for steamboats, docks for smaller watercraft, and pavilions. To prevent wildfires, cooking stoves were constructed at most parks for use of campers.

In 1911, the reservation's name was officially adopted as the "St. Lawrence Reservation", and the area was simultaneously expanded to include portions of Lake Ontario adjacent to Jefferson County, including several bays (Chaumont Bay, Guffins Bay, Black River Bay and Henderson Bay) and their islands. Long Point on Chaumont Bay was purchased to be included in the reservation in 1913. By the late 1920s, Grass Point had been purchased by the state, and would be the last parcel to be added to the reservation.

=== Development by Canada ===
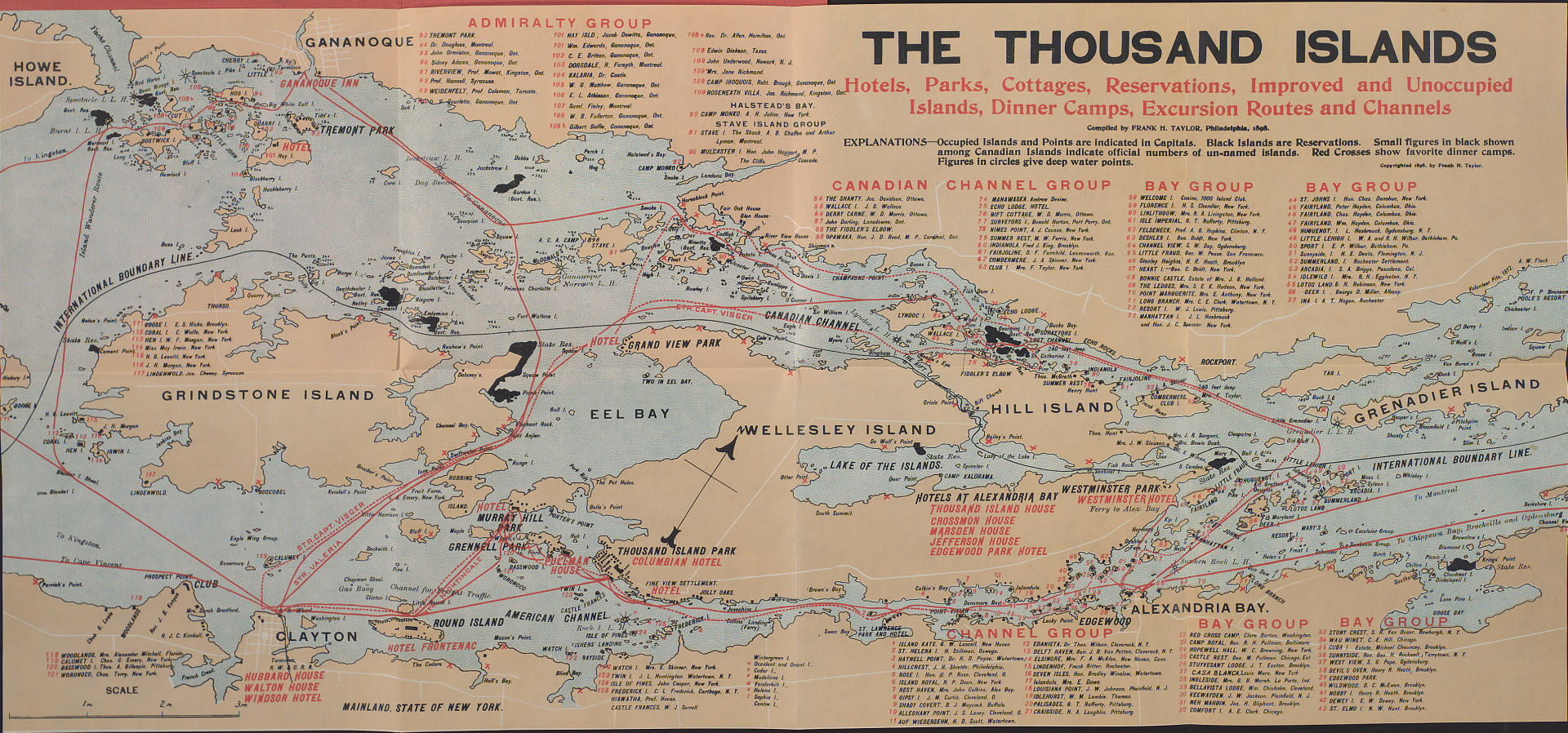
An 1898 map showing the locations of both American and Canadian public lands (in black) in the Thousand Islands region

Concurrent with the initial actions of New York State to develop recreational grounds in the Thousand Islands, the Canadian government also moved to protect islands within their jurisdiction. By 1896, Canada had identified 11 islands for potential protection and recreational development within the region.

In contrast to New York, Canada did not need to purchase islands in order to protect them from further development. An agreement between the Mississaugas and Canada had kept the title of many St. Lawrence River islands in the hands of Canada, and only beginning in the 1880s was the agreement modified to allow for sale of the islands to private individuals. In 1904, 11 islands were officially purchased by Canada to form the basis of the St. Lawrence National Park, known today as Thousand Islands National Park. The recreational facilities that were subsequently developed on the Canadian islands were similar to those found on the American side of the river.

=== The parks today ===
Although public parks were developed on both sides of the St. Lawrence River, a formal international park never materialized. Contrary to early intentions and attempts to harmonize fishing laws and other regulations on both sides of the border, laws ultimately diverged in the early 20th century; in addition, the United States federal government did not involve themselves with the parks on the American side of the river. Despite the lack of formal agreement binding the Canadian and American parks, New York continued to market the Thousand Islands as being an "international park" as late as 1929.

In 1932, direct control of the majority of the St. Lawrence Reservation's parks was removed from the Conservation Department's Division of Lands and Forests (successor of the Fisheries, Game and Forest Commission) and placed in the hands of the newly created Thousand Islands State Park Commission, a governor-appointed board that reported to the Conservation Department's Division of Parks. With the change in leadership, work began to develop the reservation's lands into independent state parks. The formal definition of the St. Lawrence Reservation was removed from the Lands and Forests Law in 1963, in recognition of the fact that the defined lands were no longer under the jurisdiction of the Conservation Department's Division of Lands and Forests.

The former reservation's parks are today managed by the Thousand Islands Region of the New York State Office of Parks, Recreation and Historic Preservation, along with additional state parks along the St. Lawrence River that were procured after the creation of the Thousand Islands State Park Commission.

== See also ==
- List of New York state parks
- List of National Parks of Canada
