= Hammond (village), New York =

Hammond, New York
- Village
- Location within the state of New York
- Coordinates: 44°26′53″N 75°41′36″W
- Country: United States
- State: New York
- County: St. Lawrence

Area
  - Total: 0.59 sq mi (1.52 km^{2})
  - Land: 0.59 sq mi (1.52 km^{2})
  - Water: 0 sq mi (0.00 km^{2})
- Elevation: 358 ft (109 m)

Population (2020)
  - Total: 273
  - Density: 466.2/sq mi (179.99/km^{2})
- Time zone: UTC-5 (Eastern (EST))
  - Summer (DST): UTC-4 (EDT)
- ZIP code: 13646
- Area code: Area code 315
- FIPS code: 36-31830
- GNIS feature ID: 0976404
- Website: https://www.hammondnewyork.com/

Hammond is a village in St. Lawrence County, New York, United States. The population was 280 at the 2010 census. The village is named after an early landowner.

The Village of Hammond is near the center of the Town of Hammond at the western corner of the county.

== History ==
The original landowner of the town was Abijah Hammond. The village was formerly known as "Hammond Corners."

== Geography ==
Hammond is located at 44°26′53″N 75°41′35″W (44.44815, -75.693318).

According to the United States Census Bureau, the village has a total area of 0.6 square mile (1.5 km^{2}), all land.

Hammond lies at the junction of County Road 6 (St. Lawrence Avenue/Lake Street) and New York State Route 37 (Main Street).

While bordering neither, the village is between the St. Lawrence River and Black Lake.

== Demographics ==
Historical population
| Census | Pop. | Note | %± |
|---|---|---|---|
| 1910 | 404 | | — |
| 1920 | 409 | | 1.2% |
| 1930 | 364 | | −11.0% |
| 1940 | 323 | | −11.3% |
| 1950 | 329 | | 1.9% |
| 1960 | 314 | | −4.6% |
| 1970 | 273 | | −13.1% |
| 1980 | 271 | | −0.7% |
| 1990 | 270 | | −0.4% |
| 2000 | 302 | | 11.9% |
| 2010 | 280 | | −7.3% |
| 2020 | 273 | | −2.5% |
U.S. Decennial Census

As of the census of 2000, there were 302 people, 125 households, and 81 families residing in the village. The population density was 516.5 inhabitants per square mile (199.4/km^{2}). There were 144 housing units at an average density of 246.3 per square mile (95.1/km^{2}). The racial makeup of the village was 98.68% White, 0.33% Native American, 0.33% Pacific Islander, and 0.66% from two or more races.

There were 125 households, out of which 32.8% had children under the age of 18 living with them, 52.0% were married couples living together, 9.6% had a female householder with no husband present, and 35.2% were non-families. 33.6% of all households were made up of individuals, and 16.8% had someone living alone who was 65 years of age or older. The average household size was 2.42 and the average family size was 3.11.

In the village, the population was spread out, with 30.5% under the age of 18, 4.3% from 18 to 24, 26.2% from 25 to 44, 20.5% from 45 to 64, and 18.5% who were 65 years of age or older. The median age was 37 years. For every 100 females, there were 85.3 males. For every 100 females age 18 and over, there were 81.0 males.

The median income for a household in the village was $22,159, and the median income for a family was $25,313. Males had a median income of $35,625 versus $23,750 for females. The per capita income for the village was $12,399. About 11.8% of families and 15.0% of the population were below the poverty line, including 11.1% of those under the age of eighteen and 17.2% of those 65 or over.

== Education ==
The village is in the Hammond Central School District.
