= Lake Road (Western New York) =

Highway in New York

- Map of Monroe and Wayne counties with Lake Road highlighted in red

Route information
- Maintained by Monroe County, Wayne County, and the village of Sodus Point
- Length: 28.94 mi (46.57 km)

Major junctions
- West end: Irondequoit Bay Outlet Bridge in Webster
- CR 120 in Pultneyville
- East end: NY 14 in Sodus Point

Location
- Country: United States
- State: New York
- Counties: Monroe, Wayne

Highway system
- New York Highways; Interstate; US; State; Reference; Parkways

Lake Road is an east–west roadway in western New York in the United States. It extends for 29 miles (47 km) from the Irondequoit Bay Outlet Bridge in the Monroe County town of Webster to New York State Route 14 (NY 14) in the Wayne County village of Sodus Point. As its name implies, it follows the southern shore of Lake Ontario for its entire length. Lake Road serves as the northern terminus of NY 250 and was once the northern terminus of NY 21. The entirety of the roadway east of Bay Road in Webster is part of the Seaway Trail, a National Scenic Byway.

The portion of Lake Road west of NY 250 in Webster became part of NY 18 in the early 1930s. NY 18 never extended eastward from its junction with NY 250. In the early 1970s, NY 18 was truncated to NY 104 in Rochester. The section of Lake Road west of NY 250 remained state-maintained as an unsigned reference route for some time afterward; however, ownership of the roadway was transferred from the state of New York to Monroe County as part of a highway maintenance swap that took effect on November 26, 2007. All of Lake Road west of Sodus Point is now county-maintained as County Route 1 (CR 1) in Monroe County and County Route 101 in Wayne County; however, the road is commonly known by its road name instead. The portion within Sodus Point is locally maintained.

== Route description ==
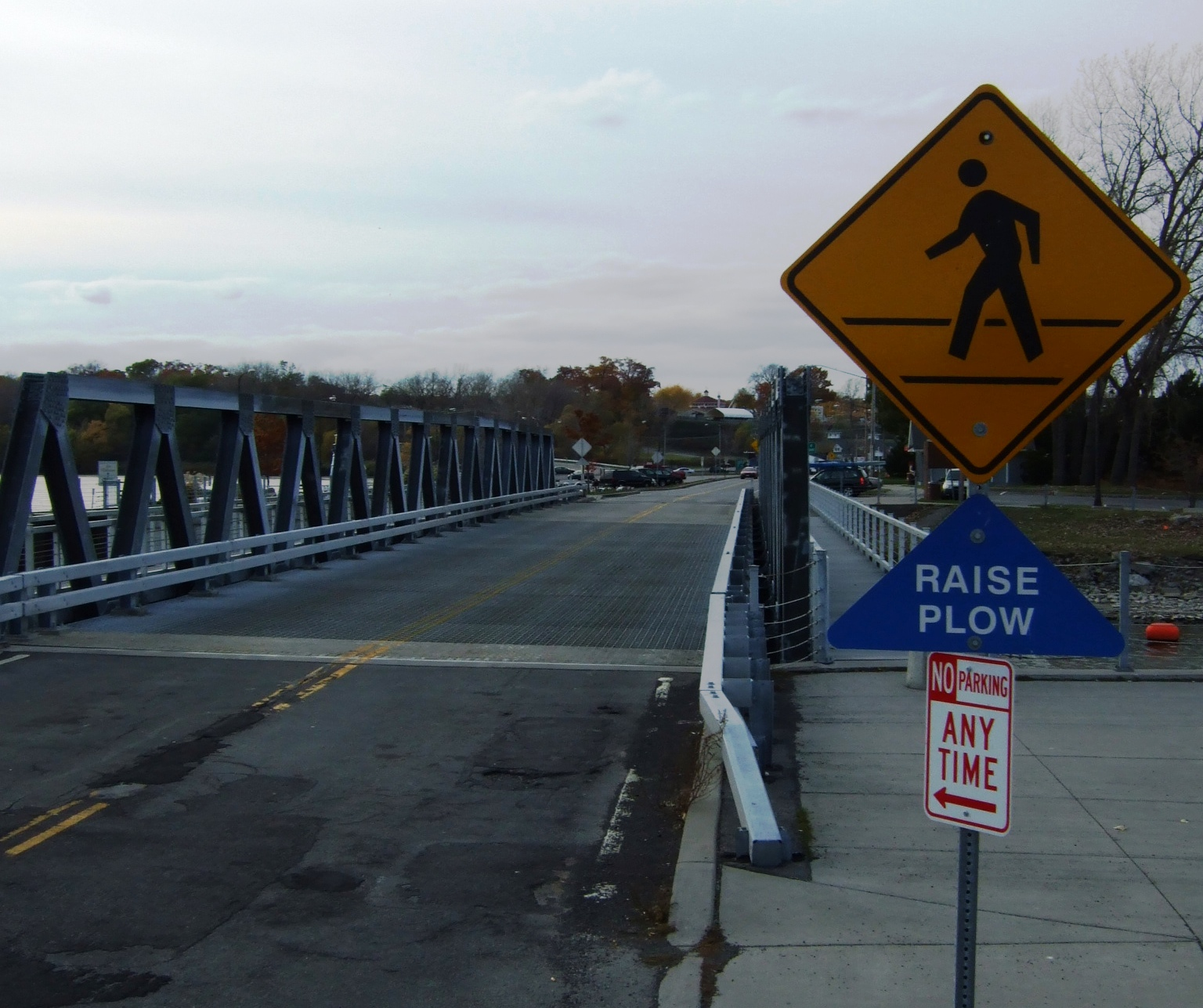
Western terminus of Lake Road in Webster

Lake Road begins at the eastern approach to the Irondequoit Bay Outlet Bridge in the town of Webster. The bridge is a seasonal bridge; it is swung out of the way and closed to vehicular traffic from April 1 to November 1 to allow boat traffic to pass between Irondequoit Bay and Lake Ontario through the Outlet. During the winter months, it connects to Culver Road on the opposite side of the Outlet. Lake Road heads east as unsigned CR 1 along a narrow peninsula separating the bay from the lake, serving a variety of seaside structures. Just east of the peninsula, Lake Road intersects Bay Road (CR 16), a roadway that serves as a primary eastern bayside route.

The road continues along the lakeshore through the hamlet of Forest Lawn, a small community in northern Webster. It eventually intersects the northern terminus of NY 250. Past NY 250, Lake Road meets local north–south roadways before crossing into Wayne County and the town of Ontario. At the county line, Lake Road intersects County Line Road, a highway maintained here by Wayne County as CR 100, a designation signed only on blade signs for the roadway. Meanwhile, Lake Road continues on as CR 101, intersecting with local roads and heading through a small, residential community known as Ontario-on-the-Lake.

East of the community, Lake Road intersects with Lakeside Road (CR 102). This intersection is the northern terminus of the county designation, with Lakeside Road continuing north as a town highway. Lake Road continues through a short residential stretch that has fields along its northern side. After an intersection with North Slocum Road, Lake Road continues through fields, and eventually passes the R. E. Ginna Nuclear Power Plant. The road continues on, intersecting Ontario Center Road (which leads to NY 350), Knickerbocker Road (CR 108) and Furnace Road (CR 110) as it heads along the Lake Ontario shoreline and enters the town of Williamson.

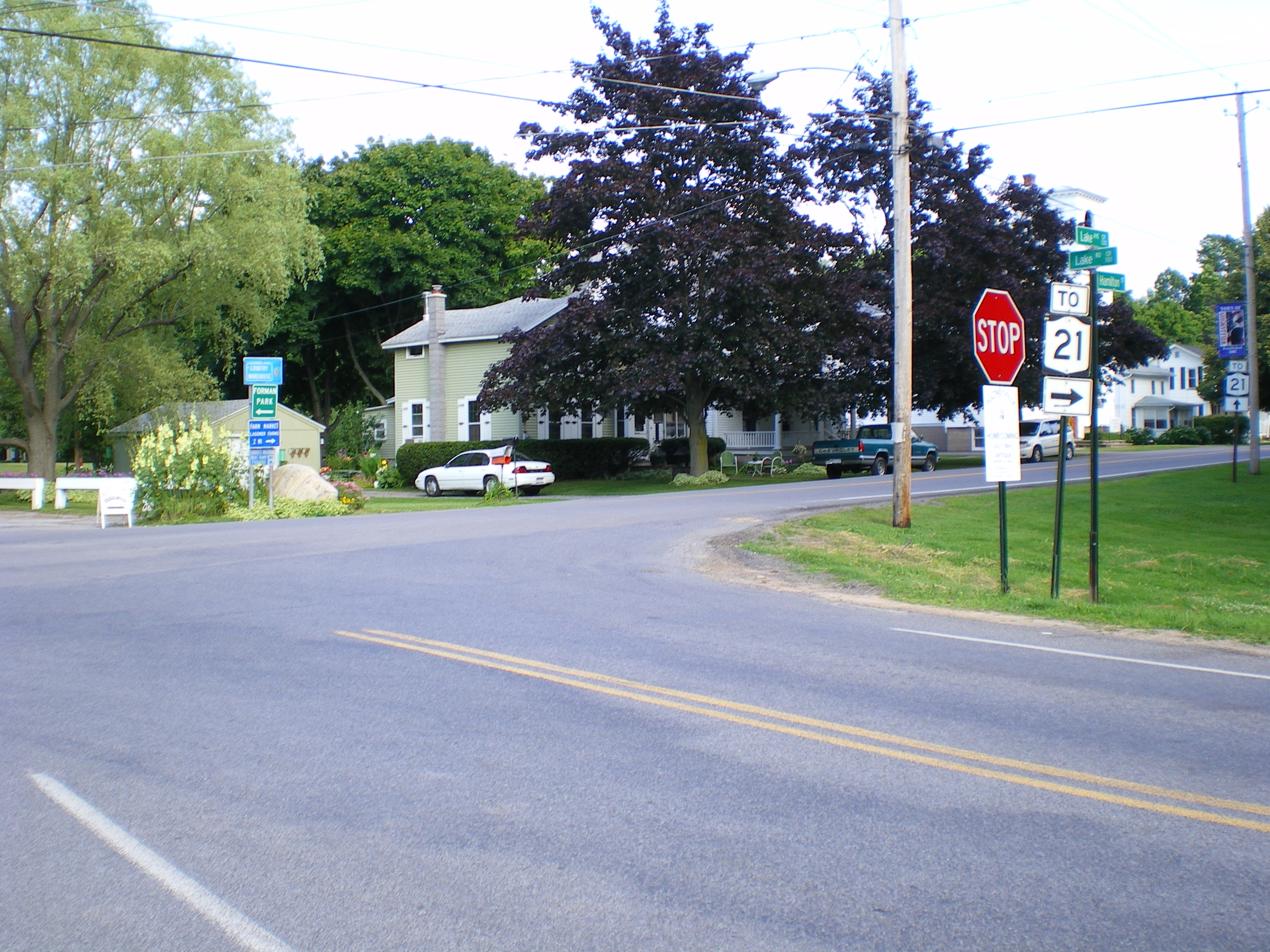
Lake Road at Hamilton Street in Pultneyville. The latter was once part of NY 21.

In Williamson, the fields continue, this time to the south of the highway, as lakeside homes run along the northern side. The route begins its way on a northeast stretch, passing by residential homes and fields. It intersects Stoney Lonesome Road (CR 112) on its way to Pultneyville, a large lakeside hamlet. Inside the community, it intersects Hamilton Street (CR 120) at a junction that was once the northern terminus of NY 21.

Outside of Pultneyville, Lake Road continues along the shoreline, intersecting with several roads of local importance. At East Townline Road (CR 118), Lake Road passes into the town of Sodus. East of the town line, the highway curves southeast to follow a more inland routing. It intersects Maple Avenue (CR 134), a north–south highway leading to the village of Sodus, then returns northeastward as it approaches the village of Sodus Point. It intersects North Geneva Road (CR 140) west of the village, then enters Sodus Point. CR 101 ends at the village line, and the final mile (1.6 km) of Lake Road is maintained by the village of Sodus Point. Lake Road continues east through the western portion of the village to NY 14, where Lake Road ends and continues east as Bay Street for a half-mile before becoming dead-ended Greig Street, both part of NY 14.

The entirety of Lake Road east of Bay Road in Webster is part of the Seaway Trail, a National Scenic Byway.

== History ==
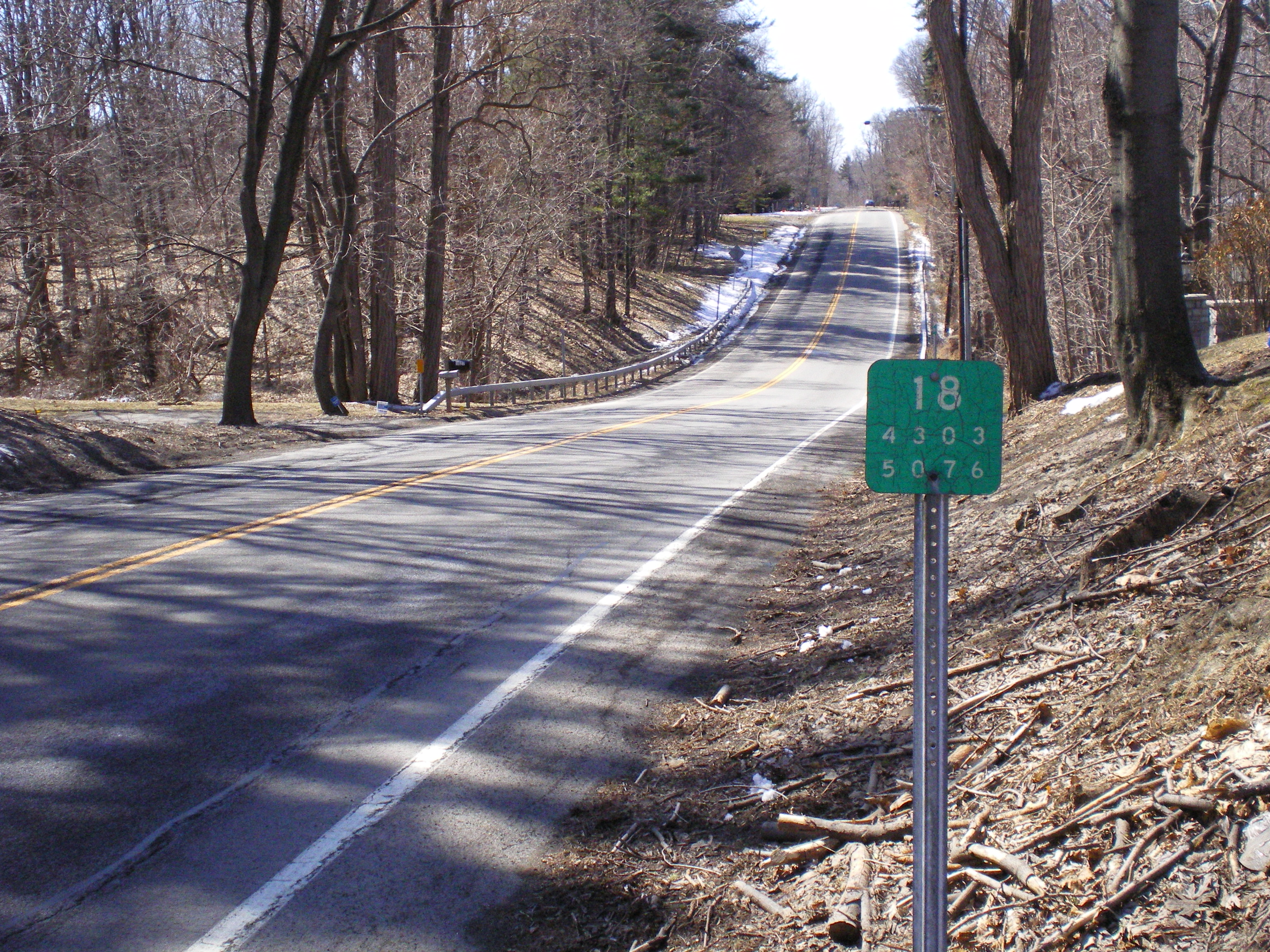
Reference marker for NY 18 on Lake Road in Webster in March 2008. By this time, Lake Road was no longer maintained by the state.

In the 1930 renumbering of state highways in New York, NY 18 was extended eastward from its original terminus in Buffalo to a new terminus in Rochester. NY 18 was extended again by the following year to end at an intersection with NY 250 in Webster. In between the Irondequoit Bay Outlet and NY 250, NY 18 utilized Lake Road. Although Lake Road continued east to Sodus Point, NY 18 never extended any farther eastward than its junction with NY 250. NY 18 was truncated c. 1973 to NY 104 in the area of Rochester known as Kodak Park. The former routing of NY 18 east of the north end of the Sea Breeze Expressway became NY 941L, an unsigned reference route. At some point between 2004 and 2007, the definition of NY 941L was altered to include only Lake Road; that is, the portion of NY 18's former routing from the Irondequoit Bay Outlet Bridge to NY 250.

In 2007, ownership and maintenance of NY 941L was transferred from the state of New York to Monroe County as part of a highway maintenance swap between the two levels of government. A bill (S4856, 2007) to enact the swap was introduced in the New York State Senate on April 23 and passed by both the Senate and the New York State Assembly on June 20. The act was signed into law by Governor Eliot Spitzer on August 28. Under the terms of the act, it took effect 90 days after it was signed into law; thus, the maintenance swap officially took place on November 26, 2007. The former routing of NY 941L became a westward extension of CR 1.

== Major intersections ==
County	Location	mi	km	Destinations	Notes
Monroe	Town of Webster	0.00	0.00	Irondequoit Bay Outlet Bridge	Western terminus of CR 1; continues west as Culver Road into Irondequoit
Monroe	Town of Webster	5.61	9.03	NY 250 south – Webster	Northern terminus of NY 250
Monroe–Wayne county line	Webster–Ontario town line	8.59	13.82	Eastern terminus of Monroe CR 1; western terminus of Wayne CR 101	
Wayne	Ontario	8.59	13.82	County Line Road (CR 100 south)	Northern terminus of CR 100
Wayne	Pultneyville	18.31	29.47	Hamilton Street (CR 120 south)	Former northern terminus of NY 21
Wayne	Sodus–Sodus Point town/village line	27.94	44.97	Eastern terminus of CR 101	
Wayne	Sodus Point	28.94	46.57	NY 14	
1.000 mi = 1.609 km; 1.000 km = 0.621 mi: Route transition

== See also ==
- List of county routes in Monroe County, New York
- List of county routes in Wayne County, New York
