= Cedar Island State Park =

State park in St. Lawrence County, New York

- Location within New York
- Interactive map of Cedar Island State Park
- Type: State park
- Location: Hammond, New York
- Nearest city: Alexandria Bay, New York
- Coordinates: 44°27′N 75°47′W
- Area: 10 acres (4.0 ha)
- Created: 1898
- Operator: New York State Office of Parks, Recreation and Historic Preservation
- Visitors: 1,928 (in 2014)
- Open: Late May through early September
- Camp sites: 18
- Website: Cedar Island State Park

Cedar Island State Park is a 10-acre (4.0 ha) state park located in the Town of Hammond in St. Lawrence County, New York. The park comprises half of Cedar Island, located in Chippewa Bay in the St. Lawrence River, part of the Thousand Islands region. The remainder of the island is privately owned.

The park was established in 1898 as part of the St. Lawrence Reservation.

== Park description ==
Cedar Island State Park is accessible only by boat. The park offers dockage, fishing, seasonal waterfowl hunting, pavilions, picnic tables, and a campground with 18 tent sites.

== See also ==
- List of New York state parks
