= Mary Island State Park =

State park in Jefferson County, New York

- Location within New York
- Type: State park
- Location: Wellesley Island; Town of Alexandria; Jefferson County, New York
- Coordinates: 44°22′01″N 75°55′12″W
- Area: 13 acres (0.053 km^{2})
- Created: 1897
- Operator: New York State Office of Parks, Recreation and Historic Preservation
- Visitors: 3,415 (in 2014)
- Open: Memorial Day to Labor Day
- Website: Mary Island State Park

Mary Island State Park is a 13-acre (5.3 ha) state park located in the St. Lawrence River in Jefferson County, New York. The park is situated in the Town of Alexandria on the east end of Wellesley Island, and is accessible only by boat.

== History ==
Mary Island State Park was purchased by the New York State Fisheries, Game and Forest Commission in 1897. Along with Canoe-Picnic Point State Park, it was one of the first New York state parks established along the St. Lawrence River as part of the St. Lawrence Reservation, a recreation area within the Thousand Islands region authorized by New York State in 1896.

== Description ==
Mary Island State Park is accessible only by boat. The park offers picnic tables, fishing, a boat launch and docks, and a campground for tents only. It is open from Memorial Day to Labor Day.

== See also ==
- List of New York state parks
