= Grindstone Island Upper Schoolhouse =

- U.S. National Register of Historic Places
- Location within New York Location within the United States
- Location: 41591 Cross Island Rd., on Grindstone Island, Clayton, New York
- Coordinates: 44°16′12″N 76°07′45″W
- Area: Less than 1 acre (0.40 ha)
- Built: 1885
- NRHP reference No.: 12000509
- Added to NRHP: August 14, 2012

Grindstone Island Upper Schoolhouse is a historic one-room school building located on Grindstone Island, Clayton, Jefferson County, New York. It was built in 1885, and is a 1 1/2-story, three bay by one bay, frame building on a granite foundation. The building includes a vestibule and small teachers apartment. Also on the property is a contributing well pump. It operated until 1989, making it the last one-room school in operation in New York State.

It was added to the National Register of Historic Places in 2012.
