= Canoe-Picnic Point State Park =

State park in Jefferson County, New York

- Location within New York
- Interactive map of Canoe-Picnic Point State Park
- Type: State park
- Location: 36661 Cedar Point State Park Drive; Clayton, New York
- Coordinates: 44°18′11″N 76°04′26″W
- Area: 70 acres (0.28 km^{2})
- Created: 1897
- Operator: New York State Office of Parks, Recreation and Historic Preservation
- Visitors: 8,143 (in 2020)
- Open: Late May to early September
- Website: Canoe-Picnic Point State Park

Canoe-Picnic Point State Park is a 70-acre (0.28 km^{2}) state park located on Grindstone Island in the St. Lawrence River. The park is within the bounds of the Town of Clayton in Jefferson County, New York.

The park was one of 80 New York State Parks that were in the path of totality for the 2024 solar eclipse, with the park experiencing 3 minutes and 20 seconds of totality.

== History ==
Canoe-Picnic Point State Park was purchased by the New York State Fisheries, Game and Forest Commission in 1897. Along with Mary Island State Park, it was one of the first New York state parks established along the St. Lawrence River as part of the St. Lawrence Reservation, a recreation area within the Thousand Islands region authorized by New York State in 1896.

Canoe Point is named for the American Canoe Association, who formerly held their annual meetings at the point.

== Park description ==
Canoe-Picnic Point State Park is accessible only by boat. The park offers a nature trail, picnic tables and pavilions, cabins, docks, fishing, hiking, and a campground with tent sites. The park's recreational facilities are open from late May to early September, although seasonal waterfowl hunting is also permitted within the park.

== See also ==
- List of New York state parks
