= Irondequoit Bay Outlet Bridge =

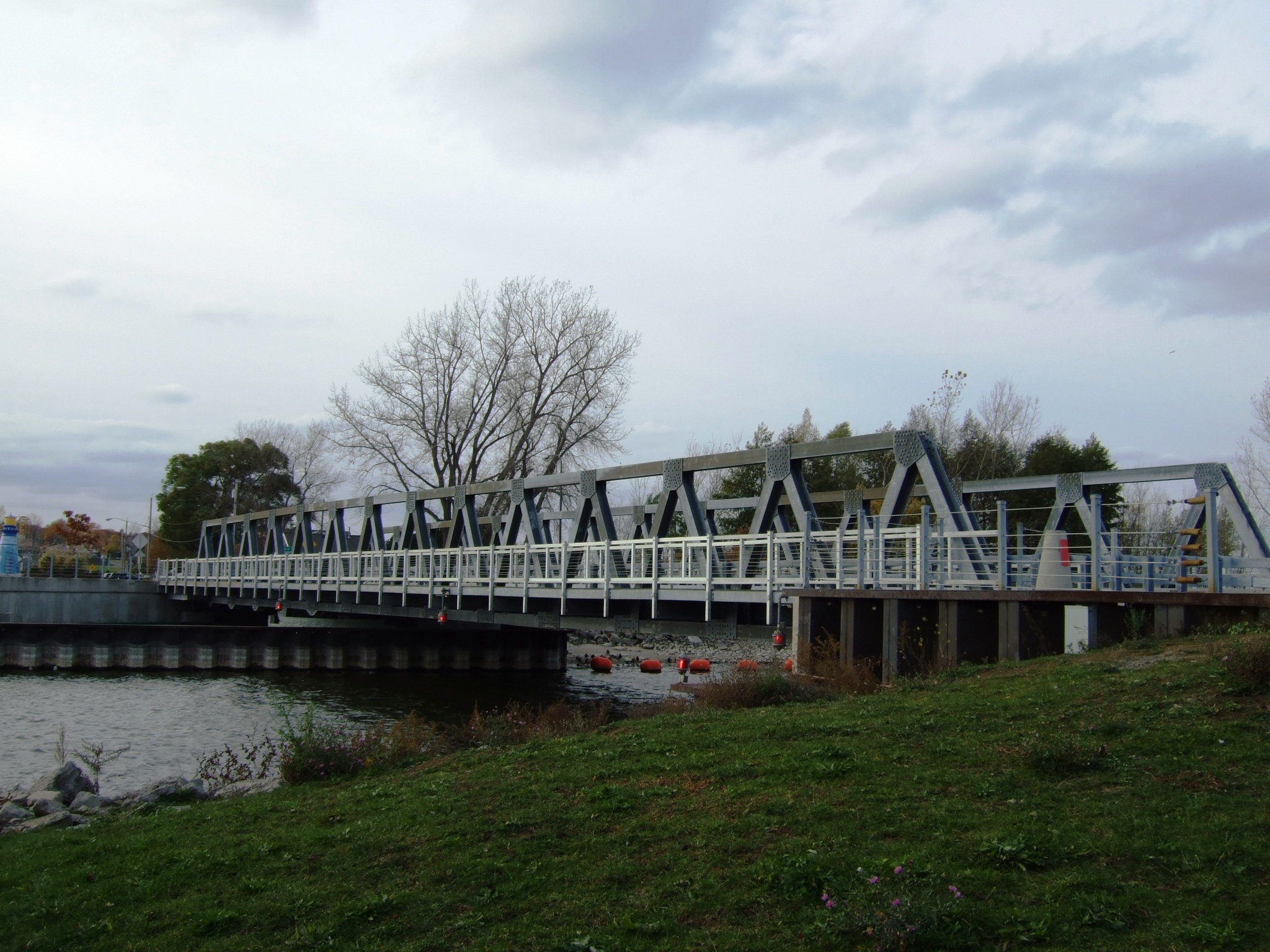
- The outlet bridge in its closed position.
- Coordinates: 43°14′05″N 77°32′03″W
- Carries: Two lanes of Culver Road and Lake Road
- Crosses: Outlet of Irondequoit Bay
- Locale: Irondequoit and Webster, New York
- Owner: Monroe County
- Maintained by: Monroe County

History
- Inaugurated: 1998

Location
- Interactive map of Irondequoit Bay Outlet Bridge

The Irondequoit Bay Outlet Bridge is a bobtail swing truss bridge in the northeastern suburbs of Rochester, New York, in the United States. It spans the outlet of Irondequoit Bay at Lake Ontario, carrying vehicular traffic between Culver Road in Irondequoit and Lake Road in Webster. The bridge is closed to vehicular traffic (bridge in open position) during the boating season from April to November, allowing marine traffic to travel between Lake Ontario and Irondequoit Bay. During the boating season, the bridge is a popular spot for visitors to watch the boat traffic, walk out onto the nearby jetties, and fish.

The swing bridge replaced a two-lane fixed timber bridge that existed from 1929 to 1985. The old bridge's removal was part of an U.S. Army Corps of Engineers project to open up the Irondequoit Bay to boating.

According to Monroe County, the concrete and steel bridge is 185.5 ft long (56.5 m) with two spans and a 24-foot (7.3 m) roadway; it was completed in 1998 for $4.8 million (including renovation of nearby Irondequoit Bay Marine Park). The bridge has a main span of 132.5 feet (40.4 m) on its eastern end with a counter-weighted 53-foot (16 m) span on its western end. To open or close the bridge requires about two hours of setup time, 30 minutes turning time and 2 hours of set-down time. The bridge weighs approximately 425 tons.

On the west side of the bridge there is a small public beach area, restrooms, and a jetty which protrudes out into the lake and terminates with a small lighthouse. A shorter jetty on the east side provides views of the lake and channel to the Webster visitors. Seabreeze Amusement Park is about 0.5 miles (0.80 km) southwest and visible from the overlooks.

The bridge may be used as an alternate route for the Seaway Trail when the bridge is open to traffic during the winter months.

Each year, the bridge is swung to the in-storage position (open to boaters) on April 1, after 9:00 am, and to the in-use position (open to vehicular traffic) on November 1. If April 1 happens to fall on a weekend day, then the bridge will be placed into storage on the Monday following the weekend. If November 1 happens to fall on a weekend day then the bridge will be put in-use on the Monday after the weekend.

A feasibility study has been conducted to explore options to provide year-round access across the Bay Outlet. A series of public meetings was held, including one on January 11, 2018, at Irondequoit Town Hall where highlights and findings from the draft report were shared. The highest scoring options involved changing the existing bridge.
