= Customs House (Sodus Point, New York) =

- U.S. National Register of Historic Places
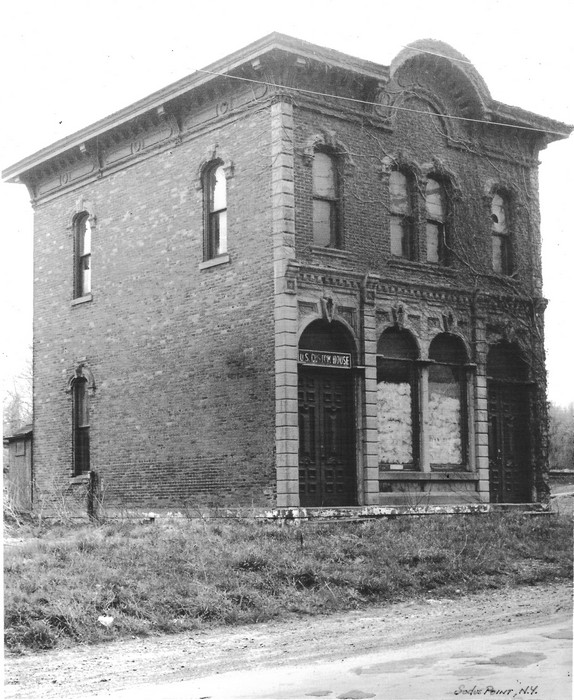
- Customs House Sodus Point, NY, 1999

- Location within New York Location within the United States
- Location: Sentell St., Sodus Point, New York
- Coordinates: 43°16′1″N 76°59′37″W
- Area: 0.4 acres (0.16 ha)
- Built: 1874
- Architectural style: Italianate
- NRHP reference No.: 80002787
- Added to NRHP: May 06, 1980

Customs House, also known as the Old Customs House, is a historic customs house located at Sodus Point in Wayne County, New York. It is a 25 feet wide by 35 feet deep, two-story, Italianate style brick structure with sandstone trim built in 1874. It was built originally as a bank building, then in 1885 was purchased by the Pennsylvania Railroad, who leased it to the U.S. government for use as a customs house and post office. Government use of the building ceased in 1968.

It was listed on the National Register of Historic Places in 1980.
