= Kring Point State Park =

State park in Jefferson County, New York

- Location within New York
- Type: State park
- Location: 25950 Kring Point Road; Redwood, New York
- Nearest city: Alexandria Bay, New York
- Coordinates: 44°22′59″N 75°51′25″W
- Area: 61 acres (0.25 km^{2})
- Created: 1898
- Operator: New York State Office of Parks, Recreation and Historic Preservation
- Visitors: 54,550 (in 2014)
- Open: Seasonal
- Website: Kring Point State Park

Kring Point State Park is a 61-acre (0.25 km^{2}) state park located on the St. Lawrence River in the Town of Alexandria in Jefferson County, New York. The park is north of Alexandria Bay near the St. Lawrence County line and is connected to NY 12 by Kring Point Road.

The park was established in 1898, as part of the St. Lawrence Reservation.

Open from the last Friday in April through Columbus Day, the park offers a beach, a playground, picnic tables and pavilions, recreation programs, a nature trail, showers, fishing and hunting, a boat launch, a dump station, a campground for tents and trailers, cabins and cross-country skiing.

== See also ==
- List of New York state parks
