= Long Point State Park – Thousand Islands =

State park in Jefferson County, New York

Long Point State Park
- Location within New York
- Type: State park
- Location: 7495 State Park Road; Three Mile Bay, New York
- Coordinates: 44°01′34″N 76°13′15″W
- Area: 23 acres (0.093 km^{2})
- Created: 1913
- Operator: New York State Office of Parks, Recreation and Historic Preservation
- Visitors: 35,450 (in 2014)
- Open: Early May to Columbus Day
- Camp sites: 86
- Website: Long Point State Park

Long Point State Park – Thousand Islands is a 23-acre (0.093 km^{2}) state park located at the northeast tip of Point Peninsula on Lake Ontario's Chaumont Bay. The park is located in the Town of Lyme in Jefferson County, New York.

The park was established by New York State in 1913 as part of the St. Lawrence Reservation.

== Park description ==
Long Point State Park is open from early May to Columbus Day, and offers a playground, picnic tables and pavilions, showers, a boat launch, a campground with 86 sites for tents and trailers, and sheltered fishing in Chaumont Bay.

== See also ==
- List of New York state parks
