= Cedar Point State Park =

State park in Jefferson County, New York

- Location within New York
- Type: State park
- Location: 36661 Cedar Point State Park Drive, Clayton, New York
- Nearest city: Clayton
- Coordinates: 44°12′11″N 76°11′42″W
- Area: 48 acres (0.19 km^{2})
- Created: 1898
- Operator: New York State Office of Parks, Recreation and Historic Preservation
- Visitors: 72,601 (in 2014)
- Open: May through Columbus Day
- Website: Cedar Point State Park

Cedar Point State Park is a 48-acre (0.19 km^{2}) state park located on Cedar Point in the Town of Cape Vincent in Jefferson County, New York. The park is located on Route 12E on the St. Lawrence River.

The park was established in 1898 as part of the St. Lawrence Reservation.

== Facilities ==
Cedar Point State Park offers a beach, picnic tables and pavilions, a playground, a marina, fishing pier, hunting (seasonal waterfowl), recreation programs, a boat launch and docks, a campground with tent and trailer sites.

== See also ==
- List of New York state parks
