= Sodus Point Light =

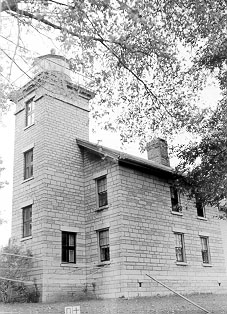
- Location: Off NY 14 at Sodus Bay, Lake Ontario, Sodus Point, New York
- Coordinates: 43°16′25.7″N 76°59′10.2″W

Tower
- Constructed: 1825; 201 years ago
- Foundation: Natural/emplaced
- Construction: Limestone
- Height: 45 feet (14 m)
- Shape: Square
- Markings: Natural w/ black lantern
- Heritage: National Register of Historic Places listed place

Light
- First lit: 1871
- Deactivated: 1901; 125 years ago
- Focal height: 70 feet (21 m)
- Lens: Sixth order Fresnel lens
- Sodus Point Lighthouse
- U.S. National Register of Historic Places
- Area: 1 acre (0.40 ha)
- Built: 1871
- NRHP reference No.: 76001288
- Added to NRHP: October 08, 1976

Sodus Point Light is a lighthouse that was built on Sodus Point on Lake Ontario, New York. The lighthouse has been replaced by a modern skeleton tower. The lighthouse tower is a square, pyramidal cast iron tower on a concrete and stone pier. It is white with red trim. There is a 2 1/2 story limestone keepers quarters that was built in 1871, which is currently used as a museum. The lighthouse is owned by the Village of Sodus Point, New York. There is a long-term lease with the Sodus Bay Historical Society to manage the lighthouse. The lighthouse is on the National Register of Historic Places, with reference #76001288, as Sodus Point Lighthouse. The pier and shore light served simultaneously from 1834 until 1901. The dwelling was used by the Coast Guard as housing until 1984. There is a 3 1/2 order Fresnel lens on display.

== Gallery ==
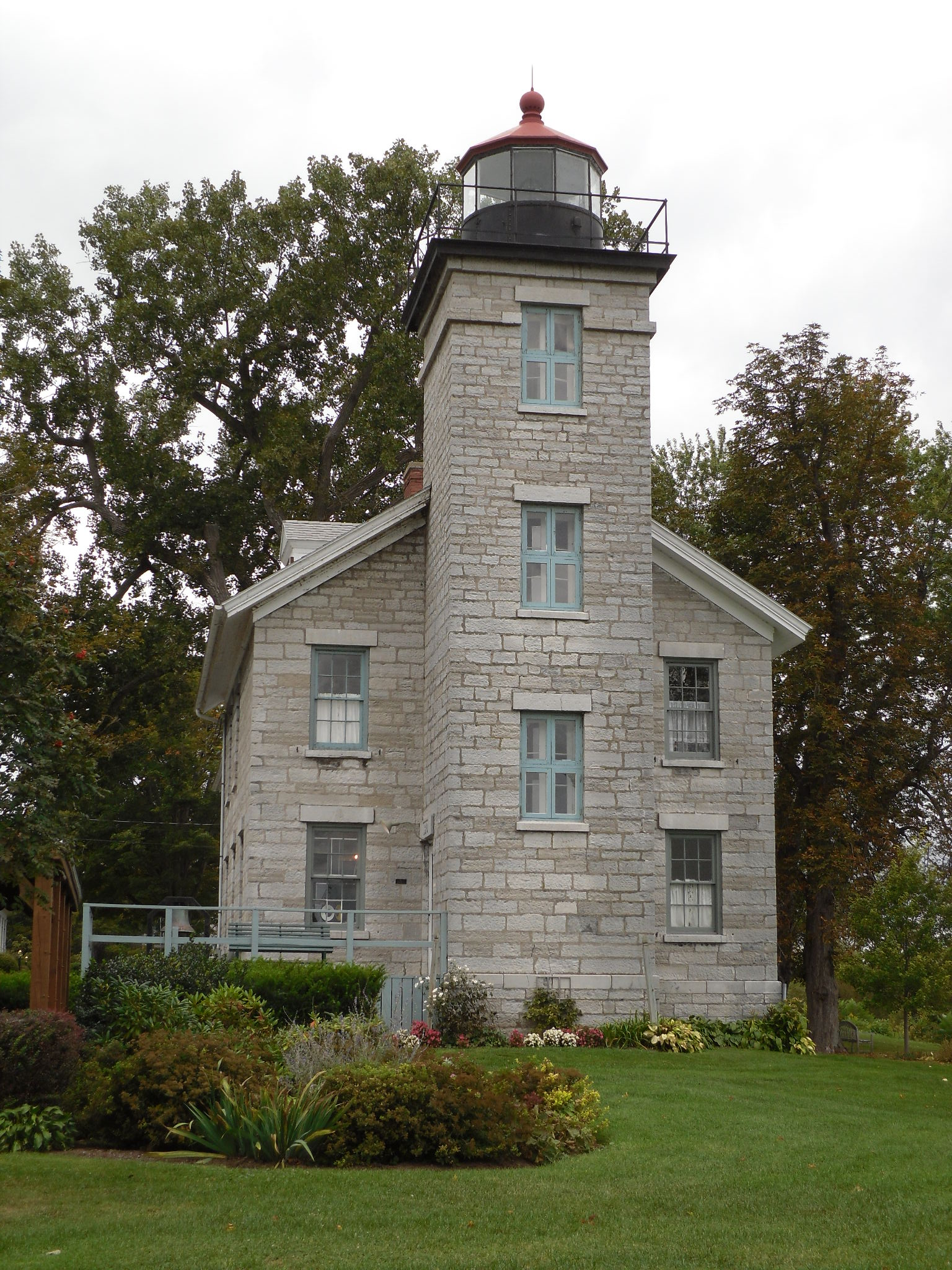
Sodus Point Light, September 2010
