= Abijah Hammond =

American artillery officer

Lt. Abijah Hammond Jr (February 22. 1757-December 30, 1832) was an American artillery officer in the Revolutionary War in the Continental line. After the war, he became a merchant and real estate investor active in various endeavors important to the development of New York.

== Early life ==
Hammond was born in Newton, Massachusetts in 1757. He was the oldest of seven children of Abijah Hammond Sr. and Mary Saltmarsh. His father, Abijah Hammond Sr. was a private in the American Revolutionary War.

== Revolutionary War ==
In 1776, Hammond was commissioned in the Continental Army as a 2nd Lt. at age 19 in the 3rd Continental Artillery Regiment commanded by Colonel John Crane under Captain Benjamin Frothingham. In the early part of the campaign of 1777, Mr. Hammond went with his company to the North, and was in Fort Stanwix, (afterwards Fort Schuyler,) during the time it was besieged by General Barry St. Ledger. In early 1780, he was promoted to 1st. Lt. He subsequently went with his regiment to Virginia. He was present at the Battle of Brandywine, the Battle of Germantown, the Battle of Monmouth and the Battle of Yorktown. At Monmouth, he was wounded, once by a sabre cut and again by a musket ball, and at Valley Forge endured the hardships of the Winter of 1777–78. He was attached to the Adjutant-General's Department under Colonel Alexander Scammell, toward the close of the war. In 1781, as his health was declining during the war, he petitioned and was permitted a leave of absence from General Washington. ‘ When the army, after the war, was reorganized, General Washington tendered him the command of an artillery regiment, which he declined.

== Society of the Cincinnati ==
He was an original member of the New York State Society of the Cincinnati, serving as its treasurer in 1793. It was from this organization, that he developed his friendship with Alexander Hamilton, later serving as a pallbearer at his funeral in 1804. He was succeeded by his son, Charles Henry Hammond, in the New York State Society of the Cincinnati

== Career, Politics, and Society ==
Hammond was a New York City merchant and a director of both the Bank of New York (later becoming BNY Melon) and the Society for Establishing Useful Manufactures. In addition to being a merchant, Hammond owned and developed large tracts of real estate in Manhattan (owning most of Greenwich) Long Island, and upstate New York. The town of Hammond, New York is named after him. Over his lifetime starting in 1793, eight hundred transactions were recorded, mostly in New York City and New York County locations. Typically, he bought and subdivided the land, selling parcels to individuals of all walks of life. In 1792, Hammond donated a device for drilling for water to the New York City government, which ordered experiments to begin on a vacant lot adjoining city hall. On November 7, 1796, the 20th New York State Legislature elected 12 presidential electors, all Federalists. One of the 12 was Abijah Hammond. Hammond and the others all cast their votes for John Adams and Thomas Pinckney. He was also an avid reader, especially of books relating to the ancient societies in and around the Mediterranean. Hammond was a commissioner at the first meeting of the New England Society of New York in 1805. Hammond was also a Freemason. In 1799, Hammond was the "second" for John Barker Church in the duel between Church and Aaron Burr. Church was the brother in law of Alexander Hamilton. Hamilton subsequently died in his duel with Burr in 1804. In the New York City "pig wars" of the 1810s, Hammond mobilized two hundred fellow merchants and property owners to sign a petition demanding the removal of all free-running pigs. Although this effort did not immediately sway the city council, the pigs and their owners were eventually driven out to New Jersey

== New York Manumission Society ==
In 1785, he joined the New York Manumission Society, an American organization founded in 1785 by John Jay, among others, to promote the gradual abolition of slavery and manumission of slaves of African descent within the state of New York. At the February 8, 1786 meeting, a committee was appointed consisting of Alexander Hamilton and Abijah Hammond to “endeavor to procure an Act of the Legislature to prevent the exportation of any Slaves from this State—”. In subsequent years, Hammond served on additional committees in the society and over the course of several years, divested himself of the domestic servant slaves he owned. Hammond also recognized the plight of the poor in describing their conditions as closely resembling slavery when he stated in 1820: "Most of the poor are sold, as the term is, that is, to those who agree to support them on the lowest terms, to purchasers nearly as poor as themselves who treat them in many instances more like brutes than like human beings, and who instead of applying, the amount they received from the poor master, for the comfort of the pauper, spend it to support their own families, or which is too often the case, in purchasing ardent spirits; under the maddening influence of which, they treat these wretched pensioners, and not infrequently their own wives and children, with violence and outrage."

== Tontine Coffee House ==
In 1793, Hammond became an original shareholder of the Tontine Coffee House. The Tontine was among New York City's busiest centers for the buying and selling of stocks and other securities after the Buttonwood Agreement had been signed the year prior. When the Tontine's trade proceedings had outgrown the venue, the New York Stock Exchange Board (NYSEB) was formed in 1817.

== Personal life ==
Hammond first married Hannah Fairservice on 29 March 1778. They had two children. After the death of Hannah, he married Catherine Ludlow Ogden, the daughter of Abraham Ogden and Sarah Frances Ludlow, brought forth ten children. After the death of Catherine in 1814, he married Margaret Aspinwall. Hammond died on December 30, 1832, at his mansion on Throggs Neck
