= Hammond, New York =

- Town
- Location within the state of New York
- Coordinates: 44°26′56″N 75°41′39″W
- Country: United States
- State: New York
- County: St. Lawrence

Area
  - Total: 78 sq mi (202 km^{2})
  - Land: 62 sq mi (161 km^{2})
  - Water: 16 sq mi (41 km^{2})
- Elevation: 358 ft (109 m)

Population (2020)
  - Total: 1,258
  - Density: 18.7/sq mi (7.23/km^{2})
- Time zone: UTC-5 (Eastern (EST))
  - Summer (DST): UTC-4 (EDT)
- Postal code: 13646
- FIPS code: 36-31841
- GNIS feature ID: 979040
- Website: https://townofhammondny.gov/

Hammond is a town in St. Lawrence County, New York, United States. The population was 1,191 at the 2010 census. The name is derived from early land owner Abijah Hammond.

The Town of Hammond is in the northwestern corner of St. Lawrence County. The Village of Hammond lies approximately centrally within the town.

== History ==
The Town of Hammond was formed in 1827 when portions of the Town of Morristown and the Town of Rossie were combined. Subsequent small alterations in the town lines affected the neighboring towns of Rossie, Macomb, and Morristown.

Alexander Macomb bought land in this area, and this was known as the Macomb purchase. Later this land was bought by Abijah Hammond, a New York businessman. He in turn sold 28,871 acres (116.84 km^{2}) of land to David Parish. A land office was opened in 1814 in Chippewa Bay, a sub-community of the Town of Hammond today.

By an act of the New York State Legislature, Hammond officially became a town on March 30, 1827. The town was named after Abijah Hammond. Hammond is older than Chicago and at one point was larger, but due to location Hammond lost its population.

The first resident of Hammond was in Chippewa Bay, named William McNeil. He was originally from Vermont. He lived in a cave which is no longer there; the spot is marked with a nearby plaque provided by the local R.T. Elethorp Historical Society. A statue was carved in his honor and is located in front of the Hammond Museum, north of the Village of Hammond on State Route 37. The cave was covered by construction crews when a road was built to the edge of the bay.

Population had increased by 240% by the year 1840. The first schoolhouse was built from 1819 to 1820, the first church in 1821, and the first post office in 1822. The log shanties with thatched roofs were replaced with frame and stone houses, many of which stand today. The stone houses built in the early 1800s were built by the first Scottish families immigrating to the Hammond area.

== Geography ==
The Village of Hammond is located at 44°26′56″N 75°41′39″W. The elevation is 358 feet (109 m).

According to the United States Census Bureau, the town has a total area of 77.9 sq mi (202 km^{2}), of which 62.2 sq mi (161 km^{2}) is land and 15.7 sq mi (41 km^{2}) (20.13%) is water.

The northern town line is the international border of Ontario, Canada, defined by the St. Lawrence River. The western town line is the border of Jefferson County.

New York State Route 37 is a north–south state highway which passes through the center of the Village of Hammond. New York State Route 12 follows the south bank of the St. Lawrence River through the Town and was built in the mid-1960s connecting Interstate 81 west of Alexandria Bay with NY-37 at Morristown.

The community is in the Eastern Standard time zone.

== Education ==
- Hammond Central School – A single story building, all encompassing, Pre-K through 12th grade public educational facility, located on Main Street in the Village of Hammond. There are approximately 300 students who attend. The average grade level has 21 students. HCS is known for their exceptional sports teams, despite their small size.

== Demographics ==
Historical population
Census	Pop.	Note	%±
1830	767		—
1840	1,845		140.5%
1850	1,819		−1.4%
1860	1,968		8.2%
1870	1,757		−10.7%
1880	1,860		5.9%
1890	1,774		−4.6%
1900	1,704		−3.9%
1910	1,745		2.4%
1920	1,507		−13.6%
1930	1,338		−11.2%
1940	1,260		−5.8%
1950	1,251		−0.7%
1960	1,076		−14.0%
1970	1,015		−5.7%
1980	1,090		7.4%
1990	1,168		7.2%
2000	1,207		3.3%
2010	1,191		−1.3%
2020	1,258		5.6%

As of the census of 2000, there were 1,207 people, 500 households, and 339 families residing in the town. The population density was 19.4 inhabitants per square mile (7.5/km^{2}). There were 1,371 housing units at an average density of 22.0 per square mile (8.5/km^{2}). The racial makeup of the town was 97.18% White, 0.50% Black or African American, 0.66% Native American, 0.17% Pacific Islander, 0.25% from other races, and 1.24% from two or more races. Hispanic or Latino of any race were 0.33% of the population.

There were 500 households, out of which 28.6% had children under the age of 18 living with them, 56.6% were married couples living together, 7.2% had a female householder with no husband present, and 32.2% were non-families. 27.2% of all households were made up of individuals, and 13.6% had someone living alone who was 65 years of age or older. The average household size was 2.41 and the average family size was 2.90.

In the town, the population was spread out, with 24.7% under the age of 18, 5.3% from 18 to 24, 26.8% from 25 to 44, 24.9% from 45 to 64, and 18.4% who were 65 years of age or older. The median age was 41 years. For every 100 females, there were 97.9 males. For every 100 females age 18 and over, there were 96.8 males.

The median income for a household in the town was $25,313, and the median income for a family was $30,114. Males had a median income of $24,135 versus $20,938 for females. The per capita income for the town was $14,998. About 15.3% of families and 19.0% of the population were below the poverty line, including 18.1% of those under age 18 and 19.5% of those age 65 or over.

== Economy ==
Within the town, many smaller localized communities have evolved. All had their own businesses/industries. The primary industry of the original Scottish settlers was sheep farming and supporting entities which evolved into today's modern dairy farming. As major roads permeated the area, a secondary travel and vacation industry sprang up which provided extensive vacation/recreational rental properties on both Black Lake and the St Lawrence River.

Business and industries included in the townships history have included, glass factories, asheries, tanneries, restaurants, gas stations, auto repair, two post offices, a lumber yard, a bowling alley, a bank, a library, a phone company, cottage rentals, boat/motor/general marine services, barber shops, antiques, saw mills, blacksmiths, a farm store, general stores, stone quarries, milk processing plants, cheese factories, coal storage cribs/coal sale and delivery etc.

A railroad spur line passed through the western side of the Village of Hammond and was in limited use until the early-mid-1960s. The original railroad depot is still standing in the same spot. Many of the original stone quarries are still identifiable. A stone quarry on Oak Island in Chippewa Bay supplied stone to build Boldt Castle. It even had its own railway to move cut stone to the boats used to transport the stone. A stone quarry that was once located in South Hammond on Route 37 supplied sandstone to make local roads. This quarry at one time employed approximately 600 men. The Town of Hammond Museum, formed by R.T. Elethorp Historical Society, saved an original quarry building from the South Hammond quarry and moved it to the current museum property.

The remnants of where many of the old forgotten business once stood can still be seen today.

The Village of Hammond also has a mason's lodge, a retirement home, several churches and a town museum (previously mentioned).

Hammond is a well-known speed trap raising revenue by catching speeders going to and from the Canadian border.

== Hamlets* and notable locations within the Town of Hammond ==
- Atlantis Island – An island in the St. Lawrence River near Chippewa Bay village.
- Black Lake – A small part of the southwestern end of the lake is inside the town at its eastern town line.
- Big Island – An island in the St. Lawrence River in the town of Hammond.
- Black Bay – A bay on Black Lake near the eastern town line.
- Blind Bay – A small hamlet off NY-12 just northeast of Chippewa Point on the St. Lawrence River. The hamlet contains a small bay, a store/marina, several homes and summer cottages.
- Cedar Island – An Island in Chippewa Bay on the St. Lawrence River.
- Cedar Island State Park – A state park located on Cedar Island in the St. Lawrence River.
- Chippewa Bay – A hamlet on the shore of Chippawa Bay, located on NY-12. Chippewa Bay contains many year round residents, summer homes and rental cottages. The Town of Hammond has a town dock/boat launch and parking facility there. A summer store/marina is located there also and is next to the parking area that is reserved for campers using the Cedar Island State Park facilities. One of the two post offices in the township is also located there.
- Chippewa Creek – A stream near the northeastern end of Chippewa Bay, adjacent to Little Hammond, which drains part of the township into the bay.
- Chippewa Point – A point of land defining the northernmost end of Chippewa Bay. It is defined (technically) as a "Cape" and a "Locale" by the US Geological Society.
- Crooked Creek – A stream near the southwestern end of Chippewa Bay near Schermerhorn Landing, which drains part of the township into the bay.
- Crossover Island – A St. Lawrence River island in the northern part of the town containing the landmark "Crossover Is Lighthouse".
- Dark Island A St. Lawrence River island in the Chippewa Bay area. The castle on the island is now a tourist attraction known as Singer Castle originally built in 1905 by Frederick Gilbert Bourne, the fifth president of the Singer Sewing Machine Company.
- Eric Corner – A location south of Chippewa Bay, located on County Road 6.
- Hammond – The Village of Hammond is located in the center of the Town of Hammond on NY-37 at its junction with County Road 6.
- Hemlock Island – An island in the St. Lawrence River by the northwestern corner of the town.
- Little Hammond – a small hamlet of mostly summer homes on the northeastern end of Chippewa Bay, adjacent to Chippewa Point and Blind Bay.
- Mink Island – An island located between Oak Island and the mainland near Schermerhorn Landing. A unique community of 13 cottages.
- North Hammond – A hamlet north of the Village of Hammond on County Road 3.
- Oak Island – An island in the St. Lawrence River near Schermerhorn Landing.
- Oak Point – A hamlet on NY-12 along the south shore of the St. Lawrence River. The community is located on a land projection into the river which also contains a small bay and several small islands. The hamlet contains both permanent residents, summer homes and vacation rentals. The Town of Hammond has a town dock/boat launch facility there.
- Oakvale – A hamlet southeast of South Hammond, south of NY-37.
- Schermerhorn Landing – A hamlet on Chippewa Bay, southwest of Chippewa Bay village on NY-12.
- Sister Island Lighthouse – A St Lawrence Seaway lighthouse which is located near Schermerhorn Landing which is only visible by water and is upstream from Dark Island.
- South Hammond – A small hamlet of residences is located southwest of the Village of Hammond on NY-37.
- Saint Lawrence Seaway – The St. Lawrence Seaway operated by the US Government, Dept. of the Interior passes through the American side of the St. Lawrence River in the Town of Hammond.
- A "Hamlet" is technically defined as a "Populated Place" by the US Geological Survey.
