= Grindstone Island =

Island in the St. Lawrence River, North America

- Location within New York

Geography
- Location: St. Lawrence River
- Coordinates: 44°16′37″N 76°06′53″W
- Length: 5 mi (8 km)
- Width: 3 mi (5 km)
- Highest elevation: 285 ft (86.9 m)

Administration
- United States
- State: New York
- County: Jefferson
- Town: Clayton

Grindstone Island is the fourth largest of the Thousand Islands in the St. Lawrence River and the second largest of the American islands in the St. Lawrence. The island lies near Lake Ontario and is part of the United States. In particular, the island is part of the Town of Clayton in Jefferson County, New York.

The island contains Potters Beach, a private vineyard, summer gift shops, four active beef farms, historic but now abandoned farmlands, and private non-government conservation lands owned by the Thousand Island Land Trust (TILT). New York State's last operating one-room school was on the island and closed in 1989. The current number of year-round households on the island is ten, however the population climbs to 700 people during the summer months.

== History ==
The first known settlement occurred in 1804. The island was once considered to be part of Canada but, since 1823, has been recognized as part of the United States. Shortly afterwards a dispute over some harvested trees created a brief disturbance called "The Grindstone Island War" in which American militia attempted to prevent the removal of the logs. In 1831 the entire island was purchased by Eliza Evertson, the widow of Nicholas Evertson and the grandmother of Edgar Saltus, for $15,000. The Evertson family owned the island for over 40 years.

In the early 1900s the island acquired enough of a population to have two school buildings built, a lower school house (which is now a private home) by the cross-island bridge and an upper school house, which is now the Grindstone Island Research and Heritage Center which gives out scholarships once a year. The island also has a Methodist church founded in 1899 (with services on Sundays) with a Community Center (Dodge Hall) across the street (with dances on Saturday nights in the summer) and a no longer functioning Creamery and Cheese Factory. The island also has one of the few natural beaches in the Thousand Island region open to the public, Potter's Beach.

Lumber and granite quarries were important in the early economy. The island is a self-sustaining environment that operates on an honor system; however, infrastructure such as electricity is provided by National Grid US. There are no bridges onto Grindstone (save when the river freezes), or formal ferry services onto Grindstone Island. There is a community dock (the town dock in Aunt Jane's Bay) provided for visitors on Aunt Jane's Bay - some inlanders who live inland on the island park their vehicles along the road. There is a normal US postal service delivery route onto the island Monday through Saturday.

The island also recently received street signs marking the island's few official unpaved roads. The people who live on this island are known to locals as "Islanders".

The Grindstone Island Upper Schoolhouse was added to the National Register of Historic Places in 2012.

== Geography ==
Grindstone Island is the fourth largest of the islands in the Thousand Islands region, measuring about 5 miles (8.0 km) long and 3 miles (4.8 km) wide at its widest point. The northern part of the island is near the Canada–United States border. The island is in the western part of the St. Lawrence river valley, and is located between Wellesley Island (New York, United States) and Wolfe Island (Ontario, Canada), about 1.27 miles (2.04 km) from Clayton on the New York mainland.

=== Thousand Island Land Trust holdings ===
Thirty-nine percent of the island is currently owned by the Thousand Island Land Trust (TILT). Their 885 acres (358 ha) of private conservation lands are currently spread over different parts of the island. TILT currently owns Potter's Beach (20 acres [8.1 ha] - the largest naturally occurring sand beach on the American side of the Thousand Islands), Potter's Forest Preserve (200 acres [81 ha]), Mid River Farm Preserve (165 acres [67 ha]), Douglas Howard-Smith Preserve (130 acres [53 ha]), Rusho Farm Preserve (140 acres [57 ha]), Delaney Farm Preserve (80 acres [32 ha]), Heineman Forest Preserve (100 acres [40 ha]) and Grindstone Nature Trail (50 acres [20 ha]). TILT acts as a steward of another 900 acres (360 ha) of wetlands, forest and grasslands on privately held property through conservation easements.

== Communities and locations on Grindstone Island ==
- Aunt Janes Bay — A bay on the south shore
- Canoe-Picnic Point State Park — A state park on the northeast tip of the island is currently only accessible by canoe or other small watercraft
- "The cheese factory" — A once-active factory from when dairy farmers were abundant on the island. It was shut down when the farmers ceased producing milk.
- Cummings Point — The tip of a short peninsula of the island on the southwest end
- Murdoch Point — The tip of a short peninsula of the island on the southwest end, northeast of Cummings Point
- Delaney Bay — A bay at the northeast part of the island.
- Dodge Hall — A community center on Northshore Road
- Flynn Bay — A bay on the southwest end of the island
- Grindstone — A hamlet on the north shore
- Grindstone United Methodist Church — A church founded in 1890
- Lower Town Landing — A hamlet on the south shore
- Rusho Bay — A bay on the south shore of the island
- Thurso — A small community reaching from Thurso Bay to the crossroads at the church
- Upper Town Landing — A hamlet on the south shore
- Grindstone Island Thurso Cemetery — Town-owned Cemetery on Northshore Road
