= Burnham Point State Park =

State park in Jefferson County, New York

- Location within New York
- Type: State park
- Location: 340765 NYS Route 12E; Cape Vincent, New York
- Nearest city: Cape Vincent, New York
- Coordinates: 44°09′43″N 76°15′50″W
- Area: 12 acres (0.049 km^{2})
- Created: 1898
- Operator: New York State Office of Parks, Recreation and Historic Preservation
- Visitors: 14,053 (in 2020)
- Open: Mid-May to Labor Day
- Camp sites: 47
- Website: Burnham Point State Park

Burnham Point State Park is a 12-acre (0.049 km^{2}) state park located on the St. Lawrence River in the Town of Cape Vincent in Jefferson County, New York, United States. The park is approximately 32 miles (51 km) north of Watertown.

The park was established in 1898 as part of the St. Lawrence Reservation.

The park is 1 of 80 New York State Parks that are in the path of totality for the 2024 solar eclipse, with the park experiencing 3 minutes and 23 seconds of totality.

== Park description ==
Burnham Point State Park is open from mid-May through Labor Day. The small park primarily offers space to camp, including 47 tent and trailer sites, 19 of which contain electrical hookups. The park also offers a boat launch, boat slips, fishing, hunting, pavilions, picnic tables, and a playground.

== See also ==
- List of New York state parks
