= Sodus Point, New York =

- Village
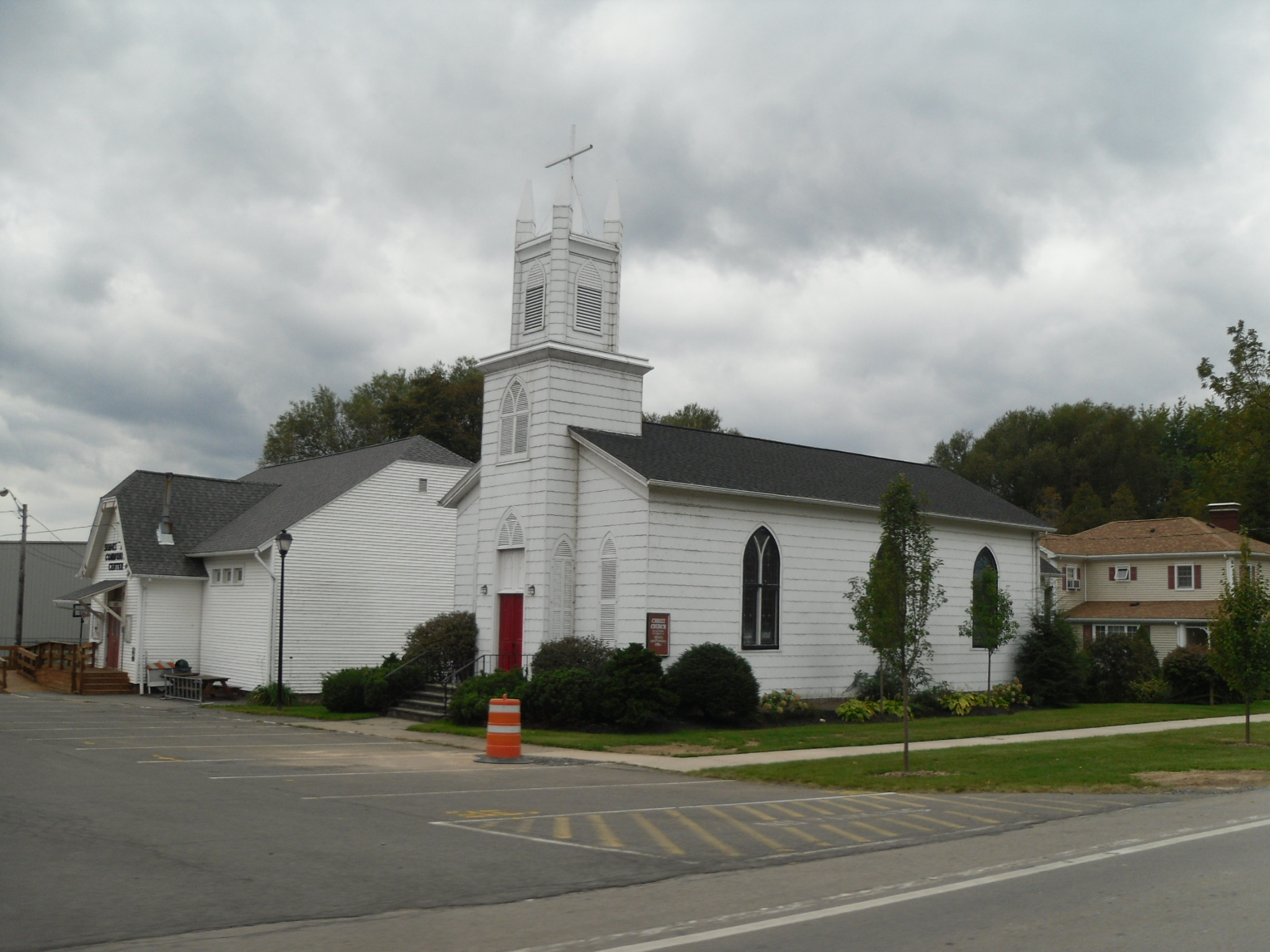
- Church in Sodus Point, New York

- Location in Wayne County and the state of New York.

- Location within the state of New York
- Coordinates: 43°16′10″N 76°59′15″W
- Country: United States
- State: New York
- County: Wayne
- Town: Sodus
- Settled: 1794; 232 years ago
- Incorporated: December 30, 1957; 68 years ago
- Named after: "Assorodus," the Cayuga language work for "silvery water"

Government
  - Type: Board of Trustees
  - Mayor: Dave McDowell
  - Clerk: Tracy B. Durham

Area
  - Total: 1.47 sq mi (3.81 km^{2})
  - Land: 1.47 sq mi (3.80 km^{2})
  - Water: 0.0077 sq mi (0.02 km^{2})
- Elevation: 276 ft (84 m)

Population (2020)
  - Total: 822
  - Density: 560.8/sq mi (216.52/km^{2})
- Time zone: UTC-5 (Eastern (EST))
  - Summer (DST): UTC-4 (EDT)
- ZIP code: 14555
- Area codes: 315 and 680
- FIPS code: 36-68242
- GNIS feature ID: 0965624
- Website: http://www.soduspoint.info/

Sodus Point is a village in Wayne County, New York, United States. The population was 900 at the 2010 census. However, the last official US Census in 2020 recorded the population at 822. The name is derived from a nearby body of water, Sodus Bay. It is considered to be within the larger Rochester metropolitan area.

The Village of Sodus Point is in the northeastern part of the Town of Sodus. This is a lakeside community surrounded on three sides by water.

== History ==
In 1794, the village was the site of the first European-American settlement in Sodus town. Before the American Revolution, the area for centuries was the territory of the Onondaga Nation.

During the War of 1812, the village was burned by a British raiding party, leaving all but one building demolished. The village was rebuilt.

The area became an important port on Lake Ontario in the 19th Century. As the Erie Canal shifted state transportation patterns, the village's function as a port declined. In the later 19th century, it became a popular vacation resort, especially for people from Chicago and other cities during the summers.

Sodus Point was incorporated in 1957.

The schooner Lotus, Customs House, and Sodus Point Light are listed on the National Register of Historic Places. Writer Elizabeth F. Ellet was a native of the town.

== Geography ==
Sodus Point is located at 43°16′10″N 76°59′15″W (43.269332, -76.987608).

According to the United States Census Bureau, the village has a total area of 1.5 square miles (3.9 km^{2}), of which 1.5 square miles (3.9 km^{2}) is land and 0.67% is water.

The village is on the shore of Lake Ontario on a point of land on the northwest edge of Sodus Bay, an arm of Lake Ontario. The name "Sodus" reportedly is derived from a native word meaning "gleam on the water." Another possible origin is the Iroquois "Land of Silver Waters."

County Road 101 (Lake Road/Lake Avenue) leads into the village from the west. New York State Route 14 has its northern terminus at the village.

== Demographics ==
Historical population
Census	Pop.	Note	%±
1960	868		—
1970	1,172		35.0%
1980	1,334		13.8%
1990	1,190		−10.8%
2000	1,160		−2.5%
2010	900		−22.4%
2020	822		−8.7%
U.S. Decennial Census

=== 2010 U.S. Federal Census ===
As of the census of 2010, there were 900 people, 425 households, and 258 families living in the village. The population density was 600 people per square mile (230 people/km^{2}). The racial makeup of the village was 93% White, 3% Black or African American, 0.3% Asian, 0.1% Pacific Islander, 1% from other races, and 2.6% from two or more races. Hispanic or Latino of any race were 3.3% of the population.

There were 425 households, out of which 19.1% had children under the age of 18 living with them, 48.7% were married couples living together, 8% had a female householder with no husband present, and 39.3% were non-families. 31.5% of all households were made up of individuals, and 9.4% had someone living alone who was 65 years of age or older. The average household size was 2.12 and the average family size was 2.59.

In the village, the population was spread out, with 15.2% under the age of 18, 65.2% from 18 to 64, and 19.6% who were 65 years of age or older. The median age was 52 years.

The median income for a household in the village was $59,583, and the median income for a family was $61,000. Males had a median income of $40,605 versus $31,435 for females. The per capita income for the village was $30,199. About 6.8% of families and 8.2% of the population were below the poverty line, including 22% of those under age 18 and 1.6% of those age 65 or over.

=== 2000 U.S. Federal Census ===
As of the census of 2000, there were 1,160 people, 491 households, and 327 families living in the village. The population density was 778.5 people per square mile (300.6 people/km^{2}). There were 886 housing units at an average density of 594.6 per square mile (229.6/km^{2}). The racial makeup of the village was 95.95% White, 1.55% Black or African American, 0.17% Asian, 0.17% from other races, and 2.16% from two or more races. Hispanic or Latino of any race were 1.55% of the population.

There were 491 households, out of which 28.1% had children under the age of 18 living with them, 51.1% were married couples living together, 9.2% had a female householder with no husband present, and 33.4% were non-families. 27.3% of all households were made up of individuals, and 9.8% had someone living alone who was 65 years of age or older. The average household size was 2.36 and the average family size was 2.83.

In the village, the population was spread out, with 25.0% under the age of 18, 5.3% from 18 to 24, 25.8% from 25 to 44, 30.8% from 45 to 64, and 13.1% who were 65 years of age or older. The median age was 42 years. For every 100 females, there were 108.3 males. For every 100 females age 18 and over, there were 101.4 males.

The median income for a household in the village was $39,914, and the median income for a family was $44,600. Males had a median income of $38,667 versus $25,521 for females. The per capita income for the village was $22,642. About 8.2% of families and 13.8% of the population were below the poverty line, including 24.5% of those under age 18 and 10.8% of those age 65 or over.

=== Housing (2010 U.S. Federal Census) ===
There were 754 housing units at an average density of 502.6 per square mile (194.1/km^{2}); a total of 43.6% of housing units were vacant.

There were 425 occupied housing units in the village, of which 325 were owner-occupied units (76.5%), while 100 were renter-occupied (23.5%). The homeowner vacancy rate was 3.5% of total units. The rental unit vacancy rate was 34.0%.

NOTE: It is common for resort communities to have higher than normal vacant house counts. Many are vacation homes which are seasonal and not regularly occupied.
