= New York State Route 12E =

New York state highway

New York State Route 12E
- Map of Jefferson County and vicinity with NY 12E highlighted in red

Route information
- Auxiliary route of NY 12
- Maintained by NYSDOT, Jefferson County and the city of Watertown
- Length: 36.08 mi (58.07 km)
- Existed: 1930–present
- Tourist routes: Great Lakes Seaway Trail

Major junctions
- South end: NY 12F in Brownville
- North end: NY 12 in Clayton

Location
- Country: United States
- State: New York
- Counties: Jefferson

Highway system
- New York Highways; Interstate; US; State; Reference; Parkways
← NY 12D	→ NY 12F

New York State Route 12E (NY 12E) is a state highway located entirely within the northwestern part of Jefferson County in northern New York in the United States. The southern terminus is at NY 12F in the village of Brownville. Its northern terminus, both signed and official, is at NY 12 in the village of Clayton. While NY 12 follows a direct north–south routing between Watertown and Clayton, NY 12E diverges westward to follow the shoreline of Lake Ontario. The portion of NY 12E north of its junction with NY 180 is part of the Seaway Trail, a National Scenic Byway.

Most of modern NY 12E was originally designated as part of NY 3 in 1924. NY 3 was moved onto its current alignment east of Watertown as part of the 1930 renumbering of state highways in New York, at which time its former routing between Watertown and Clayton became NY 12E. From Watertown to Limerick, what is now NY 12E was originally NY 12F. The alignments of the two routes were flipped in the late 1930s. In 1980, Jefferson County assumed maintenance of NY 12E between the Watertown city line and Brownville as part of a highway maintenance swap between the county and the state. This section is now county-maintained as County Route 190 (CR 190).

== Route description ==
=== Watertown and Brownville ===
NY 12E begins at the intersection of West Main and Bradley (NY 12) streets in the city of Watertown. It initially proceeds northwest on West Main Street as a four-lane residential and commercial street; however, it becomes a two-lane divided highway at a CSX Transportation railroad overpass just six blocks from NY 12. Past the crossing, the road follows the Black River across the city line and into the town of Pamelia, where it becomes co-designated as CR 190. The highway soon passes under Interstate 81 and narrows to a two-lane undivided road before turning westward into the riverside village of Glen Park. It retains its Main Street name through the community, following a two-lane residential street through the village center and eventually into the adjacent village of Brownville.

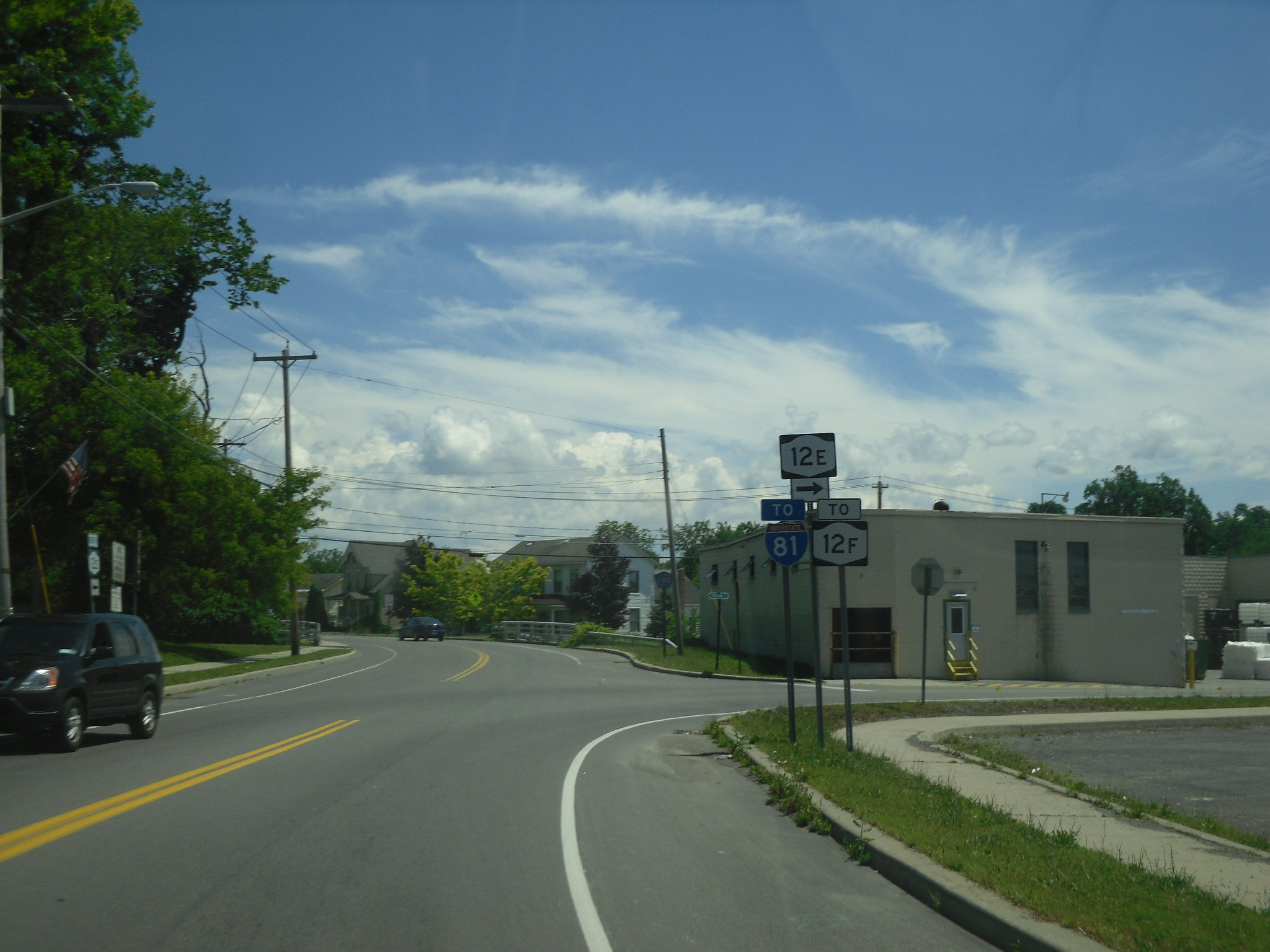
NY 12E at Bridge Street in Brownville. While signage indicates that NY 12E turns here, it officially continues straight onto CR 190.

In Brownville, the route intersects with the northern terminus of Bridge Street (unsigned NY 971H), a short north–south connector leading to NY 12F on the south bank of the Black River. At this point, the CR 190 co-designation ends and maintenance of the route becomes the responsibility of the state. Through Brownville, NY 12E remains a two-lane residential and commercial street, intersecting with the southern terminus of CR 54 (Brown Boulevard) near the Brownville Hotel, a National Register of Historic Places-listed (NRHP) property. At the western edge of the village, NY 12E passes Brownville Cemetery before leaving for the surrounding town of Brownville and losing the Main Street name. The highway parallels a former railroad right-of-way as it heads through the town of Brownville, becoming a two-lane rural highway and gradually bending northeastward away from the riverbank.

About 2 miles (3.2 km) from the center of Brownville, NY 12E intersects with CR 53 (Cemetery Road), an east–west highway linking the state route to the nearby village of Dexter. NY 12E continues on, passing just east of Dexter Cemetery and traversing an undeveloped rural area to reach the hamlet of Limerick. Within the community, it serves mostly residential areas and remains two lanes wide. In the center of the hamlet, the highway intersects with NY 180, a road leading to Dexter in the south and the Thousand Islands region in the north. Also present at the junction is the Seaway Trail, a National Scenic Byway that enters from the south on NY 180 and exits to the west on NY 12E. NY 12E leaves Limerick after this junction and continues through the town of Brownville, bending slightly to the northeast at a junction with CR 59 (North Shore Road) 3 miles (4.8 km) from Limerick at the Brownville–Lyme town line.

=== Lyme and Cape Vincent ===
After this junction, NY 12E crosses Guffin Creek on its way into the village of Chaumont. Here, NY 12E becomes Main Street again as it transitions from a rural highway back to a residential street. In the southern part of Chaumont, the route connects to CR 125, at which point NY 12E begins to pass by a mix of commercial and residential properties. It crosses over a small creek leading away from Chaumont Bay before turning slightly westward and entering the Chaumont Historic District. Just past the district, the route intersects with CR 179 (Evans Street), formerly part of NY 179. After this junction, NY 12E crosses over the Chaumont River and leaves the village limits at a junction with CR 8 (Johnny Cake Road).

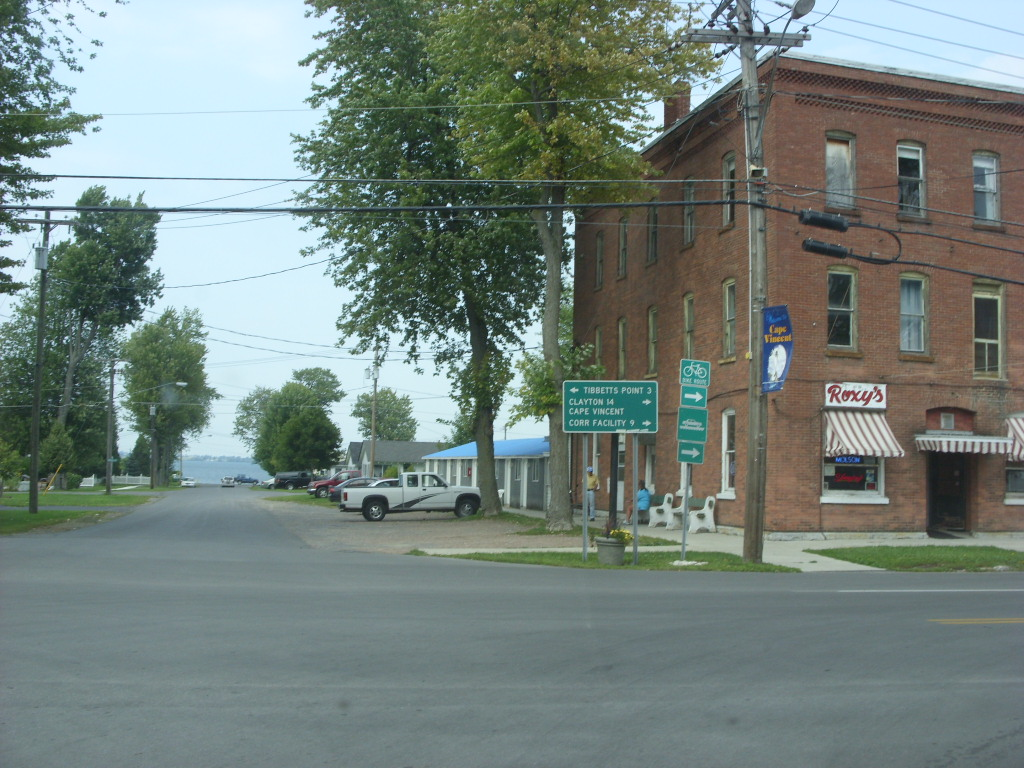
NY 12E at Broadway in the village of Cape Vincent

Through the surrounding town of Lyme, NY 12E reverts to a two-lane rural highway as it proceeds west into the hamlet of Herrick Grove, located 3 miles (4.8 km) from Chaumont. Here, the highway heads along a short commercial strip and intersects with the southern terminus of CR 5 (Depot and Church streets) off the shore of Chaumont Bay. After leaving Herrick Grove, NY 12E enters the nearby hamlet of Three Mile Bay, which comprises a few homes and a junction with CR 57 (Carrying Road). Past Three Mile Bay, the route makes a gradual bend to the northwest, leaving Lyme for the town of Cape Vincent, where NY 12E intersects with Bedford Corners Road (former CR 56) roughly 1 mile (1.6 km) from the town line. Heading northwest through the rural town, the route crosses over Kents Creek and intersects with CR 4 on its way into the village of Cape Vincent, located at the point where Lake Ontario meets the St. Lawrence River.

Inside the village limits, NY 12E becomes known as Market Street. It heads north as a two-lane residential street, passing the NRHP-listed John Borland House on its way to the south bank of the St. Lawrence River. Here, it intersects with Broadway, an east–west village street connecting to CR 6 west of the village. NY 12E turns northeastward on Broadway, passing through the Broadway Historic District and serving the NRHP-listed Vincent LeRay House. Two blocks from Market Street, NY 12E intersects with James Street, which leads to Wolfe Island via Horne's Ferry. At its north end, the ferry connects to what was once Highway 95 in Ontario, Canada. Past James Street, NY 12E follows Broadway through a commercial area that continues to the eastern village limits.

=== St. Lawrence River corridor ===
Outside of the village of Cape Vincent, NY 12E loses the Broadway moniker, passing St. Vincent of Paul Cemetery and a mobile home park as it runs northeastward along the St. Lawrence River. About 3 miles (4.8 km) from the village, the route passes an intersection with Carleton Drive, which serves a ferry linking Carleton Island to the river's south bank. After Carleton Drive, the route continues northeast through the town of Cape Vincent, passing another mobile home park and Burnham Point State Park. The route continues on, entering the adjacent hamlets of Sunnybank and Millins Bay. In the latter, NY 12E intersects with CR 7, a riverside highway serving a small community located between the river and NY 12E.

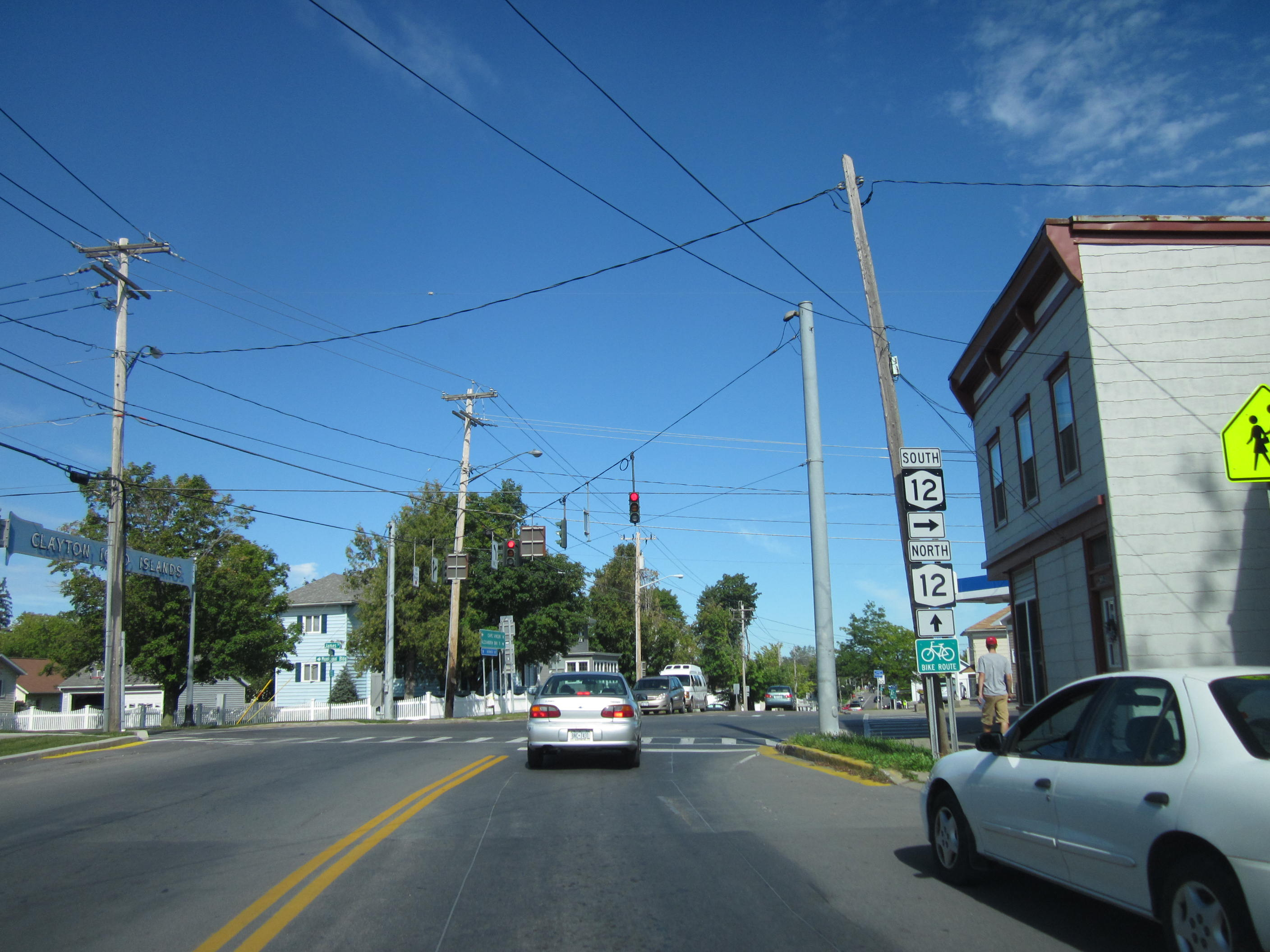
NY 12E at NY 12, its northern terminus, in Clayton

At the northern end of Millins Bay, CR 7 merges back into NY 12E, and the latter highway continues along the St. Lawrence River through the northern reaches of the town. Not far from the eastern town line, the route intersects with CR 9 (Sand Bay Road) and passes the Cape Vincent Correctional Facility and Cedar Point State Park, located on opposite sides of the highway. After the correctional facility, NY 12E crosses into the town of Clayton, where the route remains a two-lane rural riverside highway. Roughly 2 miles (3.2 km) into the town, the route bends slightly to the east and intersects with the northern terminus of CR 4 (Fish Pond Road), which intersected NY 12E back in the town of Cape Vincent.

Past the junction with CR 4, NY 12E bends back to the northeast, passing more riverside residences and a handful of farms before entering the village of Clayton. In the village, NY 12E becomes known as State Street as it crosses over an inlet from the St. Lawrence River. The bridge over the waterway brings the route into Clayton's downtown portion, where it intersects with NY 12 (James Street). This intersection serves as the northern terminus of NY 12E, as State Street continues northeastward as part of NY 12.

== History ==
In 1924, NY 3 was assigned to the New York portion of the Theodore Roosevelt International Highway, an auto trail that extended from Portland, Maine, to Portland, Oregon. In New York, it connected North Tonawanda (near Niagara Falls) in the west to Plattsburgh in the east via Rochester and Watertown. In Jefferson County, the trail and NY 3 entered Watertown on modern U.S. Route 11 and exited on what is now NY 12F. At Dexter, NY 3 turned north to follow current NY 180 and NY 12E to Clayton, where it continued eastward on modern NY 12.

In the 1930 renumbering of state highways in New York, NY 3 was rerouted to exit Watertown to the east on its modern alignment. The former alignment of NY 3 from Watertown to Clayton was redesignated as NY 12E. At the same time, an alternate route of NY 12E extending from the modern junction of NY 12E and NY 180 to downtown Watertown along the northern bank of the Black River was designated as NY 12F. The alignments of NY 12E and NY 12F east of what is now NY 180 were swapped c. 1939, placing both routes on their current alignments.

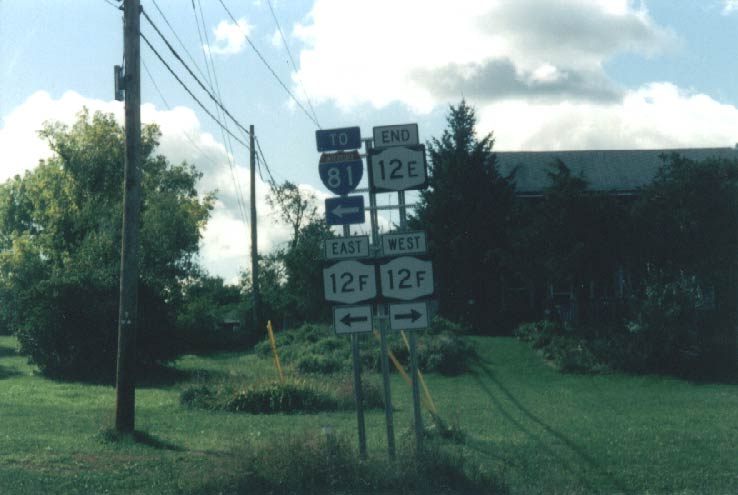
The signed southern terminus of NY 12E at the junction of NY 12F and Bridge Street in Brownville

On August 1, 1979, maintenance of NY 12E between Bridge Street in Brownville and the Watertown city line was transferred from the state of New York to Jefferson County as part of a larger highway maintenance swap between the two levels of government. In return, the state assumed maintenance of Bridge Street in Brownville and the town of Hounsfield, among other highways. Following the swap, the segment of NY 12E between Bridge Street and the Watertown city limits became concurrent with CR 190 while Bridge Street became NY 971H, an unsigned reference route. The section of NY 12E within the city of Watertown was locally maintained.

NY 12E was re-aligned between 2008 and 2012 to follow Bridge Street in Brownville to an intersection with NY 12F.

== Major intersections ==
The entire route is in Jefferson County.

Location	mi	km	Destinations	Notes
Village of Brownville	0.00	0.00	NY 12F	Southern terminus
Town of Brownville	4.10	6.60	NY 180 / Great Lakes Seaway Trail – Dexter, Gunns Corners	Hamlet of Limerick
Chaumont	9.43	15.18	CR 179 (Evans Street) – Depauville	Former southern terminus of NY 179
Village of Cape Vincent			James Street	Serves Wolfe Island (former Highway 95) via ferry
Village of Clayton	36.08	58.07	NY 12 (State Street / James Street) / Great Lakes Seaway Trail – Alexandria Bay	Northern terminus
Village of Clayton	36.08	58.07	James Street ( NY 970L) – Clayton Business District	Terminus of unsigned NY 970L
1.000 mi = 1.609 km; 1.000 km = 0.621 mi

== See also ==
- List of county routes in Jefferson County, New York
