= New York State Route 180 =

State highway in Jefferson County, New York, US

New York State Route 180
- Map of Jefferson County in northern New York with NY 180 highlighted in red

Route information
- Maintained by NYSDOT
- Length: 24.50 mi (39.43 km)
- Existed: 1930–present
- Tourist routes: Great Lakes Seaway Trail

Major junctions
- South end: NY 3 in Hounsfield
- North end: NY 12 in Orleans

Location
- Country: United States
- State: New York
- Counties: Jefferson

Highway system
- New York Highways; Interstate; US; State; Reference; Parkways
← NY 179	→ NY 182

New York State Route 180 (NY 180) is a north–south state highway in the northwestern part of Jefferson County in the U.S. state of New York. The southern terminus of the route is at NY 3 in the Hounsfield hamlet of Baggs Corner, located 7 miles (11 km) west of downtown Watertown. The northern terminus is at NY 12 in the Orleans hamlet of Fishers Landing. NY 180 is part of the Seaway Trail from its southern terminus at Baggs Corner to its junction with NY 12E at the Brownville hamlet of Limerick.

== Route description ==
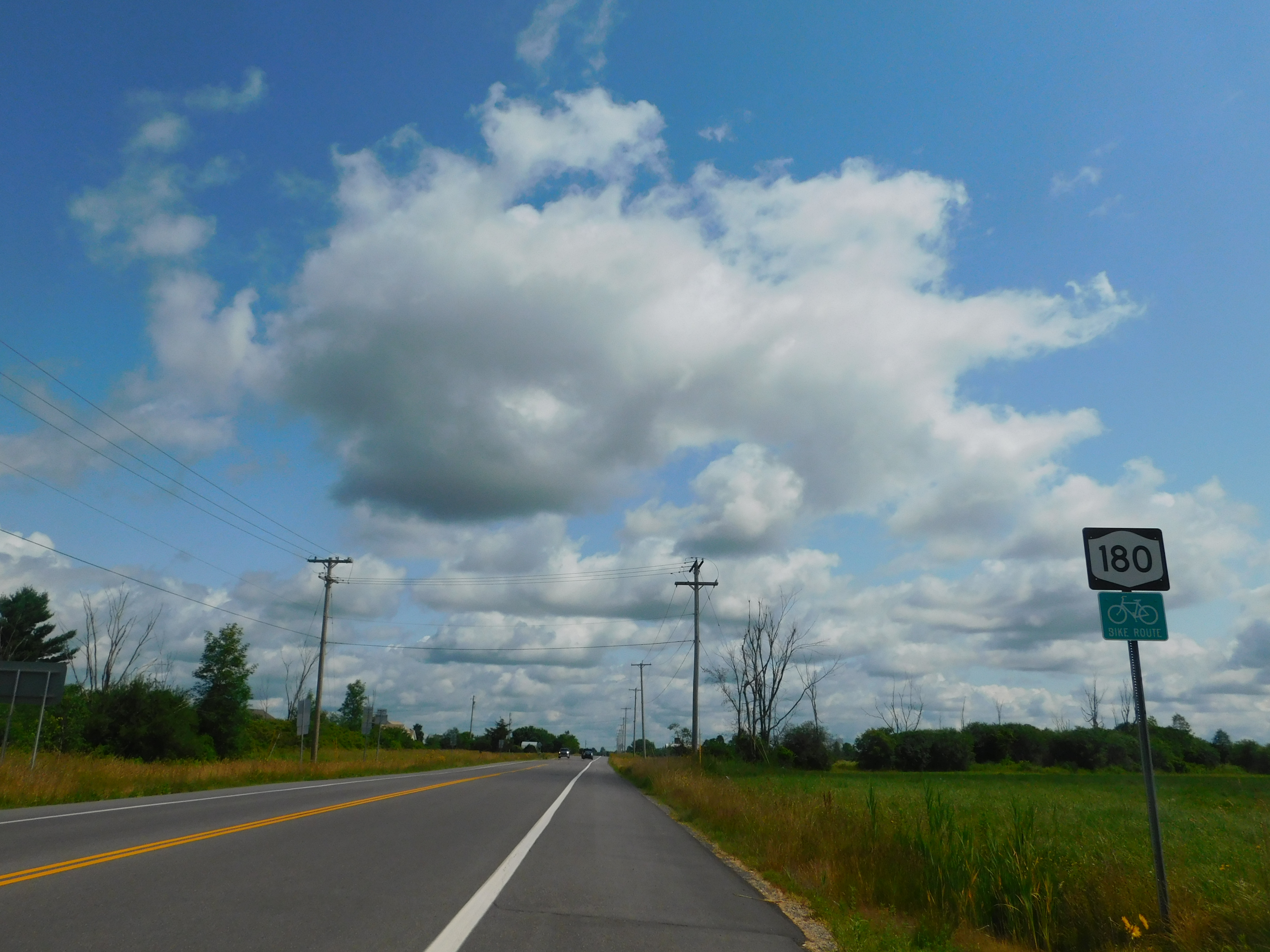
NY 180 northbound in Hounsfield

NY 180 begins at an intersection with NY 3 in the Hounsfield hamlet of Baggs Corner. A state-maintained continuation of County Route 66 (CR 66), NY 180 runs northeast through the wide fields of Hounsfield, passing east of the Black River Bay, and after bending north, the route passes west of Watertown International Airport. NY 180 soon meets at a junction with NY 12F, which runs east past the entrance of the airport. Crossing over the Black River, the route enters the village of Dexter. Now known as Brown Street, NY 180 runs north through the center of the village, reaching a junction with Grove Street, marking the northern edge of the village.

Continuing north, NY 180 enters the town of Brownville, crossing through the rural town as a two-lane road. The route makes a bend to the northeast and enters the hamlet of Limerick, where it crosses a junction with NY 12E. Now paralleling the Perch River, NY 180 runs northeast through the fields, reaching a junction with CR 54 (Depauville Road). After CR 54, NY 180 bends northward, bypassing the hamlet of Perch River, where the namesake waterway merges into Perch Lake. NY 180 bends northeast again, crossing a junction with CR 128 and entering the town of Clayton.

Now in Clayton, NY 180 crosses northeast into a junction with NY 12. The stretch through Clayton is short and rural, before the route crosses into the town of Orleans. A distance into Orleans, the route enters the hamlet of Stone Mills, a residential community in which NY 180 serves as the main thoroughfare. North of Stone Mills, the route bends to the north, remaining a two-lane rural road through Orleans. NY 180 soon bends to the northwest, reaching a junction with the terminus of CR 12. The route soon bends northeast again, passing Grove Cemetery as it enters the hamlet of La Fargeville. Paralleling the Chaumont River, NY 180 enters La Fargeville as the two-lane Main Street.

Crossing the Chaumont River, NY 180 reaches a junction with Sunrise Avenue, where it turns west while the right-of-way becomes NY 411. NY 180 goes west on Clayton Street for one block, turning north onto another road while Clayton becomes CR 181. Continuing northwest through the town of Orleans, NY 180 passes some residences in the rural town, eventually bending northward to a junction with CR 3 (East Line Road). Just north of CR 3, the route passes La Golf Club. North of the golf course, NY 180 turns northeast, reaching the hamlet of Omar. In Omar, NY 180 reaches the western terminus of CR 13, which runs parallel to I-81 nearby.

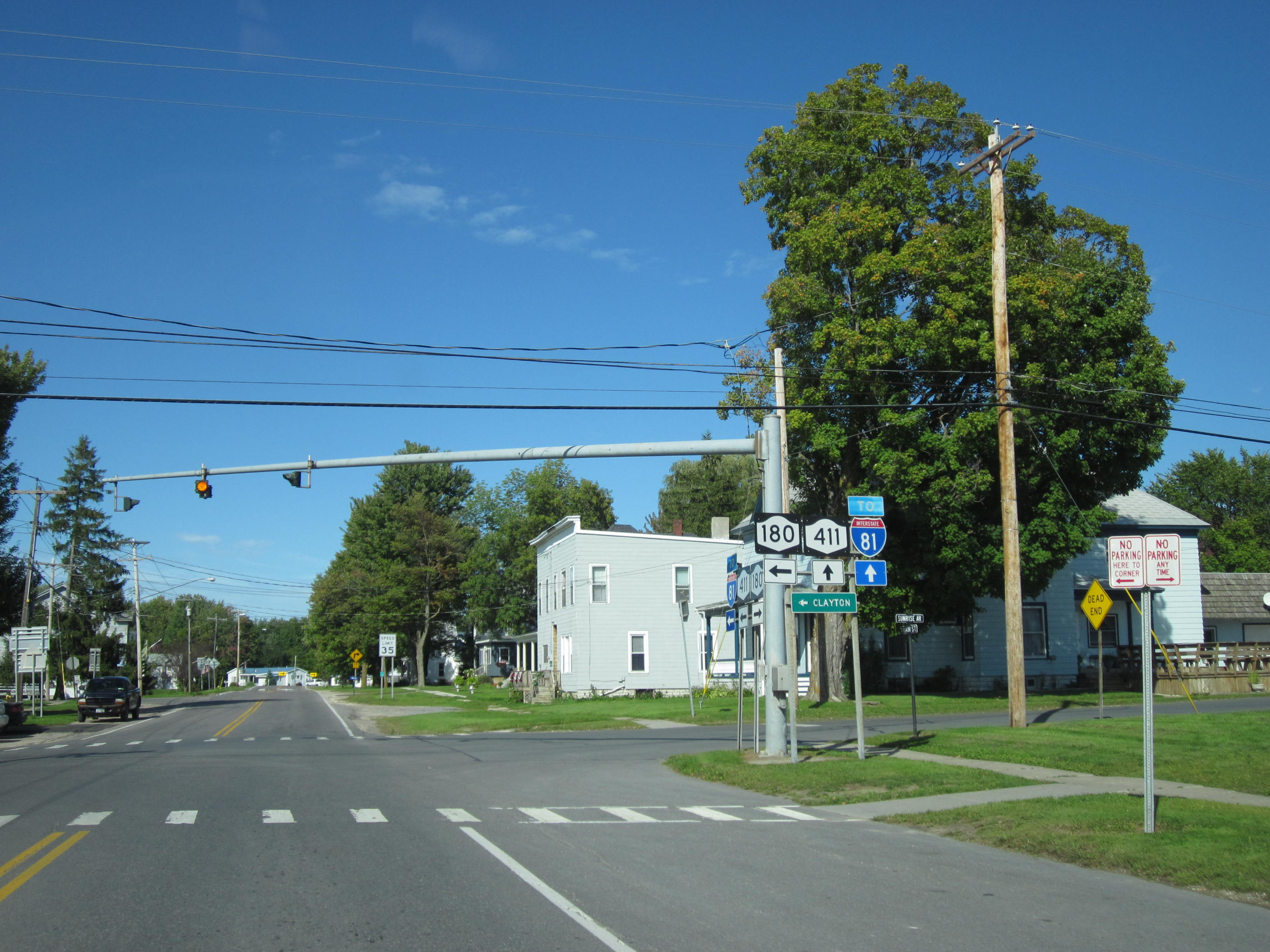
NY 180 at the junction with NY 411 in La Fargeville

NY 180 runs northwest out of Omar, soon turning westward and crossing over Mullet Creek. Less than a block from the Mullet River, NY 180 reaches its northern terminus, a junction with NY 12 just south of Grass Point State Park. Northwest of the junction, the right-of-way continues to the St. Lawrence River and Reed's Point Road as Fishers Landing Road, which was formerly designated as CR 195.

== History ==
NY 180 was assigned as part of the 1930 renumbering of state highways in New York to the portion of its routing north of NY 12 in Clayton. At the same time, a connector between Chaumont and the Clayton hamlet of Depauville was designated as NY 179 while the segment of what is now NY 180 between the Hounsfield hamlet of Baggs Corner and NY 12E (now NY 12F) south of Dexter became NY 409. The portion of modern NY 180 from Dexter to the Brownville community of Limerick was initially part of NY 12E and had been part of NY 3 prior to 1930.

NY 179 was extended south to Baggs Corner c. 1938, supplanting NY 409 and overlapping NY 12E between Chaumont and Dexter. NY 179 was also extended northward to Clayton by way of an overlap with NY 12 around this time. The overlap with NY 12E was slightly reduced in length by the following year when the alignments of NY 12E and NY 12F east of NY 179 were flipped, placing both routes on their modern alignments. NY 179 itself remained unchanged until October 1963, when the designation was completely removed. The portion of NY 179 south of Limerick became a southward extension of NY 180, which connected to Limerick by way of a previously unnumbered roadway between NY 12 and NY 12E. The other independent portion of NY 179 from Chaumont to Depauville—the route's original alignment—is now maintained by Jefferson County as CR 179.

== Major intersections ==
The entire route is in Jefferson County.

Location	mi	km	Destinations	Notes
Hounsfield	0.00	0.00	NY 3 / Great Lakes Seaway Trail – Watertown, Oswego, Rochester	Southern terminus; hamlet of Baggs Corners
Hounsfield	3.23	5.20	NY 12F east – Watertown	Western terminus of NY 12F
Town of Brownville	5.17	8.32	NY 12E / Great Lakes Seaway Trail – Cape Vincent, Watertown	Hamlet of Limerick
Town of Clayton	10.53	16.95	NY 12 – Clayton, Watertown	
Orleans	18.11	29.15	NY 411 east (Main Street) to I-81	Western terminus of NY 411; hamlet of La Fargeville
Orleans	24.50	39.43	NY 12 – Clayton, Alexandria Bay	Northern terminus; hamlet of Fishers Landing
1.000 mi = 1.609 km; 1.000 km = 0.621 mi

== See also ==
- List of county routes in Jefferson County, New York
