= New York State Route 12F =

State highway in Jefferson County, New York, US

New York State Route 12F
- Map of Jefferson and Lewis counties with NY 12F highlighted in red

Route information
- Auxiliary route of NY 12
- Maintained by NYSDOT and the city of Watertown
- Length: 6.89 mi (11.09 km)
- Existed: 1930–present

Major junctions
- West end: NY 180 in Hounsfield
- I-81 in Watertown town
- East end: US 11 / NY 12 in Watertown city

Location
- Country: United States
- State: New York
- Counties: Jefferson

Highway system
- New York Highways; Interstate; US; State; Reference; Parkways
← NY 12E	→ NY 13

New York State Route 12F (NY 12F) is an east–west state highway in Jefferson County, New York, in the United States. It extends for 6.89 miles (11.09 km) from an intersection with NY 180 in the town of Hounsfield to a junction with U.S. Route 11 (US 11) and NY 12 in the city of Watertown. The route follows a parallel routing to that of NY 12E between the vicinity of the village of Dexter and the city of Watertown. While NY 12E runs along the north side of the Black River through this area, NY 12F follows the southern bank. Just east of NY 180, NY 12F serves Watertown International Airport.

Modern NY 12F was added to the state highway system in 1916 and designated as part of NY 3 in 1924. In the 1930 renumbering of state highways in New York, NY 3 was moved onto a new alignment to the east and its former alignment between Watertown and Clayton became NY 12E. Also assigned at this time was NY 12F, which initially used what is now NY 12E from Dexter to Watertown. The alignments of NY 12E and NY 12F east of Dexter were swapped c. 1939.

== Route description ==
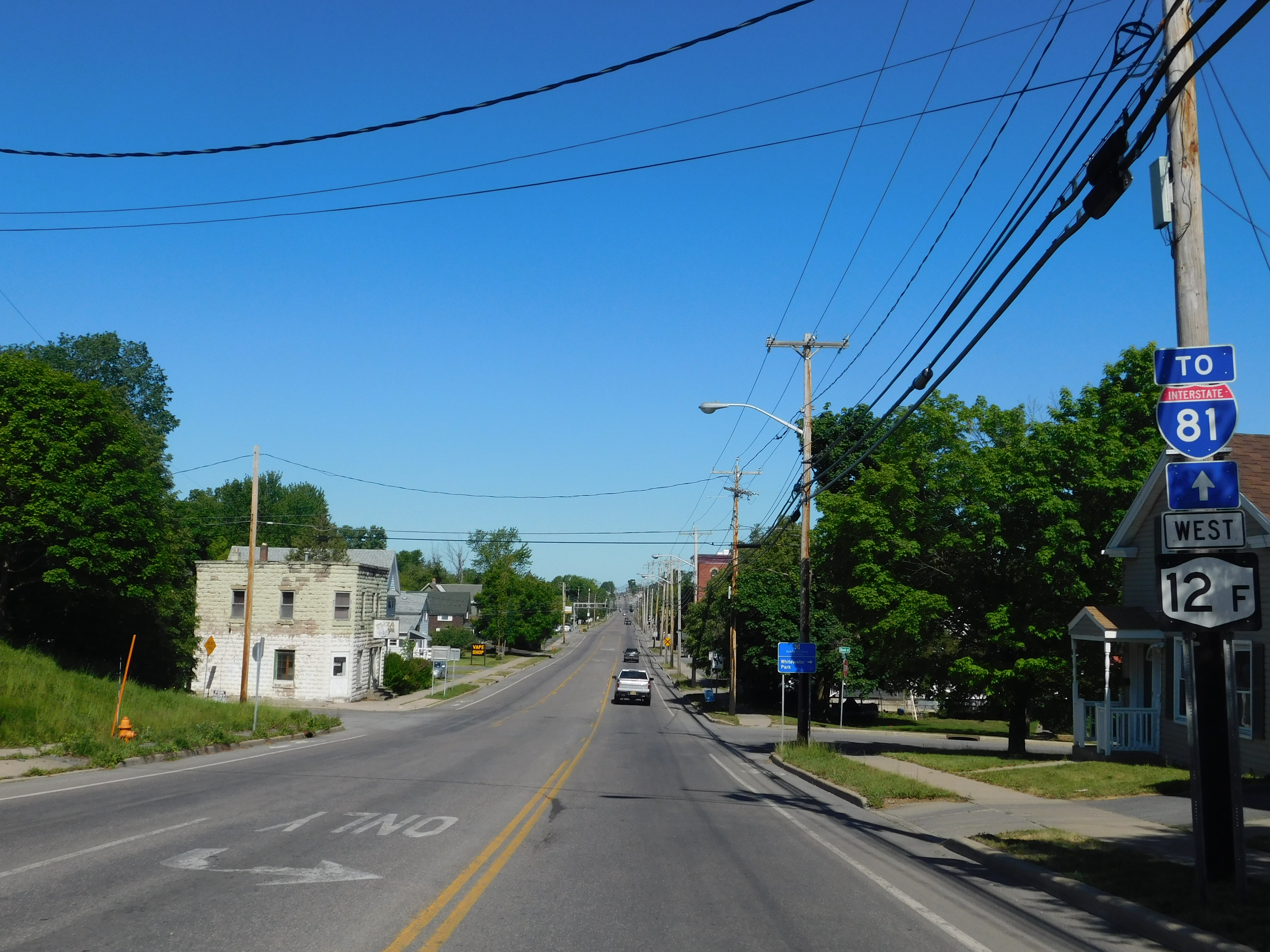
NY 12F westbound in Watertown

NY 12F begins at an intersection with NY 180 south of the village of Dexter in the town of Hounsfield. The route heads to the east, following the southern bank of the Black River through undeveloped areas of Jefferson County. One exception to this lies midway between Dexter and Brownville, however, as NY 12F passes by Watertown International Airport, located in an otherwise barren area south of the highway. East of the airport, the route proceeds to the southern outskirts of Brownville, where it connects to Bridge Street, a connector linking NY 12F to NY 12E on the opposite side of the river in Brownville. The connector is designated as NY 971H, an unsigned reference route. Past Bridge Street, NY 12E becomes the riverside highway—albeit on the northern bank—while NY 12F turns southeast to follow a linear routing into the town of Watertown.

The amount of development along the route begins to rise as the route approaches the city of Watertown. It passes several office parks and the northern access road to Salmon Run Mall on its way to an interchange with Interstate 81 (I-81) at the northwestern city limits of Watertown. The highway continues into the city, where ownership and maintenance of the route shifts from the New York State Department of Transportation (NYSDOT) to the city of Watertown. Within Watertown, NY 12F passes a mixture of commercial and residential areas overlooking the Black River, which rejoins NY 12F several blocks into the city limits. NY 12F and the river enter downtown Watertown soon afterward, where NY 12F ends at a junction with US 11 and NY 12 just northwest of the city's central business district.

== History ==
All of what is now NY 12F outside of the city of Watertown was initially improved to state highway standards in the mid-1910s as part of a project that also upgraded the 2 miles (3.2 km) of modern NY 180 between NY 12F and NY 12E to state standards. The two highways were added to the state highway system on February 8, 1916, following the completion of the $78,015.56 project (equivalent to $2.25 million in 2024). Both roads were collectively designated, but not signed, as State Highway 1182 (SH 1182). When the first set of posted routes in New York were assigned in 1924, all of SH 1182 became part of NY 3. At the time, NY 3 continued south toward Pulaski on current US 11 and north toward Clayton on modern NY 12E.

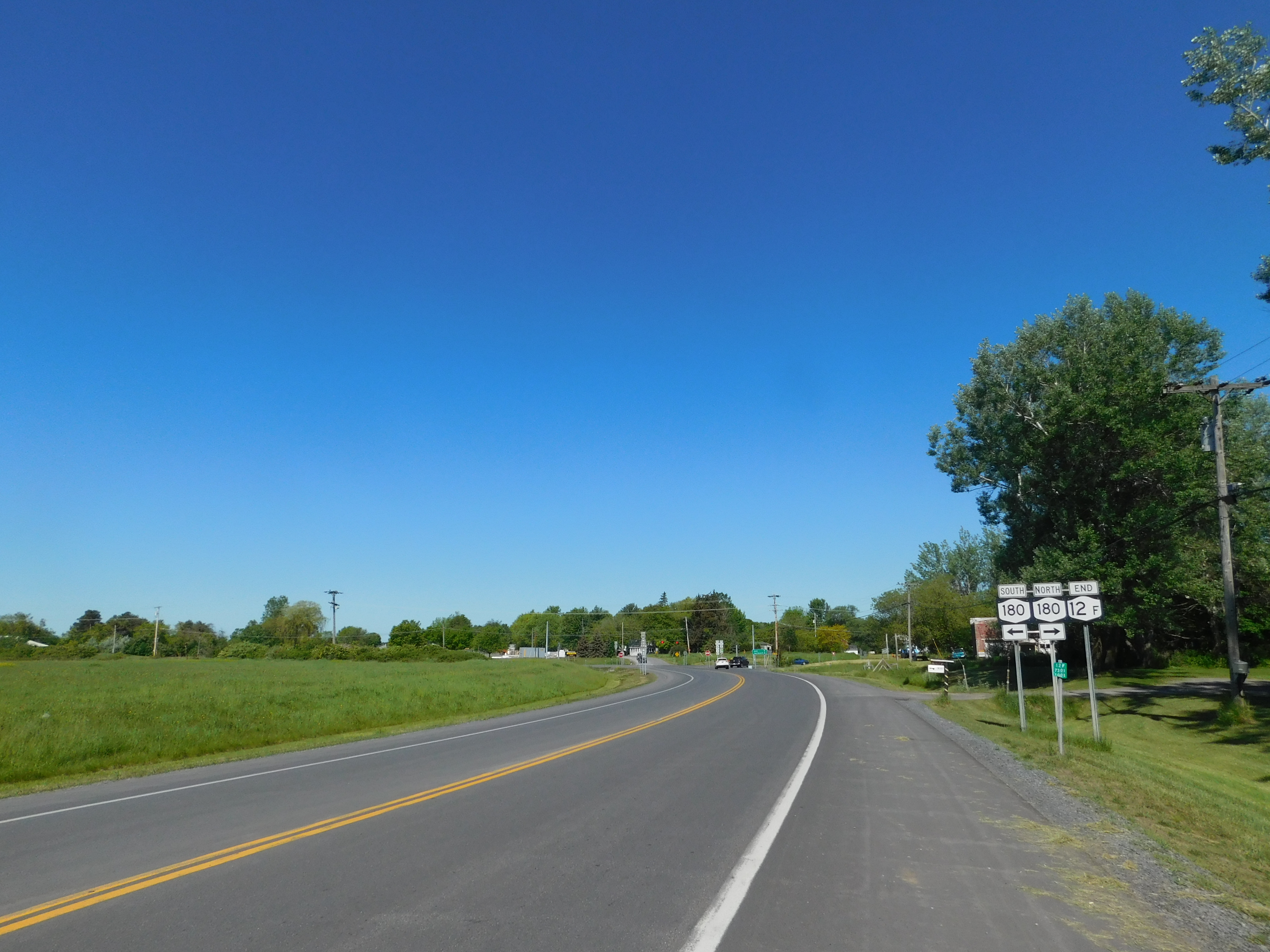
NY 12F at NY 180 in Hounsfield

In the 1930 renumbering of state highways in New York, NY 3 was altered to exit Watertown to the east on its modern alignment while its former routing between Watertown and Clayton via Dexter became NY 12E. At the same time, an alternate route of NY 12E between Dexter and Watertown along the north bank of the Black River was designated as NY 12F. The alignments of NY 12E and NY 12F east of Dexter were swapped c. 1939, placing both routes on their current alignments.

== Major intersections ==
The entire route is in Jefferson County.

Location	mi	km	Destinations	Notes
Hounsfield	0.00	0.00	NY 180 – Dexter, Cape Vincent	Western terminus
Hounsfield	3.25	5.23	To NY 12E – Brownville	Access via NY 971H
Town of Watertown	5.29	8.51	I-81 – Canada, Syracuse	Exit 157 on I-81
City of Watertown	6.89	11.09	US 11 / NY 12	Eastern terminus
1.000 mi = 1.609 km; 1.000 km = 0.621 mi
