= Fishers Landing, New York =

- Census-designated place
- Location within New York Location within the United States
- Coordinates: 44°16′22″N 76°00′01″W
- Country: United States
- State: New York
- County: Jefferson
- Town: Orleans

Area
  - Total: 1.01 sq mi (2.62 km^{2})
  - Land: 0.45 sq mi (1.17 km^{2})
  - Water: 0.56 sq mi (1.45 km^{2})
- Elevation: 305 ft (93 m)

Population (2020)
  - Total: 119
  - Density: 263.8/sq mi (101.84/km^{2})
- Time zone: UTC-5 (Eastern (EST))
  - Summer (DST): UTC-4 (EDT)
- ZIP code: 13641
- Area code: 315
- GNIS feature ID: 972473
- FIPS code: 36-25934

Fishers Landing is a hamlet and census-designated place (CDP) in the town of Orleans in Jefferson County, New York, United States. It is just southwest of Grass Point State Park in the Thousand Islands region of New York. As of the 2020 census the community had a population of 119.

== Geography ==
Fishers Landing is in the northern part of the town of Orleans, on the south bank of the St. Lawrence River where it enters the American Narrows, a channel separating the mainland from Wellesley Island (also part of the town of Orleans). There is a local marina where island owners and visitors park their car/boat while traveling to and from the mainland. The Rock Island Light, a New York state park, is one-half mile (0.80 km) out in the channel from Fishers Landing, and the community of Thousand Island Park is directly across the channel on Wellesley Island.

New York State Route 12 passes along the southeast edge of the Fishers Landing CDP, leading northeast (downstream along the St. Lawrence) 2 miles (3 km) to Interstate 81 and 6 miles (10 km) to Alexandria Bay, and southwest (upriver) 5 miles (8 km) to Clayton. New York State Route 180 intersects Route 12 at Fishers Landing, leading south 6 miles (10 km) to La Fargeville. Watertown, the Jefferson county seat, is 25 miles (40 km) to the south.

According to the U.S. Census Bureau, the Fishers Landing CDP has a total area of 0.22 square miles (0.58 km^{2}), of which 1.0 acre (4,183 m^{2}), or 0.72%, are water.

== Demographics ==
Historical population
Census	Pop.	Note	%±
2010	89		—
2020	119		33.7%
U.S. Decennial Census

== Education ==
The school district is the Thousand Islands Central School District.

== See also ==
- A.E. Vickery
- NEPCO 140 oil spill
