= Dexter Universalist Church =

Dexter Universalist Church may refer to:

- Dexter Universalist Church (Dexter, Maine), listed on the National Register of Historic Places (NRHP) in Penobscot County
- Dexter Universalist Church (Dexter, New York), listed on the NRHP in Jefferson County
