= Clayton Historic District (Clayton, New York) =

Historic district in New York, United States

- U.S. National Register of Historic Places
- U.S. Historic district
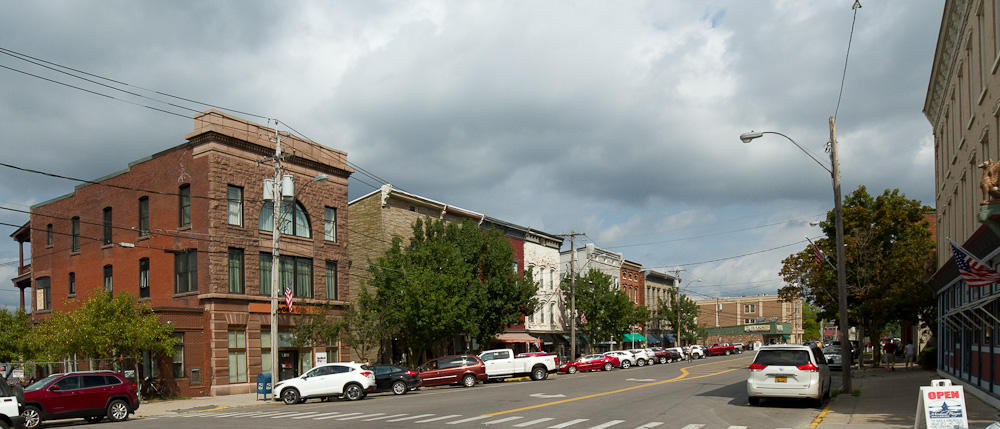

- Location within New York Location within the United States
- Location: 203-215 & 200-326 James St., 500-544 & 507-537 Riverside Dr., (original); 335, 403, 409, 413, 419, and 435 Riverside Dr., (increase); Clayton, New York Clayton, New York
- Coordinates: 44°14′31″N 76°5′22″W
- Built: 1854
- Architect: Multiple
- Architectural style: Italianate, Romanesque (original); Late Victorian, Late 19th And 20th Century Revivals (increase)
- NRHP reference No.: 85002368 and 97000424
- Added to NRHP: September 12, 1985 (original); May 09, 1997 (increase)

The Clayton Historic District is a designated historic district in Clayton, New York. It was originally listed on the National Register of Historic Places in 1985, with its boundaries expanded in 1997.

The district includes the Capt. Simon Johnston House, which is also individually listed on the National Register of Historic Places.
