= Limerick, New York =

- Hamlet
- Location within New York Location within the United States
- Coordinates: 44°01′45″N 76°02′35″W
- Country: United States
- State: New York
- County: Jefferson
- Town: Brownville
- Elevation: 318 ft (97 m)
- Time zone: UTC-5 (Eastern (EST))
  - Summer (DST): UTC-4 (EDT)
- ZIP code: 13657
- Area codes: 315 & 680
- GNIS feature ID: 972725

Limerick is a hamlet in Jefferson County, New York, United States. The community is located in the town of Brownville at the intersection of state routes 12E and 180, 1.5 miles (2.4 km) north of Dexter. Limerick had a post office until June 1, 1998; it still has its own ZIP code, 13657.
