= Clayton, New York =

- Town
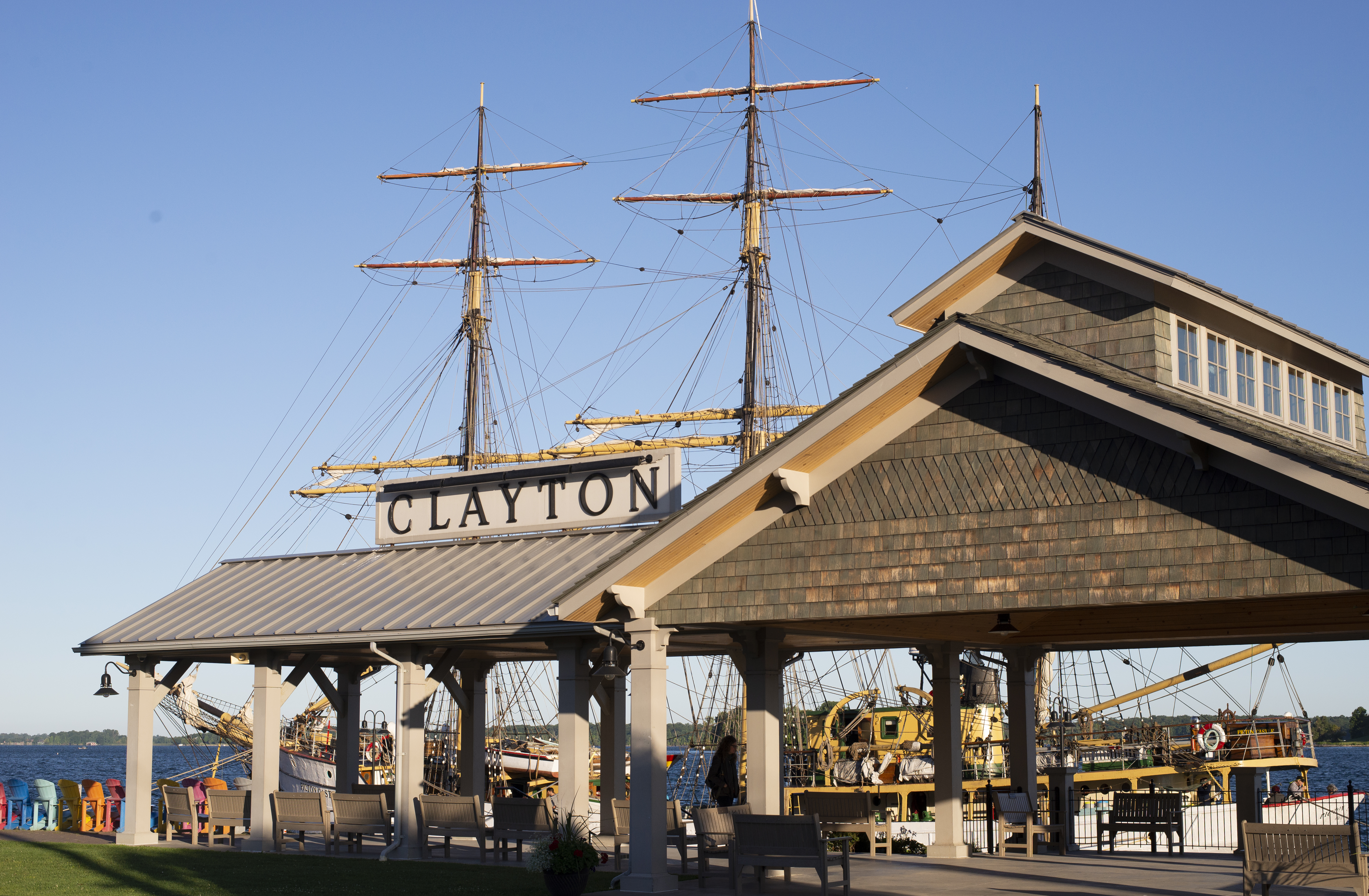
- The Clayton harbor in Frink Park (with the Picton Castle tall ship in the background).

- Location within New York Location within the United States
- Coordinates: 44.1753°N 76.0711°W
- Country: United States
- State: New York
- County: Jefferson

Government
  - Town Supervisor: David M. Storandt, Jr. (R)
  - Town Council: Members: Mary Zovistoski (D); Donna Patchen (R); Christopher Matthews (R); Robert Cantwell, III (R)

Area
  - Total: 104.24 sq mi (269.99 km^{2})
  - Land: 82.54 sq mi (213.78 km^{2})
  - Water: 21.70 sq mi (56.21 km^{2})

Population (2010)
  - Total: 5,153
  - Estimate (2016): 4,928
  - Density: 59.7/sq mi (23.05/km^{2})
- Time zone: UTC-5 (EST)
  - Summer (DST): UTC-4 (EDT)
- ZIP Codes: 13624 (Clayton); 13632 (Depauville); 13601 (Watertown); 13622 (Chaumont); 13641 (Fishers Landing); 13656 (La Fargeville)
- Area code: 315
- FIPS code: 36-045-16100
- Website: townofclaytonny.gov

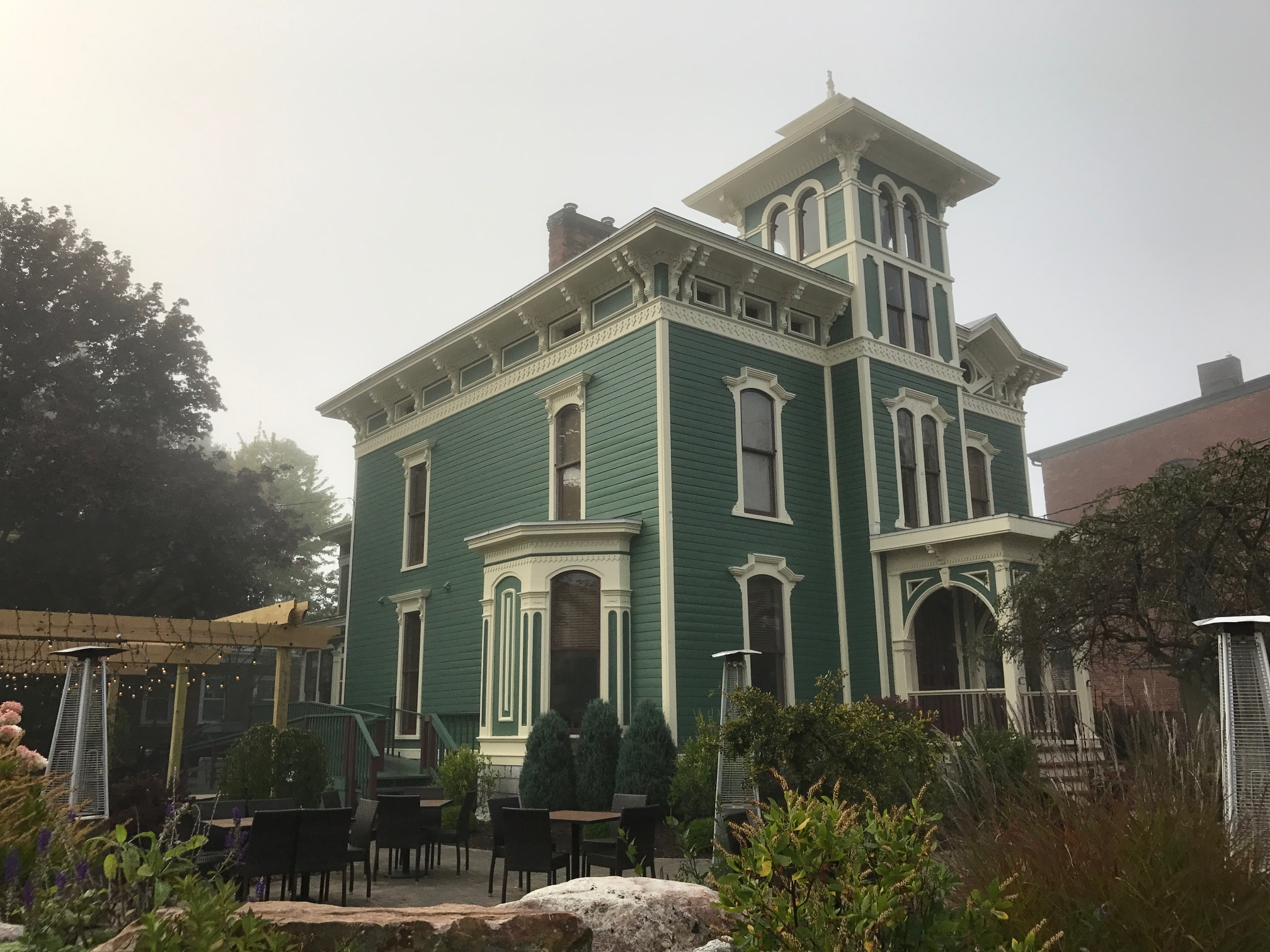
"The Johnston House" is now a high-end restaurant.

Clayton is a town in Jefferson County, New York, United States. The population was 5,153 at the 2010 census. The town is named after John M. Clayton, a federal political leader from Delaware.

The town contains a village also named Clayton. Both are northwest of Watertown.

The village of Clayton, nearby Cape Vincent, and Alexandria Bay are popular tourist destinations on the New York mainland side of the Thousand Islands region.

== History ==
The area was first settled around 1801.

The town was formed from parts of the towns of Orleans and Lyme in 1833. The town was named after statesman John M. Clayton. The village of Clayton became the main railroad terminus for the Thousand Islands resort region, during its heyday at the turn of the twentieth century. The town of Clayton offered several hotels to visitors, some grand, now mostly vanished.

In 1872, the community of Clayton voted to set itself apart from the town by incorporating as a village.

Fairview Manor, Swarthout Site-A04507.000038, and Grindstone Island Upper Schoolhouse are listed on the National Register of Historic Places.

== Geography ==
According to the United States Census Bureau, the town has a total area of 104.0 square miles (269.4 km^{2}), of which 82.4 square miles (213.3 km^{2}) are land and 21.7 square miles (56.1 km^{2}), or 20.83%, are water. The town is situated on the St. Lawrence River near Lake Ontario. Across the river lies Ontario, Canada.

The northern border of the town is the Canada–US border running through the Thousand Islands in the St. Lawrence River. The town includes the fourth largest of the Thousand Islands, Grindstone Island, along with smaller islands, such as Bluff Island, Grenell Island, Maple Island, Picton Island, and Round Island.

A ferry once connected Clayton with Gananoque in Ontario, but was discontinued due to the construction of the Thousand Islands Bridge 10 miles (16 km) northeast (down-river). This bridge now carries traffic from Interstate 81 into Canada.

New York State Route 12E, which follows the south bank of the St. Lawrence River, intersects north-south New York State Route 12 at Clayton village. New York State Route 180 crosses the southeastern corner of Clayton.

== Demographics ==
Historical population
Census	Pop.	Note	%±
1840	3,990		—
1850	4,191		5.0%
1860	4,696		12.0%
1870	4,082		−13.1%
1880	4,214		3.2%
1890	4,411		4.7%
1900	4,313		−2.2%
1910	4,028		−6.6%
1920	3,618		−10.2%
1930	3,698		2.2%
1940	3,768		1.9%
1950	3,758		−0.3%
1960	3,753		−0.1%
1970	4,021		7.1%
1980	4,028		0.2%
1990	4,629		14.9%
2000	4,817		4.1%
2010	5,153		7.0%
2016 (est.)	4,928	▼	−4.4%
U.S. Decennial Census

As of the census of 2000, there were 4,817 people, 1,914 households, and 1,335 families residing in the town. The population density was 58.3 inhabitants per square mile (22.5/km^{2}). There were 3,337 housing units at an average density of 40.4 per square mile (15.6/km^{2}). The racial makeup of the town was 97.24% White, 0.93% Black or African American, 0.35% Native American, 0.23% Asian, 0.10% Pacific Islander, 0.48% from other races, and 0.66% from two or more races. Hispanic or Latino of any race were 1.58% of the population.

There were 1,914 households, out of which 34.5% had children under the age of 18 living with them, 57.0% were married couples living together, 8.6% had a female householder with no husband present, and 30.2% were non-families. 25.1% of all households were made up of individuals, and 13.0% had someone living alone who was 65 years of age or older. The average household size was 2.51 and the average family size was 3.00.

In the town, the population was spread out, with 26.7% under the age of 18, 6.5% from 18 to 24, 29.0% from 25 to 44, 22.6% from 45 to 64, and 15.1% who were 65 years of age or older. The median age was 38 years. For every 100 females, there were 94.1 males. For every 100 females age 18 and over, there were 91.7 males.

The median income for a household in the town was $35,805, and the median income for a family was $39,727. Males had a median income of $31,402 versus $21,091 for females. The per capita income for the town was $16,947. About 4.8% of families and 8.0% of the population were below the poverty line, including 11.0% of those under age 18 and 7.0% of those age 65 or over.

== Communities and topographic features ==
- Aunt Janes Bay – A bay on the south shore of Grindstone Island.
- Bartlett's Point – A hamlet west of Clayton village, located on a geographical feature called Bartlett Point.
- Blind Bay – A small bay of the St. Lawrence River by the eastern town line.
- Chaumont River – A stream flowing through the south part of Clayton; it is a tributary of Chaumont Bay in Lake Ontario.
- Clayton – A village on the shore of the St. Lawrence River in the northern part of the town.
- Clayton Center – A hamlet located on County Road 10 in the eastern part of the town.
- Depauville – A hamlet and census-designated place on NY-12, south of Clayton village, located by the Chaumont River.
- Delaney Bay – A bay in the eastern part of Grindstone Island.
- Flynn Bay – A bay at the southwestern part of Grindstone Island.
- French Creek – A tributary of the St. Lawerence River which empties into French Creek Bay.
- French Creek Bay – A bay on the western side of Clayton village.
- French Creek Wildlife Management Area – A conservation area in the northern part of Clayton.
- Frontenac – A hamlet on the northeastern end of Round Island.
- Frontenac Springs – A location in the northwestern corner of Clayton, known for its natural crystal spring water. Frontenac Crystal Spring Water is trucked all over, can be purchased in one or five-gallon jugs or filled in their self-serve area.
- Grenell Island – An island in the St. Lawrence River by the eastern town line.
- Grenell – A hamlet on Grenell Island.
- Grindstone – A hamlet on the northern side of Grindstone Island.
- Grindstone Island – The fourth largest of the Thousand Islands. It lies in the St. Lawerence River opposite Clayton village.
- Gunns Corners – A hamlet in the southeastern corner of the town on NY-180 at NY-12.
- Murray Isle – An island in the St. Lawrence River by the eastern town line.
- Reynolds Corners – A location at the southern town line on County Road 125.
- Round Island – An island in the St. Lawrence River north east of Clayton with many summer homes. Little Round Island is adjacent to it.
- Schnauber Hill – An elevation by the eastern town line.
- Smith Corners – A location on NY-12 between Depauville and Clayton village.
- Washington Island – A small island next to Clayton village.

== Parks ==
- Canoe-Picnic Point State Park – A state park on Grindstone Island accessible only by boat.
- Cedar Point State Park – A state park by the western town line.

== Activities ==
- Antique Boat Museum
- Rock Island Lighthouse
- Frink Park
- Clayton Island Tours

== Places To Visit ==
- Clayton Chamber of Commerce

== Notable people ==
- Charles E. Bohlen, diplomat and ambassador
- Albert Bouchard and Joe Bouchard, founding members of the band Blue Öyster Cult
- Mary Fowkes (1954–2020), physician and neuropathologist
- Abbie Hoffman, political and social activist. While using the alias 'Barry Freed', he founded Save the River.
- May Irwin, singer and star of vaudeville. Summer resident and eventual retiree.
- Bill Johnston, Thousand Islands smuggler and river pirate
- Joseph Lonsway, private in the Union Army and Congressional Medal of Honor recipient
- Nancy Fowler McCormick, philanthropist
