= Grass Point State Park =

Park in New York, USA

- Location within New York
- Type: State park
- Location: 42247 Grassy Point Road; Alexandria Bay, New York
- Nearest city: Alexandria Bay, New York
- Coordinates: 44°16′59″N 76°00′00″W
- Area: 114 acres (0.46 km^{2})
- Operator: New York State Office of Parks, Recreation and Historic Preservation
- Visitors: 38,109 (in 2014)
- Open: Mid-May through mid-October
- Website: Grass Point State Park

Grass Point State Park is a 114-acre (0.46 km^{2}) state park located in the Town of Orleans in Jefferson County, New York. The park is located along the St. Lawrence River by NY 12 and NY 180, between Clayton and Alexandria Bay.

== Park description ==
Grass Point State Park offers picnic tables with pavilions, a playground and playing fields, fishing and ice fishing, a boat launch and docks, a swimming beach, and seasonal hunting. A nearly one-mile-long (1.6 km) snowmobile trail passes through the park, which may be used for hiking during the summer months.

The park also includes a campground with 53 tent and 19 trailer sites, in addition to Grass Point Cottage, a two-story full-service accommodation located on the river's edge. The park is open from mid-May through mid-October.

The park offers views of nearby Rock Island Light, also owned by New York State but accessible only by boat.

== See also ==
- List of New York state parks
- Fishers Landing, New York
