= Glen Park, New York =

- Village
- Location within New York Location within the United States
- Coordinates: 43°59′56″N 75°57′8″W
- Country: United States
- State: New York
- County: Jefferson
- Towns: Brownville, Pamelia

Area
  - Total: 0.75 sq mi (1.95 km^{2})
  - Land: 0.71 sq mi (1.85 km^{2})
  - Water: 0.039 sq mi (0.10 km^{2})
- Elevation: 341 ft (104 m)

Population (2020)
  - Total: 452
  - Density: 632.9/sq mi (244.38/km^{2})
- Time zone: UTC-5 (Eastern (EST))
  - Summer (DST): UTC-4 (EDT)
- ZIP code: 13601
- Area code: 315
- FIPS code: 36-29322
- GNIS feature ID: 0970168
- Website: https://www.villageofglenparkny.gov/

Glen Park is a village in Jefferson County, New York, United States. As of the 2020 census, Glen Park had a population of 452. The village is on the border of the towns of Brownville and Pamelia and is immediately northwest of Watertown.

== History ==
The village was built up around the Remington Paper Company and incorporated in 1893.

The village was also the site of an amusement and picnic grounds operated by a local streetcar company. Extensive caves and endangered bat hibernaculum in the vicinity.

== Geography ==
Glen Park is located in central Jefferson County at 43°59′56″N 75°57′8″W (43.998895, -75.952235). The majority of the village is in the southeastern corner of the town of Brownville, with a small portion extending east into the town of Pamelia. The village is bordered to the west by the village of Brownville and to the south by the Black River, which forms the border with the town of Watertown.

According to the United States Census Bureau, Glen Park has a total area of 0.73 square miles (1.9 km^{2}), of which 0.02 square miles (0.06 km^{2}), or 3.30%, are water.

County Route 190, sometimes shown on maps as New York State Route 12E, is the main road through Glen Park. It leads southeast (upstream along the Black River) 3.8 miles (6.1 km) to the center of Watertown and west 0.7 miles (1.1 km) to NY-12E in Brownville village.

== Demographics ==
Historical population
Census	Pop.	Note	%±
1900	494		—
1910	522		5.7%
1920	661		26.6%
1930	559		−15.4%
1940	523		−6.4%
1950	516		−1.3%
1960	561		8.7%
1970	587		4.6%
1980	504		−14.1%
1990	527		4.6%
2000	487		−7.6%
2010	502		3.1%
2020	452		−10.0%
U.S. Decennial Census

As of the census of 2000, there were 487 people, 175 households, and 131 families residing in the village. The population density was 693.5 inhabitants per square mile (267.8/km^{2}). There were 190 housing units at an average density of 270.5 per square mile (104.4/km^{2}). The racial makeup of the village was 96.92% White, 0.21% African American, 0.82% Native American, 0.41% Asian, 1.03% from other races, and 0.62% from two or more races. Hispanic or Latino of any race were 1.23% of the population.

There were 175 households, out of which 45.1% had children under the age of 18 living with them, 53.7% were married couples living together, 13.1% had a female householder with no husband present, and 25.1% were non-families. 21.7% of all households were made up of individuals, and 8.6% had someone living alone who was 65 years of age or older. The average household size was 2.78 and the average family size was 3.18.

In the village, the population was spread out, with 31.2% under the age of 18, 7.2% from 18 to 24, 31.6% from 25 to 44, 17.0% from 45 to 64, and 12.9% who were 65 years of age or older. The median age was 32 years. For every 100 females, there were 87.3 males. For every 100 females age 18 and over, there were 93.6 males.

The median income for a household in the village was $32,250, and the median income for a family was $42,500. Males had a median income of $33,750 versus $20,500 for females. The per capita income for the village was $13,159. About 8.9% of families and 14.3% of the population were below the poverty line, including 14.3% of those under age 18 and 16.0% of those age 65 or over.

== Education ==
The school district is General Brown Central School District.
