= La Fargeville, New York =

- Census-designated place
- Location within New York Location within the United States
- Coordinates: 44°11′39″N 75°58′6″W
- Country: United States
- State: New York
- County: Jefferson
- Town: Orleans
- Named after: Jean Frédéric de la Farge

Area
  - Total: 3.37 sq mi (8.73 km^{2})
  - Land: 3.31 sq mi (8.58 km^{2})
  - Water: 0.054 sq mi (0.14 km^{2})
- Elevation: 377 ft (115 m)

Population (2020)
  - Total: 537
  - Density: 162.0/sq mi (62.56/km^{2})
- Time zone: UTC-5 (Eastern (EST))
  - Summer (DST): UTC-4 (EDT)
- ZIP Code: 13656
- Area code: 315
- FIPS code: 36-40233
- GNIS feature ID: 0954846

La Fargeville is a hamlet and census-designated place (CDP) in the town of Orleans in Jefferson County, New York, United States. The population was 733 at the 2020 census. The hamlet is named after John Frederick La Farge, one of the early proprietors of the town. La Fargeville was once a village, but dissolved its municipal corporation in 1922.

La Fargeville is north of Watertown. The small hamlet has one school, LaFargeville Central School, which serves Pre-K through 12th grade. La Fargeville Central School is ranked the 911th largest public school, 17,312th nationally, and has a total student population of 552.

== History ==
The hamlet was previously called "Log Mills" when it was first settled around 1816, due to the construction of a sawmill for logs. John Frederick La Farge, a French immigrant who had Americanized his name from Jean Frédéric de la Farge, arrived in 1826. Already wealthy from an import business he had set up in New Orleans, he began in the 1820s to buy real estate and build houses in Jefferson County, speculation that eventually led to La Fargeville being named after him. His son John La Farge became a well-known artist.

By 1850, the population was about 300.

== Geography ==
La Fargeville is in northern Jefferson County, in the central part of the town of Orleans. The Chaumont River, a southwest-flowing tributary of Lake Ontario, flows through the center of the community.

According to the United States Census Bureau, the CDP has a total area of 3.4 square miles (8.7 km^{2}), of which 3.3 square miles (8.6 km^{2}) are land and 0.04 square miles (0.1 km^{2}), or 1.62%, are water.

La Fargeville is at the junction of New York State Route 180 and New York State Route 411 (Plank Road). NY-180 leads north 7 miles (11 km) to Fishers Landing on the St. Lawrence River and south 14 miles (23 km) to Dexter at the mouth of the Black River into Lake Ontario. NY-411 leads east 4 miles (6 km) to Interstate 81 and 9 miles (14 km) to Theresa. County Road 181 (Plank Street) serves the hamlet from the west, leading 7 miles (11 km) to Clayton on the St. Lawrence. Watertown, the Jefferson county seat, is 17 miles (27 km) south of La Fargeville via Routes 180 and 12.

== Demographics ==
Historical population
Census	Pop.	Note	%±
2020	537		—
U.S. Decennial Census

As of the census of 2000, there were 588 people, 219 households, and 160 families residing in the CDP. The population density was 169.2 inhabitants per square mile (65.3/km^{2}). There were 236 housing units at an average density of 67.9 per square mile (26.2/km^{2}). The racial makeup of the CDP was 95.41% White, 2.21% African American, 1.36% Native American, 0.34% Asian, and 0.68% from two or more races. Hispanic or Latino of any race were 0.17% of the population.

There were 219 households, out of which 32.9% had children under the age of 18 living with them, 54.3% were married couples living together, 13.7% had a female householder with no husband present, and 26.9% were non-families. 25.6% of all households were made up of individuals, and 10.5% had someone living alone who was 65 years of age or older. The average household size was 2.67 and the average family size was 3.11.

In the CDP, the population was spread out, with 28.2% under the age of 18, 8.3% from 18 to 24, 27.9% from 25 to 44, 22.8% from 45 to 64, and 12.8% who were 65 years of age or older. The median age was 36 years. For every 100 females, there were 82.6 males. For every 100 females age 18 and over, there were 81.9 males.

The median income for a household in the CDP was $29,286, and the median income for a family was $41,705. Males had a median income of $21,750 versus $24,306 for females. The per capita income for the CDP was $13,816. About 22.5% of families and 28.1% of the population were below the poverty line, including 48.9% of those under age 18 and 8.9% of those age 65 or over.

== Education ==
The school district is La Fargeville Central School District.
