= Depauville, New York =

Settlement in Clayton, New York

- Census-designated place
- Location within New York Location within the United States
- Coordinates: 44°8′35″N 76°3′28″W
- Country: United States
- State: New York
- County: Jefferson
- Town: Clayton

Area
  - Total: 9.82 sq mi (25.44 km^{2})
  - Land: 9.82 sq mi (25.44 km^{2})
  - Water: 0 sq mi (0.00 km^{2})
- Elevation: 305 ft (93 m)

Population (2020)
  - Total: 488
  - Density: 49.7/sq mi (19.18/km^{2})
- Time zone: UTC-5 (Eastern (EST))
  - Summer (DST): UTC-4 (EDT)
- ZIP Codes: 13632 (Depauville); 13622 (Chaumont); 13624 (Clayton); 13656 (La Fargeville)
- Area code: 315
- FIPS code: 36-20302
- GNIS feature ID: 0948332

Depauville is a hamlet and census-designated place (CDP) in the southern region of the town of Clayton, within Jefferson County, New York, United States. As of the 2020 census, Depauville had a population of 488.

== History ==
In 1784, the Oneida people ceded all territory to the state of New York except for a tract of land around 100 square miles (260 km^{2}) known as Penet Square. The Oneida considered the tract as a gift to Pierre Penet. After Penet's death, rights of land ownership were blurred and squatters occupied the territory as early as 1785. Catfish Falls was a settlement at the head of the Chaumont River, named after the 25-foot (7.6 m) waterfall within the settlement. The squatters that inhabited this area were often called "Catfish People", marking their settlement from the clearing of trees establishing its boundaries. In 1816, merchant Francis Depau purchased several lots in Penet Square including Catfish Falls, later renaming the settlement "Depauville" after himself.

Depauville during the early 1800s was a site of manufacturing; the settlement contained a gristmill and sawmill. Lumber was a profitable resource for the region. Depauville also produced limewater, nearly 1,000 barrels after two years of production, a first for the county. Around 1868 the Depauville Steamboat Company was established and produced side-wheel steamboats. The M. W. Wright was constructed in 1968, a steam-powered vessel 70 feet (21 m) from bow to stern, with a width of 14 feet (4.3 m), and weighing in at nearly 43 tons. The ship was large enough to raise concerns on its capability to navigate the shallow waters of the Chaumont River before reaching Lake Ontario.

Depauville's first Fire District was created in 1932 and during the Great Depression housed a camp of the Civilian Conservation Corps (CCC). The CCC established a headquarters consisting of ten camps at the Madison Barracks in Sackets Harbor.

Depauville saw damage from a microburst on July 15, 1995. In 1996, the Clayton Fire District formed, bringing the Depauville Fire Department under the same umbrella with the Clayton Fire Department, although each retained its identity. Depauville in January 1998 witnessed one of the most destructive natural disasters that Jefferson County had ever endured, the Ice Storm of 1998, 36 hours of freezing rain that left damaged homes and properties, impassable roadways and many people powerless and hungry for weeks.

== Geography ==
Depauville is located in northern Jefferson County at 44°8′35″N 76°3′28″W (44.143189, -76.057757), in the southern part of the town of Clayton. According to the United States Census Bureau, the CDP has a total area of 9.8 square miles (25.4 km^{2}), all land.

Depauville hamlet is located at the junction of New York State Route 12 and County Roads 11 (Sylvia Street), 12 (Overbluff Road), and 179 (Caroline Street). Route 12 leads north 7 miles (11 km) to the village of Clayton on the St. Lawrence River and southeast 14 miles (23 km) to Watertown, the county seat. The village is mostly on the south bank of the Chaumont River.

== Recreation ==
Depauville provides community events held at each of two churches, the fire department banquet hall and public library. Depauville also has a small town market and a bar, the Depauville Hotel. The Depauville Hotel is one of many stops for snowmobilers during the winter months as it is a crossroad of snowmobile trails that travel north to Clayton and eventually Gouverneur or west to Chaumont that accesses Lake Ontario. Depauville is a site for hunting and fishing as the salmon spawn and migration includes the Chaumont River from Lake Ontario. Access to the Thousand Islands region is a 10-minute drive northbound on State Route 12.

== Demographics ==
Historical population
Census	Pop.	Note	%±
2020	488		—
U.S. Decennial Census

As of the census of 2000, there were 512 people, 178 households, and 137 families residing in the CDP. The population density was 52.3 inhabitants per square mile (20.2/km^{2}). There were 203 housing units at an average density of 20.7 per square mile (8.0/km^{2}). The racial makeup of the CDP was 99.22% White, 0.39% from other races, and 0.39% from two or more races. Hispanic or Latino of any race were 0.59% of the population.

There were 178 households, out of which 44.9% had children under the age of 18 living with them, 60.1% were married couples living together, 12.4% had a female householder with no husband present, and 23.0% were non-families. 17.4% of all households were made up of individuals, and 7.3% had someone living alone who was 65 years of age or older. The average household size was 2.88 and the average family size was 3.27.

In the CDP, the population was spread out, with 32.2% under the age of 18, 7.0% from 18 to 24, 32.8% from 25 to 44, 18.9% from 45 to 64, and 9.0% who were 65 years of age or older. The median age was 32 years. For every 100 females, there were 102.4 males. For every 100 females age 18 and over, there were 92.8 males.

The median income for a household in the CDP was $37,411, and the median income for a family was $35,893. Males had a median income of $31,184 versus $21,042 for females. The per capita income for the CDP was $17,172. None of the families and 1.6% of the population were living below the poverty line, including no under eighteens and none of those over 64.

== Education ==
Most of the CDP is in the Thousand Islands Central School District, while a portion is in the La Fargeville Central School District.
