= Lorraine, New York =

- Town
- Location within New York Location within the United States
- Coordinates: 43°45′11″N 75°58′40″W
- Country: United States
- State: New York
- County: Jefferson

Government
  - Type: Town Council
  - Town Supervisor: Vincent Moore (R)
  - Town Council: Members' List: • David L. Johnson (R); • Stacey L. Pitkin (D); • Lynn Burnham (R); • Vacant

Area
  - Total: 39.02 sq mi (101.06 km^{2})
  - Land: 39.00 sq mi (101.02 km^{2})
  - Water: 0.019 sq mi (0.05 km^{2})
- Elevation: 1,001 ft (305 m)

Population (2020)
  - Total: 924
  - Estimate (2016): 1,023
  - Density: 26.2/sq mi (10.13/km^{2})
- Time zone: UTC-5 (Eastern (EST))
  - Summer (DST): UTC-4 (EDT)
- ZIP Codes: 13659 (Lorraine); 13605 (Adams); 13661 (Mannsville)
- Area code: 315
- FIPS code: 36-045-43544
- GNIS feature ID: 0979169
- Website: www.townoflorraineny.us

Lorraine is a town in Jefferson County, New York, United States. The population was 1,037 at the 2010 census, up from 930 in 2000. The town is named after Lorraine, a region in France.

The town is on the southern border of the county and is south of Watertown.

== History ==
Settlement began around 1802. The original designation for this area was "Atticus".

The town was formed in 1804 from part of the town of Mexico in Oswego County. At that time the new town was called "Malta", but the name was changed to "Lorraine" in 1808 in order to avoid confusion with the town of Malta in Saratoga County.

Part of Lorraine was used to form the town of Worth in 1848.

== Geography ==
According to the United States Census Bureau, the town has a total area of 39.0 square miles (101.0 km^{2}), of which 0.02 square miles (0.05 km^{2}), or 0.05%, are water.

The southern town line is the border of Oswego County.

South Sandy Creek is an important stream flowing through the northern part of the town.

== Demographics ==
Historical population
Census	Pop.	Note	%±
1820	1,112		—
1830	1,727		55.3%
1840	1,699		−1.6%
1850	1,511		−11.1%
1860	1,687		11.6%
1870	1,377		−18.4%
1880	1,435		4.2%
1890	1,174		−18.2%
1900	1,019		−13.2%
1910	940		−7.8%
1920	790		−16.0%
1930	848		7.3%
1940	782		−7.8%
1950	681		−12.9%
1960	609		−10.6%
1970	628		3.1%
1980	720		14.6%
1990	766		6.4%
2000	930		21.4%
2010	1,037		11.5%
2020	924		−10.9%
U.S. Decennial Census

As of the census of 2000, there were 930 people, 327 households, and 248 families residing in the town. The population density was 23.8 inhabitants per square mile (9.2/km^{2}). There were 400 housing units at an average density of 10.3 per square mile (4.0/km^{2}). The racial makeup of the town was 99.57% White, and 0.43% from two or more races. Hispanic or Latino of any race were 0.43% of the population.

There were 327 households, out of which 41.3% had children under the age of 18 living with them, 61.2% were married couples living together, 7.3% had a female householder with no husband present, and 23.9% were non-families. 17.4% of all households were made up of individuals, and 6.7% had someone living alone who was 65 years of age or older. The average household size was 2.84 and the average family size was 3.24.

In the town, the population was spread out, with 31.1% under the age of 18, 5.9% from 18 to 24, 34.3% from 25 to 44, 21.4% from 45 to 64, and 7.3% who were 65 years of age or older. The median age was 34 years. For every 100 females, there were 101.7 males. For every 100 females age 18 and over, there were 104.1 males.

The median income for a household in the town was $38,523, and the median income for a family was $40,417. Males had a median income of $32,083 versus $25,000 for females. The per capita income for the town was $14,471. About 9.8% of families and 15.5% of the population were below the poverty line, including 15.5% of those under age 18 and 17.9% of those age 65 or over.

== Communities and locations in Lorraine ==
- Allendale – A hamlet located in the northwestern corner of the town on County Road 97. It was formerly called "Caulkins Mill".
- Gould Corners – A location near the northern town line on County Road 97.
- Haights Corners – A location near the western town line on County Road 91.
- Lorraine – A hamlet and census-designated place on County Road 189 in the north-central part of the town. The community was first settled around 1803 and called "Lorraine Huddle".
- Lorraine Gulf – A valley in the northern part of the town.
- South Sandy Creek – A stream flowing through Lorraine Gulf in the northern part of Lorraine.
- Totmans Gulf – A valley in the western part of the town.
- Waterville – A hamlet near the eastern border of the town.
- Winona – A hamlet in the southern part of the town on County Road 90.
