= Lorraine (CDP), New York =

Lorraine, New York
- Census-designated place
- Location within New York Location within the United States
- Coordinates: 43°45′57″N 75°57′33″W
- Country: United States
- State: New York
- County: Jefferson
- Town: Lorraine

Area
  - Total: 0.49 sq mi (1.27 km^{2})
  - Land: 0.49 sq mi (1.27 km^{2})
  - Water: 0 sq mi (0.00 km^{2})
- Elevation: 998 ft (304 m)

Population (2020)
  - Total: 139
  - Density: 283.8/sq mi (109.58/km^{2})
- Time zone: UTC-5 (Eastern (EST))
  - Summer (DST): UTC-4 (EDT)
- ZIP code: 13659
- Area code: 315
- FIPS code: 36-43533
- GNIS feature ID: 0955999

Lorraine is a hamlet and census-designated place (CDP) in the town of Lorraine in Jefferson County, New York, United States. The population was 174 at the 2010 census, out of 1,037 in the entire town of Lorraine.

== Geography ==
The hamlet of Lorraine is in southern Jefferson County, northeast of the center of the town of Lorraine. The community sits in the valley of Big Brook on the northwestern edge of the Tug Hill Plateau.

According to the United States Census Bureau, the CDP has a total area of 0.48 square miles (1.25 km^{2}), all land.

Lorraine is at the intersection of County Routes 189, 93, and 92. It is 20 miles (32 km) by highway (or 15 miles (24 km) in a straight line) south of Watertown, the county seat. It is 5 miles (8 km) southeast of Adams via County Route 189.

== Demographics ==
Historical population
Census	Pop.	Note	%±
2020	139		—
U.S. Decennial Census

== Education ==
The school district is the South Jefferson Central School District.
