= Worth, New York =

- Town
- Location within New York Location within the United States
- Coordinates: 43°45′34″N 75°51′53″W
- Country: United States
- State: New York
- County: Jefferson

Government
  - Type: Town Council
  - Town Supervisor: David M. Paradis (D)
  - Town Council: Members' List: • Linda A. Sicley (R); • Nancy J. Bice (R); • John H. Bice (R); • Kathy E. Pearson (R)

Area
  - Total: 43.26 sq mi (112.04 km^{2})
  - Land: 43.17 sq mi (111.82 km^{2})
  - Water: 0.085 sq mi (0.22 km^{2})
- Elevation: 1,519 ft (463 m)

Population (2010)
  - Total: 231
  - Estimate (2016): 229
  - Density: 5.3/sq mi (2.05/km^{2})
- Time zone: UTC-5 (Eastern (EST))
  - Summer (DST): UTC-4 (EDT)
- ZIP Codes: 13659 (Lorraine); 13682 (Rodman)
- Area code: 315
- FIPS code: 36-045-83162
- GNIS feature ID: 0979657
- Website: www.tughillcouncil.com/member-towns/town-of-worth/

Worth is a town in Jefferson County, New York, United States. The population was 231 at the 2010 census. The town is named after William Worth, a commander of troops during the Battle of Sackett's Harbor.

The town of Worth is located in the southeastern corner of the county and is south of Watertown.

== History ==
The town was first settled circa 1802. Difficulties in successful settlement and the War of 1812 led to a partial abandonment of the town.

The town was created by separation from the town of Lorraine in 1848. An earlier attempt to form this town was disrupted by the War of 1812.

Worth attained its greatest population in 1900, at 2,895.

== Geography ==
Worth stands on the northwest side of the Tug Hill Plateau. According to the United States Census Bureau, the town has a total area of 43.3 square miles (112.2 km^{2}), of which 43.2 square miles (111.9 km^{2}) are land and 0.077 square miles (0.2 km^{2}), or 0.20%, are water.

The southern town line is the border of Oswego County, and the eastern (and part of the northern) town line is the border of Lewis County.

== Demographics ==
Historical population
Census	Pop.	Note	%±
1850	326		—
1860	634		94.5%
1870	727		14.7%
1880	951		30.8%
1890	2,278		139.5%
1900	2,895		27.1%
1910	597		−79.4%
1920	545		−8.7%
1930	415		−23.9%
1940	318		−23.4%
1950	253		−20.4%
1960	193		−23.7%
1970	185		−4.1%
1980	153		−17.3%
1990	219		43.1%
2000	234		6.8%
2010	231		−1.3%
2016 (est.)	229		−0.9%
U.S. Decennial Census

As of the census of 2000, there were 234 people, 96 households, and 67 families residing in the town. The population density was 5.4 inhabitants per square mile (2.1/km^{2}). There were 259 housing units at an average density of 6.0 per square mile (2.3/km^{2}). The racial makeup of the town was 93.59% White, 3.42% African American, and 2.99% from two or more races. Hispanic or Latino of any race were 1.28% of the population.

There were 96 households, out of which 32.3% had children under the age of 18 living with them, 58.3% were married couples living together, 4.2% had a female householder with no husband present, and 30.2% were non-families. 25.0% of all households were made up of individuals, and 9.4% had someone living alone who was 65 years of age or older. The average household size was 2.44 and the average family size was 2.93.

In the town, the population was spread out, with 23.1% under the age of 18, 8.1% from 18 to 24, 32.1% from 25 to 44, 24.8% from 45 to 64, and 12.0% who were 65 years of age or older. The median age was 40 years. For every 100 females, there were 116.7 males. For every 100 females age 18 and over, there were 127.8 males.

The median income for a household in the town was $29,028, and the median income for a family was $31,250. Males had a median income of $27,500 versus $23,636 for females. The per capita income for the town was $12,584. About 9.5% of families and 13.9% of the population were below the poverty line, including 7.4% of those under the age of eighteen and 26.3% of those 65 or over.

== Communities and locations in Worth ==
- Bullock Corners – A location in the northwestern corner of Worth, west of Worth village.
- Diamond – A hamlet in the southwestern corner of the town on County Road 95. The community was once called "South Woods".
- Frederick Corners – A hamlet near the western town line at County Roads 93 and 95.
- Lorraine Gulf – A valley in the northwestern part of Worth.
- Seven by Nine Corners – A hamlet in the northeastern corner of the town on County Road 96.
- Stears Corners – A hamlet near the western town line on County Road 96.
- South Sandy Creek – A stream flowing through the northern part of Worth.
- Worth (previously called "Worthville" and "Wilcoxs Corners") – A hamlet on County Road 189 in the northwestern corner of the town.
- Worth Center – A hamlet southeast of Worth village, located on County Road 93.
