= Dexter Universalist Church (Dexter, New York) =

Historic church in New York, United States

- U.S. National Register of Historic Places
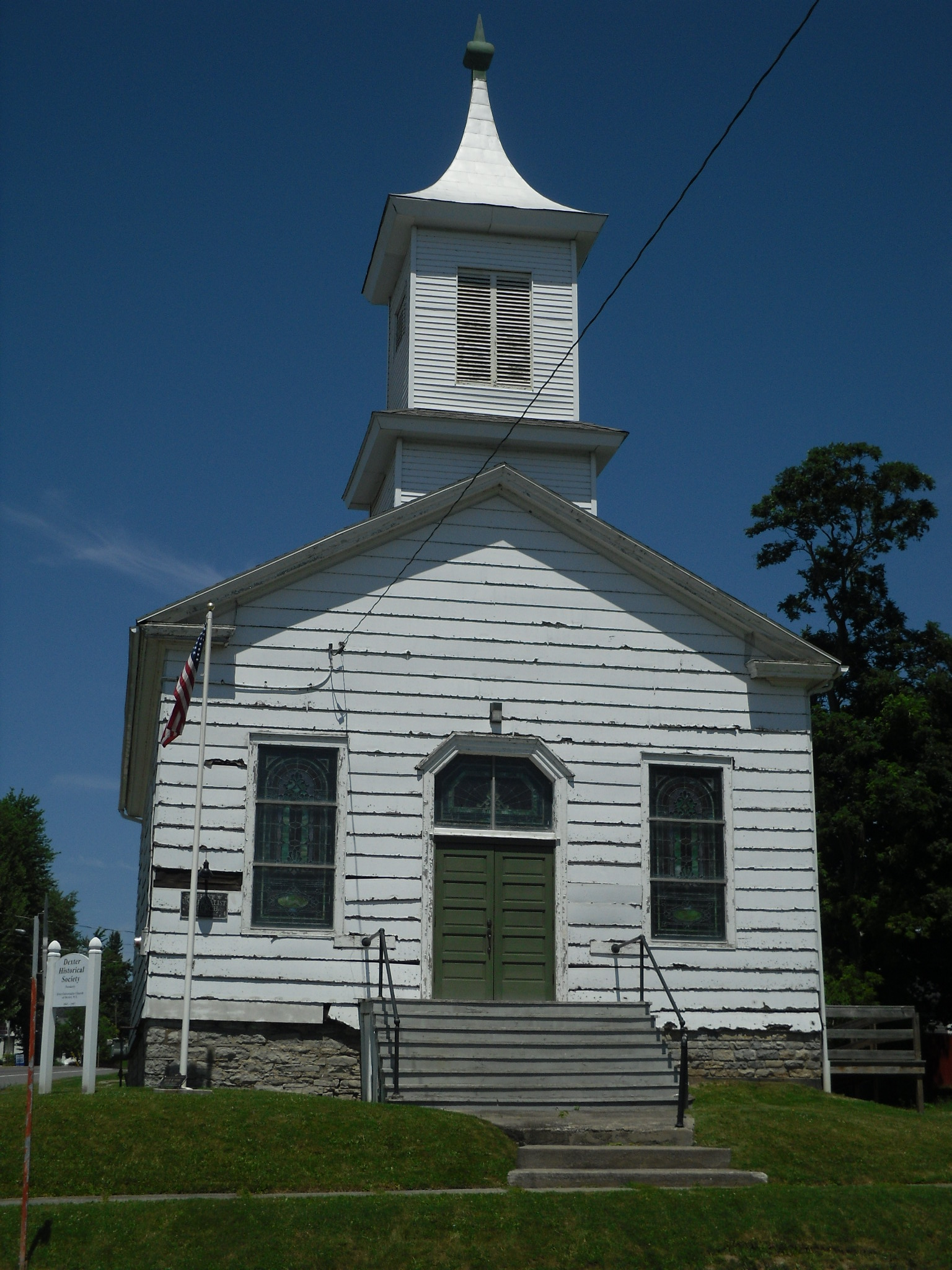

- Location within New York Location within the United States
- Location: Brown and Kirby Sts., Dexter, New York
- Coordinates: 44.0080°N 76.0443°W
- Area: less than one acre
- Built: 1841
- Architectural style: Greek Revival
- NRHP reference No.: 03000249
- Added to NRHP: September 19, 2003

The Dexter Universalist Church, located on the northeast corner of Brown and Kirby Streets in Dexter, New York, is a well-preserved, "modest" Greek Revival-style church that was built in 1841. In a 2002 review of the church, then vacant, it was deemed to retain "a substantial degree of historic integrity with its original form, fabric, and fenestration intact." It has leaded stained glass windows. The church played a role in its community for over 100 years.

The building was listed on the National Register of Historic Places in 2003.

In 2013 is currently used as a museum by the Dexter Historical Society.
