= Brownville (village), New York =

Brownville, New York
- Village
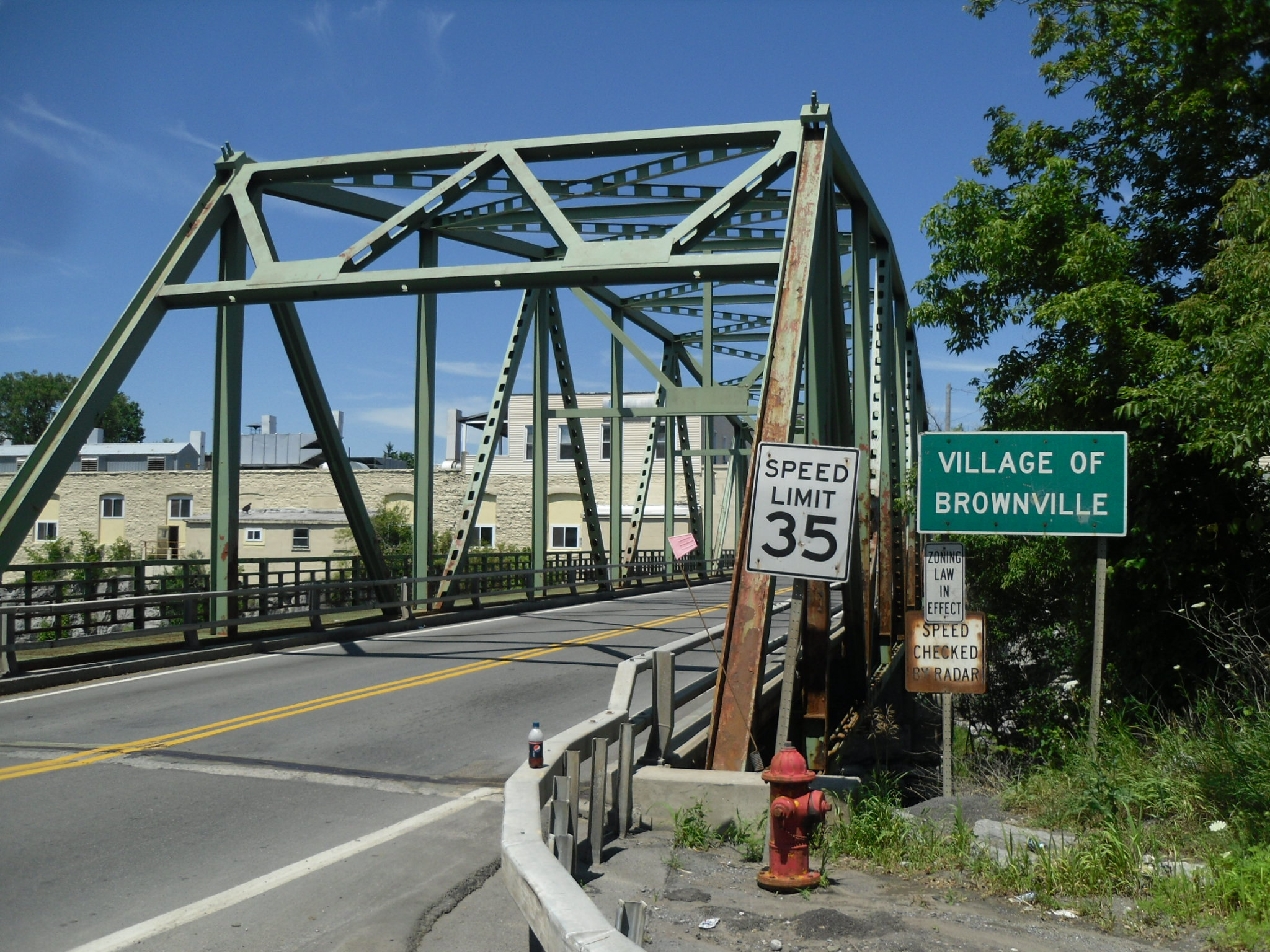
- Entering the village of Brownville on Bridge Street

- Location within New York Location within the United States
- Coordinates: 44°0′20″N 75°58′59″W
- Country: United States
- State: New York
- County: Jefferson
- Town: Brownville

Area
  - Total: 0.64 sq mi (1.65 km^{2})
  - Land: 0.63 sq mi (1.62 km^{2})
  - Water: 0.012 sq mi (0.03 km^{2})
- Elevation: 348 ft (106 m)

Population (2020)
  - Total: 930
  - Density: 1,490.6/sq mi (575.53/km^{2})
- Time zone: UTC-5 (Eastern (EST))
  - Summer (DST): UTC-4 (EDT)
- ZIP code: 13615
- Area code: 315
- FIPS code: 36-10231
- GNIS feature ID: 0944965
- Website: www.villageofbrownvilleny.gov

Brownville is a village in Jefferson County, New York, United States. The population was 1,119 at the 2010 census, up from 1,022 in 2000. The village is named after Jacob Brown, an early settler and developer.

The village is in the southern part of the town of Brownville, west of Watertown.

== History ==
The village is the site of the first settlement in the town in 1799. It was incorporated in 1828.

== Geography ==
Brownville is located in central Jefferson County at 44°0′20″N 75°58′59″W (44.005613, -75.983154). Its southern border is the Black River, which forms the border with the town of Hounsfield. The village is bordered to the east by the village of Glen Park.

According to the United States Census Bureau, the village of Brownville has a total area of 0.68 square miles (1.75 km^{2}), of which 0.004 square miles (0.01 km^{2}), or 0.56%, are water.

Brownville is on New York State Route 12E and County Route 53. NY-12E leads east 5 miles (8 km) to Watertown and northwest 8 miles (13 km) to Chaumont.

== Demographics ==
Historical population
Census	Pop.	Note	%±
1810	400		—
1840	1,000		—
1850	900		−10.0%
1860	621		−31.0%
1870	450		−27.5%
1880	409		−9.1%
1890	666		62.8%
1900	767		15.2%
1910	854		11.3%
1920	976		14.3%
1930	842		−13.7%
1940	907		7.7%
1950	1,013		11.7%
1960	1,082		6.8%
1970	1,187		9.7%
1980	1,099		−7.4%
1990	1,138		3.5%
2000	1,022		−10.2%
2010	1,119		9.5%
2020	930		−16.9%
U.S. Decennial Census

As of the census of 2000, there were 1,022 people, 419 households, and 292 families residing in the village. The population density was 1,576.7 inhabitants per square mile (608.8/km^{2}). There were 447 housing units at an average density of 689.6 per square mile (266.3/km^{2}). The racial makeup of the village was 98.04% White, 0.39% Black or African American, 0.29% Native American, 0.10% Asian, 0.10% Pacific Islander, 0.39% from other races, and 0.68% from two or more races. Hispanic or Latino of any race were 0.68% of the population.

There were 419 households, out of which 32.5% had children under the age of 18 living with them, 55.8% were married couples living together, 10.0% had a female householder with no husband present, and 30.3% were non-families. 26.5% of all households were made up of individuals, and 12.6% had someone living alone who was 65 years of age or older. The average household size was 2.44 and the average family size was 2.94.

In the village, the population was spread out, with 24.6% under the age of 18, 7.2% from 18 to 24, 25.6% from 25 to 44, 26.9% from 45 to 64, and 15.7% who were 65 years of age or older. The median age was 40 years. For every 100 females, there were 85.8 males. For every 100 females age 18 and over, there were 83.6 males.

The median income for a household in the village was $37,500, and the median income for a family was $44,881. Males had a median income of $35,294 versus $25,583 for females. The per capita income for the village was $18,862. About 4.0% of families and 8.4% of the population were below the poverty line, including 10.3% of those under age 18 and 7.0% of those age 65 or over.

== Education ==
The school district is General Brown Central School District.
