= Dexter, New York =

- Village
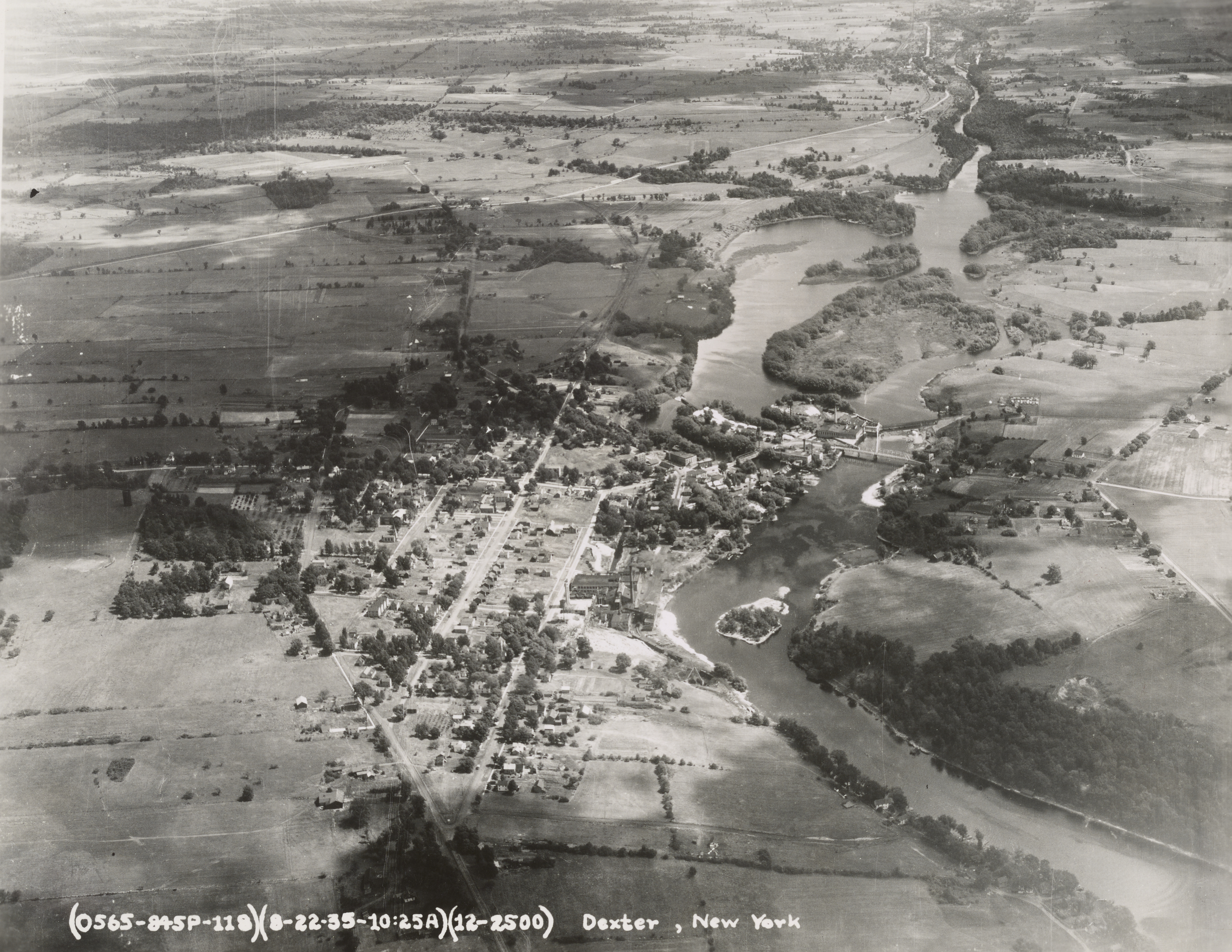
- Dexter in 1935

- Location within New York Location within the United States
- Coordinates: 44°0′30″N 76°2′43″W
- Country: United States
- State: New York
- County: Jefferson
- Town: Brownville

Area
  - Total: 0.72 sq mi (1.86 km^{2})
  - Land: 0.66 sq mi (1.72 km^{2})
  - Water: 0.054 sq mi (0.14 km^{2})
- Elevation: 282 ft (86 m)

Population (2020)
  - Total: 1,004
  - Density: 1,508.6/sq mi (582.48/km^{2})
- Time zone: UTC-5 (Eastern (EST))
  - Summer (DST): UTC-4 (EDT)
- ZIP code: 13634
- Area code: 315
- FIPS code: 36-20500
- GNIS feature ID: 0948392
- Website: www.villageofdexterny.gov

Dexter is a village in Jefferson County, New York, United States. As of the 2020 census, Dexter had a population of 1,004. The name is derived from Simon Newton Dexter, one of the village's stockholders.

Dexter is in the southern part of the town of Brownville and is west of Watertown.

== History ==
The village was formerly called Fish Island and was part of the lands belonging to Jacob and John Brown. The village was renamed Dexter after Simon Newton Dexter.

Dexter became an incorporated village in 1855, with a population of about 528.

The Dexter Universalist Church was listed on the National Register of Historic Places in 2003.

== Geography ==
Dexter is located in west-central Jefferson County at 44°00′30″N 76°02′43″W, in the southern part of the town of Brownville. According to the United States Census Bureau, the village has a total area of 0.8 square miles (2.0 km^{2}), of which 0.7 square miles (1.8 km^{2}) are land and 0.1 square miles (0.2 km^{2}), or 8.39%, are water.

The village is adjacent to the Black River, near Black River Bay, an arm of Lake Ontario. The village is bordered to the south across the river by the town of Hounsfield.

New York State Route 180, a north-south highway, passes through the village, leading north 1.5 miles (2.4 km) to Limerick and south 3.5 miles (5.6 km) to NY-3 near Sackets Harbor. Watertown, the Jefferson county seat, is 7 miles (11 km) to the east via Routes 180 and 12F. County Roads 53 and 59 also serve the community.

== Demographics ==
Historical population
| Census | Pop. | Note | %± |
|---|---|---|---|
| 1880 | 487 | | — |
| 1890 | 737 | | 51.3% |
| 1900 | 945 | | 28.2% |
| 1910 | 1,005 | | 6.3% |
| 1920 | 1,164 | | 15.8% |
| 1930 | 1,020 | | −12.4% |
| 1940 | 1,109 | | 8.7% |
| 1950 | 1,038 | | −6.4% |
| 1960 | 1,009 | | −2.8% |
| 1970 | 1,061 | | 5.2% |
| 1980 | 1,053 | | −0.8% |
| 1990 | 1,030 | | −2.2% |
| 2000 | 1,120 | | 8.7% |
| 2010 | 1,052 | | −6.1% |
| 2020 | 1,004 | | −4.6% |
U.S. Decennial Census

As of the census of 2000, there were 1,120 people, 420 households, and 299 families residing in the village. The population density was 2,704.7 inhabitants per square mile (1,044.3/km^{2}). There were 455 housing units at an average density of 1,098.8 per square mile (424.2/km^{2}). The racial makeup of the village was 97.86% White, 0.27% African American, 0.27% Native American, 0.45% Asian, and 1.16% from two or more races. Hispanic or Latino of any race were 0.62% of the population.

There were 420 households, out of which 37.4% had children under the age of 18 living with them, 48.6% were married couples living together, 17.9% had a female householder with no husband present, and 28.8% were non-families. 24.8% of all households were made up of individuals, and 13.3% had someone living alone who was 65 years of age or older. The average household size was 2.62 and the average family size was 3.10.

In the village, the population was distributed with 28.8% under the age of 18, 8.5% from 18 to 24, 26.7% from 25 to 44, 20.5% from 45 to 64, and 15.4% who were 65 years of age or older. The median age was 36 years. For every 100 females, there were 78.3 males. For every 100 females age 18 and over, there were 74.4 males.

The median income for a household in the village was $33,482, and the median income for a family was $40,000. Males had a median income of $36,875 versus $19,706 for females. The per capita income for the village was $17,138. About 14.2% of families and 14.1% of the population were below the poverty line, including 11.7% of those under age 18 and 24.1% of those age 65 or over.

== Education ==
The school district is General Brown Central School District.
