= Jefferson County, New York =

County in New York, United States

- County
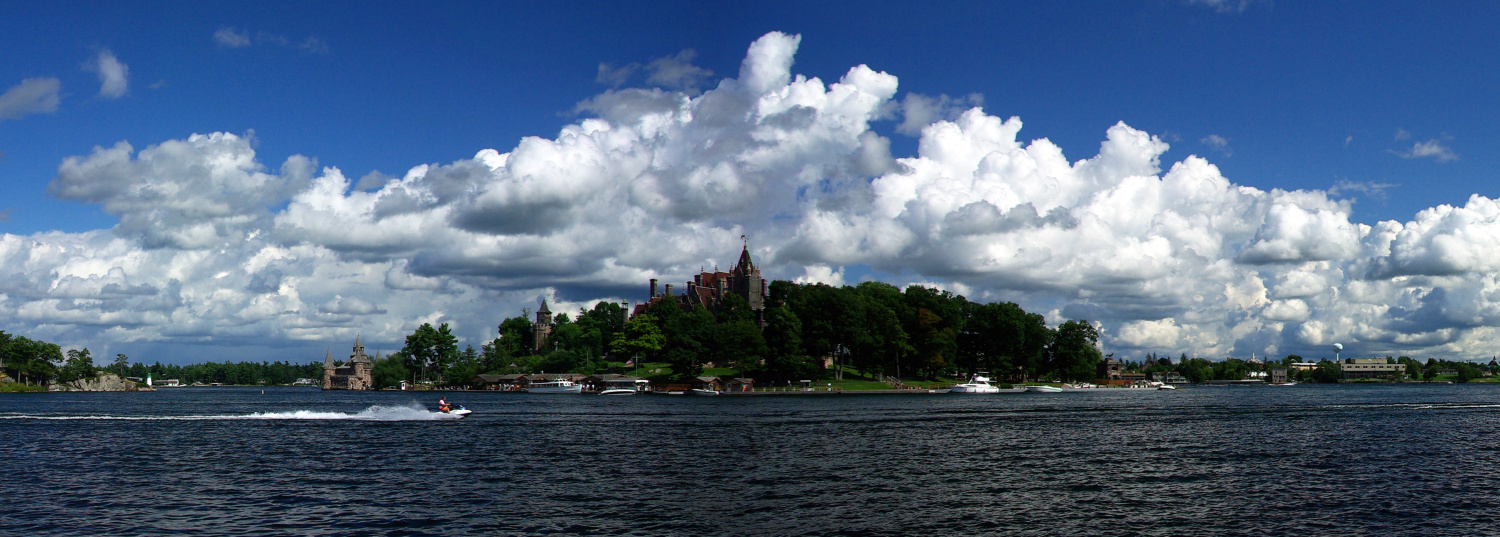
- Panoramic view of Boldt Castle on Heart Island

- Flag Seal

- Location within the U.S. state of New York
- Coordinates: 43°59′N 76°03′W
- Country: United States
- State: New York
- Founded: 1805
- Named for: Thomas Jefferson
- Seat: Watertown
- Largest town: Le Ray

Area
  - Total: 1,857 sq mi (4,810 km^{2})
  - Land: 1,269 sq mi (3,290 km^{2})
  - Water: 589 sq mi (1,530 km^{2}) 32%

Population (2020)
  - Total: 116,721
  - Estimate (2025): 111,540 ▼
  - Density: 63/sq mi (24/km^{2})
- Time zone: UTC−5 (Eastern)
  - Summer (DST): UTC−4 (EDT)
- Congressional districts: 21st, 24th
- Website: www.jeffersoncountyny.gov

Jefferson County is a county on the northern border of the U.S. state of New York. As of the 2020 census, the population was 116,721. Its county seat is Watertown. The county is named after Thomas Jefferson, third President of the United States. It is adjacent to Lake Ontario, southeast from the Canada–US border of Ontario. The county is part of the North Country region of the state.

Jefferson County comprises the Watertown-Fort Drum, NY Metropolitan Statistical Area. The popularity of the area as a summer tourist destination results in a dramatic increase of population during that season.

In 2014, it elected Colleen M. O'Neill as the first woman county sheriff in the state. She had served with the New York State Police for 32 years.

The United States Army's 10th Mountain Division is based at Fort Drum. The base had a total population of nearly 13,000 according to the 2010 census.

== History ==
When counties were established in the Province of New York in 1683, the present Jefferson County was part of Albany County. This was an enormous county, including the northern part of New York State as well as all of the present State of Vermont and, in theory, extending westward to the Pacific Ocean. This county was reduced in size on July 3, 1766, by the creation of Cumberland County, and further on March 16, 1770, by the creation of Gloucester County, both containing territory now in Vermont.

On March 12, 1772, what was left of Albany County was split into three parts, one remaining under the name Albany County. One of the other pieces, Tryon County, contained the western portion (and thus, since no western boundary was specified, theoretically still extended west to the Pacific). The eastern boundary of Tryon County was approximately 5 miles (8.0 km) west of the present city of Schenectady, and the county included the western part of the Adirondack Mountains and the area west of the West Branch of the Delaware River. The area then designated as Tryon County now includes 37 counties of New York State. The county was named for William Tryon, colonial governor of New York.

In the years subsequent to 1776, most of the Loyalists in Tryon County fled to Canada. In 1784, following the peace treaty that ended the American Revolutionary War, the name of Tryon County was changed to Montgomery County to honor the general, Richard Montgomery, who had captured several places in Canada and died attempting to capture the city of Quebec, replacing the name of the hated British governor.

In 1789, the size of Montgomery County was reduced by the creation of Ontario County from Montgomery. The area split off from Montgomery County was much larger than the present county, as it was later divided to form the present Allegany, Cattaraugus, Chautauqua, Erie, Genesee, Livingston, Monroe, Niagara, Orleans, Steuben, Wyoming, Yates, and parts of Schuyler and Wayne counties.

Jefferson County is part of Macomb's Purchase of 1791.

In 1791, Herkimer County was one of three counties split off from Montgomery (the other two being Otsego, and Tioga County). This was much larger than the present county, however, and was reduced by a number of subsequent splits. The first one of these, in 1794, produced Onondaga County. This county was larger than the current Onondaga County, including the present Cayuga and Cortland Counties, and part of Oswego County.

Oneida County (as well as a part of Chenango County), was split off from Herkimer County in 1798.

Jefferson County was split off from Oneida County in 1805. In 1817, Carleton Island, captured from the British in the War of 1812, was annexed to the county. During the late eighteenth and nineteenth centuries, the county was largely developed for agriculture.

By the early 20th centuries, Watertown was a city with the highest per capita number of millionaires in the United States. Local industrialists had made early fortunes from industries driven by water power. Mills were established along the falls of the Black River from the first half of the nineteenth century. In the nineteenth century there was considerable mining in the county, with iron (hematite) being mined at the Sterling Mine (1850s), the Dickson Mine (1858), the Keene Mine, and the Shirtliff Mine (1860); baryte at the Pillar Point Mine; fluorite at Muscalonge Lake (1840s); and calcite at Blackriver. Limestone was quarried at Chaumont, Clayton, Cape Vincent and Watertown. By the end of WWI most mining in Jefferson County had ceased.

In 2019, Jefferson County and much of the rest of the North Country was identified as one of the most politically tolerant communities in America, according to an analysis by PredictWise.

== Geography ==
According to the U.S. Census Bureau, the county has an area of 1,857 square miles (4,810 km^{2}), of which 1,269 square miles (3,290 km^{2}) is land and 589 square miles (1,530 km^{2}) (32%) is water. It is the fourth-largest county in New York by area.

Jefferson County is in New York State's northern lobe, adjacent to the area where the Saint Lawrence River exits Lake Ontario. It is northeast of Syracuse, and northwest of Utica. The county is at the international border with Canada.

The Black River, which empties into Lake Ontario, is an important waterway in the county. Part of the Tug Hill Plateau is in the southern part of the county. The county contains part of the Thousand Islands in the St. Lawrence River, including such large islands as Carleton Island, Grindstone Island, and Wellesley Island.

=== Adjacent counties ===
- St. Lawrence County – northeast
- Lewis County – southeast
- Oswego County – southwest
- Leeds and Grenville United Counties, Ontario – north
- Frontenac County, Ontario – northwest

=== Major highways ===
- Interstate 81
- Interstate 781
- U.S. Route 11
- New York State Route 3
- New York State Route 3A
- New York State Route 12
- New York State Route 12E
- New York State Route 12F
- New York State Route 26
- New York State Route 37
- New York State Route 180

== Demographics ==
Historical population
Census	Pop.	Note	%±
1810	15,140		—
1820	32,952		117.6%
1830	48,493		47.2%
1840	60,984		25.8%
1850	68,153		11.8%
1860	69,825		2.5%
1870	65,415		−6.3%
1880	66,103		1.1%
1890	68,806		4.1%
1900	76,748		11.5%
1910	80,382		4.7%
1920	82,250		2.3%
1930	83,574		1.6%
1940	84,003		0.5%
1950	85,521		1.8%
1960	87,835		2.7%
1970	88,508		0.8%
1980	88,151		−0.4%
1990	110,943		25.9%
2000	111,738		0.7%
2010	116,229		4.0%
2020	116,721		0.4%
2025 (est.)	111,540	▼	−4.4%
U.S. Decennial Census; 1790–1960 1900–1990; 1990–2000 2020

=== 2020 census ===
Jefferson County, New York – Racial and ethnic composition Note: the US Census treats Hispanic/Latino as an ethnic category. This table excludes Latinos from the racial categories and assigns them to a separate category. Hispanics/Latinos may be of any race.
Race / Ethnicity (NH = Non-Hispanic)	Pop 1980	Pop 1990	Pop 2000	Pop 2010	Pop 2020	% 1980	% 1990	% 2000	% 2010	% 2020
White alone (NH)	86,992	100,179	97,389	99,682	92,755	98.69%	90.30%	87.16%	85.76%	79.47%
Black or African American alone (NH)	271	6,200	6,257	5,475	6,271	0.31%	5.59%	5.60%	4.71%	5.37%
Native American or Alaska Native alone (NH)	208	418	500	500	461	0.24%	0.38%	0.45%	0.43%	0.39%
Asian alone (NH)	213	910	1,007	1,464	2,185	0.24%	0.82%	0.90%	1.26%	1.87%
Native Hawaiian or Pacific Islander alone (NH)	x	x	140	273	300	x	x	0.13%	0.23%	0.26%
Other race alone (NH)	92	100	163	121	501	0.10%	0.09%	0.15%	0.10%	0.43%
Mixed race or Multiracial (NH)	x	x	1,605	2,571	6,258	x	x	1.44%	2.21%	5.36%
Hispanic or Latino (any race)	375	3,136	4,677	6,143	7,990	0.43%	2.83%	4.19%	5.29%	6.85%
Total	88,151	110,943	111,738	116,229	116,721	100.00%	100.00%	100.00%	100.00%	100.00%

=== 2000 census ===
As of the census of 2000, there were 111,738 people, 40,068 households, and 28,127 families residing in the county. The population density was 88 inhabitants per square mile (34/km^{2}). There were 54,070 housing units at an average density of 42 units per square mile (16/km^{2}). The county's racial makeup was 88.71% White, 5.83% Black or African American, 0.53% Native American, 0.92% Asian, 0.14% Pacific Islander, 2.05% from other races, and 1.82% from two or more races. 4.19% of the population were Hispanic or Latino of any race. 93.2% spoke English and 3.5% Spanish as their first language.

21.9% were of English, 14.1% Irish, 12.8% German, 8.5% French and 8.5% Italian ancestry according to the 2010 American Community Survey.

There were 40,068 households, of which 37.20% had children under the age of 18 living with them, 55.60% were married couples living together, 10.40% had a female householder with no husband present, and 29.80% were non-families. 24.40% of all households were made up of individuals, and 10.10% had someone living alone who was 65 years of age or older. The average household size was 2.58 and the average family size was 3.07.

26.50% of the county's population was under age 18, 11.80% was from age 18 to 24, 31.30% was from age 25 to 44, 19.10% was from age 45 to 64, and 11.30% were age 65 or older. The median age was 32 years. For every 100 females there were 107.30 males. For every 100 females age 18 and over, there were 108.50 males.

The county's median household income was $34,006, and the median family income was $39,296. Males had a median income of $28,727 versus $21,787 for females. The county's per capita income was $16,202. About 10.00% of families and 13.30% of the population were below the poverty line, including 16.80% of those under age 18 and 9.20% of those age 65 or over.

== Education ==
Jefferson Community College in Watertown provides higher education within the county.

School districts include:

- Alexandria Central School District
- Belleville Henderson Central School District
- Carthage Central School District
- Copenhagen Central School District
- General Brown Central School District
- Gouverneur Central School District
- Hammond Central School District
- Indian River Central School District
- La Fargeville Central School District
- Lyme Central School District
- Sackets Harbor Central School District
- Sandy Creek Central School District
- South Jefferson Central School District
- Thousand Islands Central School District
- Watertown City School District

Some areas on Fort Drum are not in any school district. Fort Drum sends K-12 students in some portions to the Carthage school district, and others to the Indian River school district.

== Communities ==
=== Larger Settlements ===
#	Location	Population	Type	Area
1	Le Ray	25,574	Town	North
2	†Watertown	24,685	City	Center
3	Fort Drum	15,896	CDP	Center
4	Calcium	3,573	CDP	Center
5	Carthage	3,236	Village	Center
6	West Carthage	1,780	Village	Center
7	Clayton	1,705	Village	River Delta
8	Adams	1,633	Village	South
9	Adams Center	1,568	CDP	South
10	Sackets Harbor	1,450	Village	Upper Lakeshore
11	Black River	1,348	Village	Center
12	Philadelphia	1,252	Village	North
13	Brownville	1,119	Village	Center
14	Alexandria Bay	1,078	Village	River Delta
15	Dexter	1,052	Village	Center
16	Theresa	863	Village	North
17	Great Bend	843	CDP	Center
18	Cape Vincent	726	Village	River Delta
19	Antwerp	686	Village	North
20	Chaumont	624	Village	Upper Lakeshore
21	Evans Mills	621	Village	Center
22	††La Fargeville	606	CDP	River Delta
23	Redwood	605	CDP	River Delta
24	Depauville	577	CDP	River Delta
25	Glen Park	502	Village	Center
26	Felts Mills	372	CDP	Center
27	Natural Bridge	365	CDP	North
28	Mannsville	354	Village	South
29	Deferiet	294	Village	Center
30	Pamelia Center	264	CDP	Center
31	Ellisburg	244	Village	South
32	Three Mile Bay	227	CDP	Upper Lakeshore
33	Belleville	226	CDP	South
34	Henderson	224	CDP	South
35	Pierrepont Manor	212	CDP	South
36	Lorraine	174	CDP	South
37	Plessis	164	CDP	North
38	Rodman	153	CDP	South
39	Herrings	116	CDP	Center
40	Oxbow	108	CDP	North
41	Thousand Island Park	96	CDP	River Delta

† - County Seat

†† - Former Village

=== Towns ===
- Adams
- Alexandria
- Antwerp
- Brownville
- Cape Vincent
- Champion
- Clayton
- Ellisburg
- Henderson
- Hounsfield
- Le Ray
- Lorraine
- Lyme
- Orleans
- Pamelia
- Philadelphia
- Rodman
- Rutland
- Theresa
- Watertown
- Wilna
- Worth

=== Hamlet ===
- Sanfords Four Corners

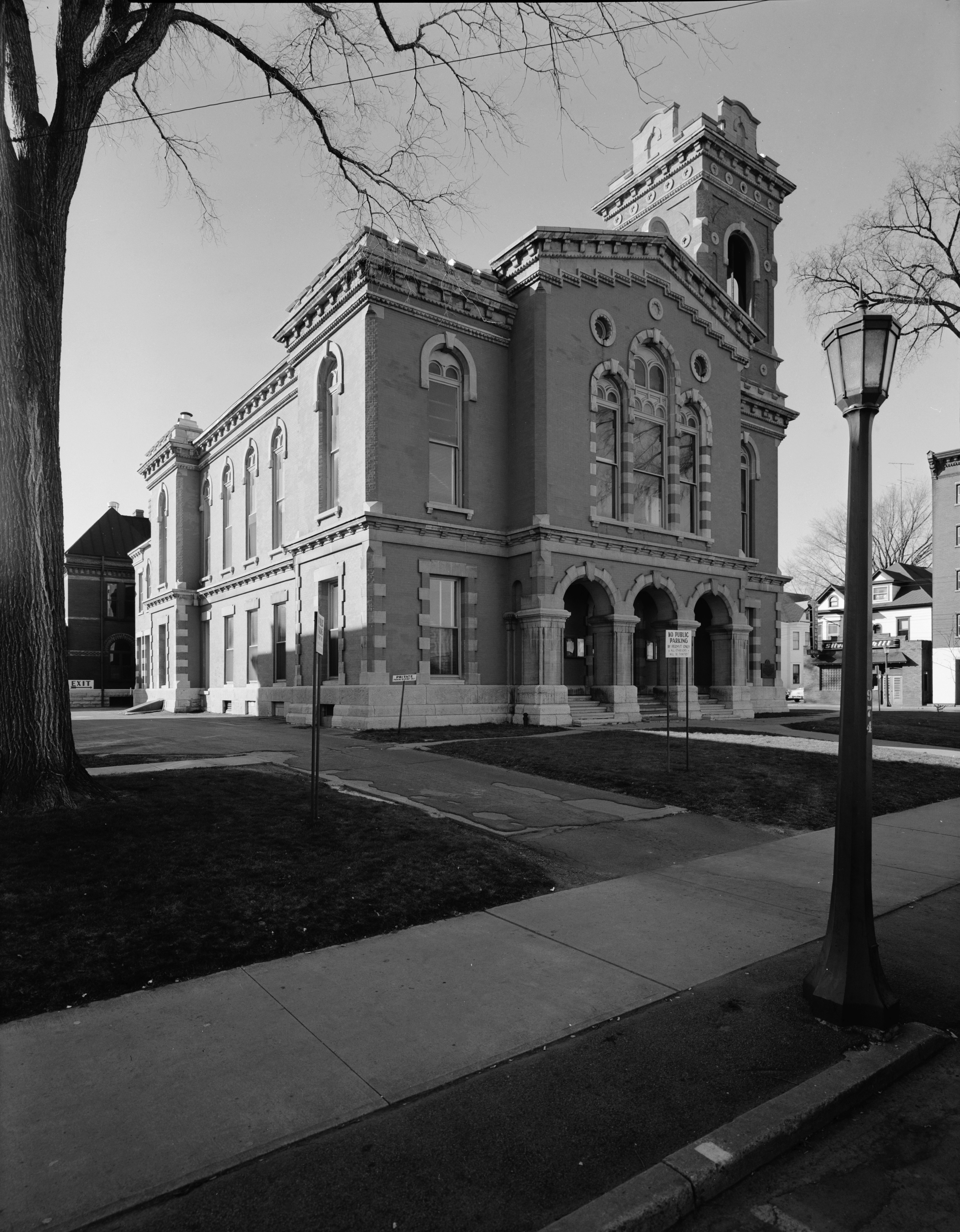
Old Jefferson County Courthouse

== Government and politics ==
Legislative authority is vested in the county Board of Legislators, which consists of 15 members each elected from single member districts for two-year terms. As of 2018, there are 14 Republicans and 1 Democrat.

Jefferson County is reliably Republican. Since 1884, Democrats only carried the county twice, in 1964 and in 1996.

United States presidential election results for Jefferson County, New York
Year	Republican		Democratic		Third party(ies)	
Year	No.	%	No.	%	No.	%
1884	9,029	53.83%	7,075	42.18%	669	3.99%
1888	9,861	54.37%	7,562	41.70%	713	3.93%
1892	9,856	54.32%	7,181	39.57%	1,109	6.11%
1896	11,411	60.88%	6,644	35.45%	689	3.68%
1900	11,870	61.03%	6,776	34.84%	805	4.14%
1904	12,050	60.57%	6,696	33.66%	1,147	5.77%
1908	11,477	57.93%	6,694	33.79%	1,642	8.29%
1912	6,692	37.97%	6,054	34.35%	4,878	27.68%
1916	11,197	58.68%	7,089	37.15%	795	4.17%
1920	22,072	70.74%	7,925	25.40%	1,204	3.86%
1924	21,159	68.38%	7,665	24.77%	2,118	6.85%
1928	26,361	66.41%	12,908	32.52%	426	1.07%
1932	22,760	61.98%	13,478	36.70%	486	1.32%
1936	24,925	63.16%	13,975	35.41%	566	1.43%
1940	25,584	63.54%	14,581	36.22%	97	0.24%
1944	21,834	60.10%	14,449	39.77%	46	0.13%
1948	19,661	58.95%	13,176	39.51%	514	1.54%
1952	27,932	69.88%	12,026	30.09%	13	0.03%
1956	28,429	74.06%	9,959	25.94%	0	0.00%
1960	24,290	60.55%	15,800	39.39%	25	0.06%
1964	10,718	29.84%	25,175	70.10%	21	0.06%
1968	18,552	56.03%	13,438	40.59%	1,119	3.38%
1972	23,123	66.41%	11,629	33.40%	65	0.19%
1976	20,401	59.95%	13,503	39.68%	124	0.36%
1980	16,455	49.67%	13,271	40.06%	3,402	10.27%
1984	23,445	67.96%	10,960	31.77%	91	0.26%
1988	19,304	57.41%	14,137	42.05%	181	0.54%
1992	14,227	38.01%	13,380	35.75%	9,819	26.24%
1996	12,362	36.22%	16,783	49.18%	4,982	14.60%
2000	18,192	49.95%	16,799	46.12%	1,432	3.93%
2004	21,231	54.72%	16,860	43.45%	709	1.83%
2008	20,220	52.00%	18,166	46.72%	500	1.29%
2012	18,122	50.75%	17,099	47.89%	487	1.36%
2016	21,763	56.92%	13,809	36.12%	2,664	6.97%
2020	25,629	58.44%	17,307	39.46%	919	2.10%
2024	26,417	61.33%	16,326	37.90%	333	0.77%

Jefferson County Board of Legislators
District	Legislator	Party	Residence
1	Robert W. Cantwell III	Republican	Cape Vincent
2	William W. Johnson	Republican	Lyme
3	Philip N. Reed, Sr.	Republican	Orleans
4	Allen T. Drake	Democrat	Theresa
5	Michael Montigelli	Republican	Le Ray
6	Daniel R. McBride	Republican	Wilna
7	John D. Peck	Republican	Champion
8	James A. Nabywaniec	Republican	Le Ray
9	Patrick R. Jareo	Republican	Ellisburg
10	Jeremiah J. Maxon	Republican	Adams
11	Robert D. Ferris	Republican	Watertown
12	Francee A. Calarco	Republican	Watertown
13	Scott A. Gray chairman	Republican	Watertown
14	Corey Y. Grant	Republican	Watertown
15	Anthony J. Doldo	Republican	Watertown

== Law enforcement ==
As of 2021 the sheriff is Colleen M. O'Neill. O'Neill is the first female sheriff elected in the state, and was first elected in 2014.

In 2012, the Sheriff's Office was the subject of three unrelated sexual harassment lawsuits by a female deputy and two other women.

== Sites of interest ==
- Antique Boat Museum
- Boldt Castle
- Burnham Point State Park
- Canoe-Picnic Point State Park
- Cape Vincent
- Carleton Island
- Cedar Point State Park
- Clayton
- Dewolf Point State Park
- Duffy Fairgrounds
- Fairview Manor
- Fort Drum
- Grass Point State Park
- Grenadier Island
- Grindstone Island Upper Schoolhouse
- Lake Ontario National Marine Sanctuary
- National Register of Historic Places listings in Jefferson County, New York
- Orleans
- Paddock Arcade
- Paddock Mansion
- Public Square Historic District
- Robert G. Wehle State Park
- Roswell P. Flower Memorial Library
- Sackets Harbor
- Sackets Harbor Battlefield State Historic Site
- Thousand Islands
- Thousand Islands National Park
- Tibbetts Point Lighthouse
- Union Hotel (Sackets Harbor, New York)
- Watertown
- Wellesley Island State Park
- Thousand Islands Arts Center

== See also ==
- List of counties in New York
