= Clayton (village), New York =

Clayton, New York
- Village
- Location within New York Location within the United States
- Coordinates: 44°14′11″N 76°5′7″W
- Country: United States
- State: New York
- County: Jefferson
- Town: Clayton

Area
  - Total: 2.58 sq mi (6.67 km^{2})
  - Land: 1.60 sq mi (4.15 km^{2})
  - Water: 0.97 sq mi (2.52 km^{2})
- Elevation: 276 ft (84 m)

Population (2020)
  - Total: 1,705
  - Density: 1,064.1/sq mi (410.85/km^{2})
- Time zone: UTC-5 (Eastern (EST))
  - Summer (DST): UTC-4 (EDT)
- ZIP code: 13624
- Area code: 315
- FIPS code: 36-16089
- GNIS feature ID: 0946809
- Website: www.villageofclaytonny.gov

Clayton is a village in the town of Clayton in Jefferson County, New York, United States. The village population was 1,705 at the 2020 census.

Clayton is the home of the Antique Boat Museum and Clayton Opera House. The village is a summer resort, offering galleries, boutiques and quality services to summer visitors.

== History ==
The area was originally inhabited by Algonquian tribes, but they were driven out by the Iroquois. Radiocarbon dating of a nearby dig site indicated Clayton was once home to a 2-3 long house, 180 person palisade ringed habitation, circa 1470.

The community was formerly called "French Creek" and "Cornelia". By 1853, the population was 426. Clayton incorporated as a village, by vote of its citizens, in 1872. The arrival of the railroad in 1873 marked a major turning point in the local tourist industry.

The Clayton Historic District and Capt. Simon Johnston House are listed on the National Register of Historic Places.

== Geography ==
According to the United States Census Bureau, the village has a total area of 2.6 square miles (6.7 km^{2}), of which 1.6 square miles (4.2 km^{2}) are land and 0.97 square miles (2.5 km^{2}), or 37.62%, are water. Clayton is located on the south bank of the St. Lawrence River. To the west is French Creek Bay where French Creek enters the St. Lawrence. Opposite the village in the St. Lawrence is Grindstone Island, one of the large islands of the Thousand Islands.

New York State Route 12 intersects New York State Route 12E in the village. NY-12 leads south 22 miles (35 km) to Watertown, the Jefferson county seat, and northeast parallel to the St. Lawrence River 11 miles (18 km) to Alexandria Bay. NY-12E leads southwest along the St. Lawrence 15 miles (24 km) to Cape Vincent.

== Demographics ==
Historical population
Census	Pop.	Note	%±
1870	1,020		—
1880	1,621		58.9%
1890	1,748		7.8%
1900	1,913		9.4%
1910	1,941		1.5%
1920	1,849		−4.7%
1930	1,940		4.9%
1940	1,999		3.0%
1950	1,981		−0.9%
1960	1,996		0.8%
1970	1,970		−1.3%
1980	1,816		−7.8%
1990	2,160		18.9%
2000	1,821		−15.7%
2010	1,978		8.6%
2020	1,705		−13.8%
U.S. Decennial Census

As of the census of 2000, there were 1,821 people, 828 households, and 492 families residing in the village. The population density was 1,123.8 inhabitants per square mile (433.9/km^{2}). There were 1,049 housing units at an average density of 647.4 per square mile (250.0/km^{2}). The racial makeup of the village was 95.83% White, 1.26% Black or African American, 0.55% Native American, 0.49% Asian, 0.16% Pacific Islander, 0.77% from other races, and 0.93% from two or more races. Hispanic or Latino of any race were 2.14% of the population.

There were 828 households, out of which 26.9% had children under the age of 18 living with them, 47.6% were married couples living together, 8.2% had a female householder with no husband present, and 40.5% were non-families. 35.3% of all households were made up of individuals, and 20.9% had someone living alone who was 65 years of age or older. The average household size was 2.19 and the average family size was 2.85.

In the village, the population was spread out, with 22.6% under the age of 18, 7.0% from 18 to 24, 26.2% from 25 to 44, 23.4% from 45 to 64, and 20.9% who were 65 years of age or older. The median age was 41 years. For every 100 females, there were 82.5 males. For every 100 females age 18 and over, there were 80.8 males.

The median income for a household in the village was $31,354, and the median income for a family was $42,208. Males had a median income of $31,094 versus $28,375 for females. The per capita income for the village was $18,247. About 6.3% of families and 11.7% of the population were below the poverty line, including 12.9% of those under age 18 and 12.9% of those age 65 or over.

== Transportation ==
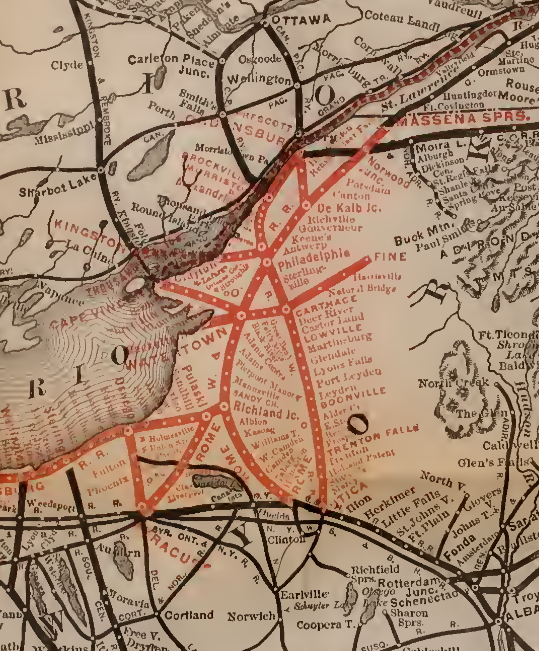
Eastern divisions of the RW&O. Clayton branch fed passenger and freight rail into main line at Philadelphia, NY

Clayton is accessible by automobile via New York State Route 12, which turns east from its northward course in the village. The northern terminus of Route 12E is in the same location. From Interstate 81, it can be reached by taking Exit 50S to Route 12.

Beginning in 1873, the village was served by the Clayton Division of the Rome, Watertown and Ogdensburg Railroad (RW&O), which later became a part of the New York Central network. At its peak, multiple express trains per day ran from Niagara Falls and Grand Central Terminal to bring passengers and freight to Clayton's ferry terminal, which was the gateway to the Thousand Islands region. Facilities included a train yard and locomotive shed. The New York Central passenger trains included direct sleeping car service.

Passenger service to Utica ceased in 1950, with bus service to Watertown remaining. Freight service continued until 1972, after which the tracks were torn out.

The station and ferry terminal were converted into Frink Park, a public venue for performances and mooring for visiting ships, while the rail yards were incorporated into the property of the Frink-America snowplow factory, which was demolished in 2010. The property has since been redeveloped into a hotel, which was finished in 2013. The remainder of the right-of-way within the village is maintained as the Sissy Danforth Rivergate Trail, a multi-use recreational trail maintained by the Thousand Islands Land Trust and the Rivergate Wheelers ATV club.

== Education ==
The school district is the Thousand Islands Central School District.

== See also ==
- NEPCO 140 oil spill
