= List of New York state parks =

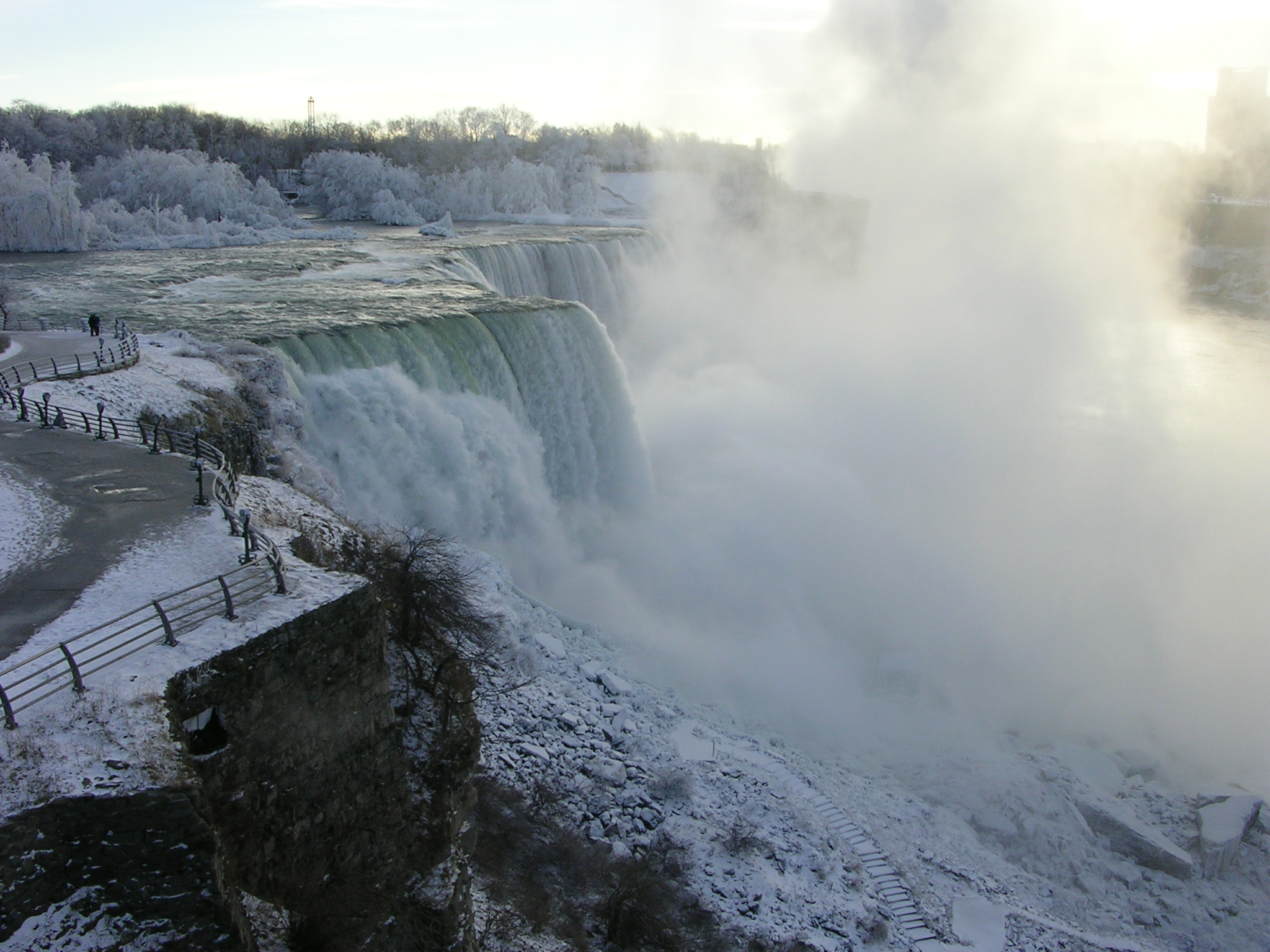
New York's Niagara Falls State Park is the oldest state park in the United States.

This is a list of state parks in the U.S. state of New York. Also listed are state golf courses, seasonal hunting areas, and former state parks.

In New York, state parks are managed by the Office of Parks, Recreation and Historic Preservation (OPRHP), with the exception of the Adirondack and Catskill Parks, which are managed by the Department of Environmental Conservation (DEC). Outside of the Adirondacks and the Catskills, the state parks department is organized into eleven regions:

- Niagara
- Allegany
- Genesee
- Finger Lakes
- Central
- Taconic
- Palisades
- Long Island
- Thousand Islands
- Saratoga/Capital District
- New York City

== Forest preserve ==
The largest parks in New York are the Adirondack Park, at six million acres (24,000 km^{2}; 9,400 sq mi); and the Catskill Park, at 700,000 acres (2,800 km^{2}; 1,100 sq mi). Together they comprise the New York Forest Preserve, properties that must be kept "Forever Wild" according to Article 14 of the New York Constitution. Both parks are managed by DEC; the Adirondack Park is managed by the Adirondack Park Agency, as well.

== State parks ==
New York state parks

OPRHP manages lands designated as state parks in New York, with the aims of providing public space for outdoor recreation while conserving natural and cultural resources. The agency offers the "Empire Passport", which provides unlimited day use vehicle entry to most of New York's state parks and recreational facilities. As of 2017, New York has 215 state parks and historic sites encompassing 350,000 acres. The agency's portfolio also includes 28 golf courses, 35 swimming pools, 67 beaches, and 18 museums and nature centers.

The following sortable tables list current and former New York state parks, respectively, all 'owned' or managed by the OPRHP, as of 2015. Some OPRHP-'owned' parks are managed primarily or in part by other agencies, through lease or partnership agreements. The second table lists five former New York state parks that have been transferred to other entities.

=== State parks ===
Park name	Region	County or counties	Area	Year created	Visitors (2024)	Water bodies	Notes	Image
Allan H. Treman State Marine Park	Finger Lakes	Tompkins	93 acres (38 ha)	1969	355,374	Cayuga Lake	Includes a marina with 430 boat slips, fishing, birdwatching, and picnic tables.	Marina at Allan H. Treman State Marine Park
Allegany State Park	Allegany	Cattaraugus	64,800 acres (26,200 ha)	1921	1,525,695	Allegheny Reservoir, Red House Lake, Quaker Lake	Largest state park in New York. Includes two separate areas developed for recreation, the Red House Area and the Quaker Area, each with cabins and campsites. Both areas include formally designated bird conservation areas.	The Allegany State Park Administration Building as seen from the Red House Picnic Area across Red House Lake.
Amherst State Park	Niagara	Erie	77 acres (31 ha)	2000		Ellicott Creek	Located on the grounds of a former Catholic convent. Operated by the Town of Amherst.	
Amsterdam Beach State Park	Long Island	Suffolk	198 acres (80 ha)	2005	28,453	Atlantic Ocean	Undeveloped except for trails. Operated in conjunction with the Town of East Hampton and Suffolk County.	
Battle Island State Park	Central	Oswego	235 acres (95 ha)	1938	45,590	Oswego River	Includes the 18-hole Battle Island State Park Golf Course. Named for a battle that took place nearby during the French and Indian War in 1756.	
Bayard Cutting Arboretum State Park	Long Island	Suffolk	690 acres (280 ha)	1936	477,232	Connetquot River	Includes a large arboretum designed by Frederick Law Olmsted and the Westbrook mansion designed by Charles C. Haight.	View of the arboretum grounds.
Bayswater Point State Park	New York City	Queens	17 acres (6.9 ha)	1991	16,809	Jamaica Bay	Undeveloped. Previously home to a large mansion, now destroyed. Presently hosts passive recreation while preserving shorebird habitat.	
Bear Mountain State Park	Palisades	Rockland	5,277 acres (2,136 ha)	1913	2,853,697	Hudson River	Managed in conjunction with the Palisades Interstate Park Commission.	View of the stone and wood Bear Mountain Inn after renovations.
Beaver Island State Park	Niagara	Erie	952 acres (385 ha)	1935	312,673	Niagara River	Located on Grand Island. Includes a USGA-recognized championship 18-hole public golf course.	View of the beach at Beaver Island State Park.
Beechwood State Park	Finger Lakes	Wayne	288 acres (117 ha)	1999	1,179	Lake Ontario	Undeveloped. Previously the site of a Girl Scout camp. Managed by the Town of Sodus since 2010.	
Belmont Lake State Park	Long Island	Suffolk	463 acres (187 ha)	1926	1,082,334	Belmont Lake	Day-use only. Formerly hosted the headquarters of the Long Island State Park Commission.	View of Belmont Lake.
Bethpage State Park	Long Island	Nassau, Suffolk	1,477 acres (598 ha)	1934	782,887		Includes five golf courses, including the Bethpage Black Course, which hosted the 2002 and 2009 U.S. Open Golf Championships.	Clubhouse at Bethpage State Park
Betty and Wilbur Davis State Park	Central	Otsego	223 acres (90 ha)	2001	12,047		Features full-service cabins and trails through meadows and forest.	
Barcelona Lighthouse	Allegany	Chautauqua		2008	9,082	Lake Erie	Includes the keeper's house, light tower, and property around these structures.	Barcelona Light
Blauvelt State Park	Palisades	Rockland	639 acres (259 ha)	1913	32,657		Undeveloped. Former location of Camp Bluefields, a rifle range used to train members of the New York National Guard prior to World War I. Managed in conjunction with the Palisades Interstate Park Commission.	
Bonavista State Park Golf Course	Finger Lakes	Seneca	247 acres (100 ha)	1970	4,861 (2023)	Seneca Lake	Includes a nine-hole golf course.	
Bowman Lake State Park	Central	Chenango	653 acres (264 ha)	1966	72,235	Bowman Lake	Features one of the largest campgrounds in central New York, containing 188 campsites for tents and trailers, as well as several rustic cabins.	
Braddock Bay State Park	Genesee	Monroe	387 acres (157 ha)	1956	19,270	Lake Ontario	Popular birdwatching location; park is adjacent to the 2,125-acre (8.60 km^{2}) Braddock Bay Fish and Wildlife Management Area. Leased and maintained by the Town of Greece.	
Brentwood State Park	Long Island	Suffolk	52 acres (21 ha)	2003	889,105		An athletic field complex with eight soccer fields and two baseball fields on artificial turf.	
Bristol Beach State Park	Palisades	Ulster	134 acres (54 ha)	1967	10,914	Hudson River	Undeveloped. Managed in conjunction with the Palisades Interstate Park Commission.	
Brookhaven State Park	Long Island	Suffolk	1,638 acres (663 ha)	1971	71,672		Protects a large area of the Long Island Pine Barrens and contains scattered wetlands.	
Buckhorn Island State Park	Niagara	Erie	895 acres (362 ha)	1935	41,137	Niagara River	Managed as a preserve with space for passive recreational uses such as biking, hiking and fishing. Includes a bird conservation area.	Woods Creek is the west boundary of Buckhorn Island State Park.
Buffalo Harbor State Park	Niagara	Erie	190 acres (77 ha)	2015	269,734	Lake Erie	Features a 1,000 slip marina and is part of an overall initiative to revitalize Buffalo's outer harbor.	
Burnham Point State Park	Thousand Islands	Jefferson	12 acres (4.9 ha)	1898	16,520	St. Lawrence River	Primarily offers space to camp, including 47 tent and trailer sites, 19 of which contain electrical hookups.	
Buttermilk Falls State Park	Finger Lakes	Tompkins	811 acres (328 ha)	1924	386,370	Buttermilk Creek	Features several waterfalls and wooded gorges.	Buttermilk Falls
Caleb Smith State Park Preserve	Long Island	Suffolk	545 acres (221 ha)	1963	100,916	Nissequogue River	Managed as a nature preserve. Includes the Wyandanch Club Historic District.	Caleb Smith House
Camp Hero State Park	Long Island	Suffolk	754 acres (305 ha)	2002	353,285	Atlantic Ocean	Occupies a portion of the former Montauk Air Force Station.	Former gun emplacement at Camp Hero State Park
Canadarago State Marine Park	Central	Otsego	1.2 acres (0.49 ha)	1960	17,151	Canadarago Lake	Offers boat launch facilities to allow access to Canadarago Lake.	
Canandaigua Lake State Marine Park	Finger Lakes	Ontario	15 acres (6.1 ha)	1969	60,636	Canandaigua Lake	Offers boat launch facilities to allow access to Canandaigua Lake.	
Canoe-Picnic Point State Park	Thousand Islands	Jefferson	70 acres (28 ha)	1897	9,451	St. Lawrence River	Accessible only by boat. Offers a campground with tent sites.	
Captree State Park	Long Island	Suffolk	343 acres (139 ha)	1954	1,413,046	Great South Bay, Fire Island Inlet	Home to "The Captree Fleet", Long Island's largest public fleet of charter boats, available for fishing, scuba diving, sightseeing and excursion tours.	Charter fishing boats at Captree State Park
Catharine Valley Trail	Finger Lakes	Schuyler, Chemung	218 acres (88 ha)	2000			Encompasses a planned 12-mile (19 km) recreation trail that follows abandoned railroad grades and canal towpaths between Watkins Glen and Horseheads.	
Caumsett State Historic Park Preserve	Long Island	Suffolk	1,520 acres (620 ha)	1961	980,410	Long Island Sound	Includes the former estate house of Marshall Field III, built in 1925 and among the largest of Long Island's Gold Coast Mansions; also includes a bird conservation area.	Winter Cottage at Caumsett State Historic Park Preserve
Cayuga Lake State Park	Finger Lakes	Seneca	141 acres (57 ha)	1927	221,353	Cayuga Lake	Offers amenities including a beach, boat launch, and a campground.	
Cedar Island State Park	Thousand Islands	St. Lawrence	10 acres (4.0 ha)	1898	1,806	St. Lawrence River	Accessible only by boat. Offers dockage, a day-use area and a small campground.	
Cedar Point State Park	Thousand Islands	Jefferson	48 acres (19 ha)	1898	80,023	St. Lawrence River	Includes a campground, beach, and boat launch.	
Chenango Valley State Park	Central	Broome	1,112 acres (450 ha)	1927	300,470	Chenango River, Chenango Lake, Lily Lake	Offers a beach, campground, cabins, and 18-hole golf course.	
Cherry Plain State Park	Saratoga/Capital District	Rensselaer	175 acres (71 ha)	1962	40,325	Black River, West Brook	Offers a beach, fishing, and camping at 30 sites. Located adjacent to the 4,153-acre (16.81 km^{2}) Capital District Wildlife Management Area, which offers additional hiking and recreation.	
Chimney Bluffs State Park	Finger Lakes	Wayne	597 acres (242 ha)	1963	80,507	Lake Ontario	Features dramatically carved 150-foot-tall (46 m) shoreside cliffs formed from eroded drumlins. Lightly developed for day-use only.	View of Chimney Bluffs from below
Chittenango Falls State Park	Central	Madison	195 acres (79 ha)	1922	152,283	Chittenango Creek	Day-use only. Features a 167-foot (51 m) waterfall. Also home to the endemic and endangered Chittenango ovate amber snail.	Chittenango Falls
Clarence Fahnestock State Park	Taconic	Putnam, Dutchess	15,731 acres (6,366 ha)	1929	316,772	Canopus Lake	Includes the Taconic Outdoor Education Center. Offers a beach, fishing, and camping. Dedicated winter recreation facilities available seasonally.	A view of Clarence Fahnestock Memorial State Park in Autumn.
Clark Reservation State Park	Central	Onondaga	378 acres (153 ha)	1926	180,916	Glacier Lake	Centered around the former plunge pool of a large ice age-era waterfall. Harbors the largest U.S. population of the endangered American hart's tongue fern.	Glacier Lake and the cliff of the fossil waterfall in September
Clay Pit Ponds State Park Preserve	New York City	Richmond	265 acres (107 ha)	1977	23,529		Managed as a nature preserve to protect wetlands, ponds, sand barrens, spring-fed streams, and forest on Staten Island. Includes a bird conservation area.	
Cold Spring Harbor State Park	Long Island	Suffolk	50 acres (20 ha)	2000	293,002		Day-use only. Comprises steep wooded slopes and intended to retain a natural character. Allows passive recreation such as hiking, snowshoeing, and cross-country skiing. Linked to Bethpage State Park by the linear Trail View State Park.	
Coles Creek State Park	Thousand Islands	St. Lawrence	1,800 acres (730 ha)		77,118	St. Lawrence River	Offers a beach, marina, and a campground with 232 tent and trailer sites.	
Conesus Lake Boat Launch	Genesee	Livingston	3 acres (1.2 ha)		40,719	Conesus Lake	Offers a boat launch, fishing access, and picnic tables.	
Connetquot River State Park Preserve	Long Island	Suffolk	3,473 acres (1,405 ha)	1973	239,530	Connetquot River	Home to the Long Island Environmental Interpretive Center. Managed to preserve wildlife habitat; allows for passive recreation such as hiking and fishing.	
Crab Island State Park	Thousand Islands	Clinton	40 acres (16 ha)	1988		Lake Champlain	Undeveloped. Obtained by New York State to prevent development of an historic site and cemetery associated with the War of 1812.	View of Crab Island from Plattsburgh, New York
Croil Island State Park	Thousand Islands	St. Lawrence	796 acres (322 ha)			St. Lawrence River	Undeveloped. Maintained by the NYS Office of Parks, Recreation and Historic Preservation and owned by the New York Power Authority.	
Cumberland Bay State Park	Thousand Islands	Clinton	350 acres (140 ha)	1932	79,556	Lake Champlain	Offers a 2,700-foot (820 m) sand beach, playing fields, and a campground.	
Darien Lakes State Park	Genesee	Genesee	1,845 acres (747 ha)	1965	84,535	Harlow Lake	Functions primarily as a campground, with additional features including a beach, fishing, and hiking trails.	View of Harlow Lake at Darien Lakes State Park
De Veaux Woods State Park	Niagara	Niagara	51 acres (21 ha)	2001	86,115		Originally part of the campus for DeVeaux College for Orphans and Destitute Children, which closed in 1972. Includes recreational facilities and a parcel of old growth forest.	
Deans Cove Boat Launch	Finger Lakes	Seneca	10 acres (4.0 ha)		36,314	Cayuga Lake		
Delta Lake State Park	Central	Oneida	720 acres (290 ha) (formerly 400 acres (160 ha))	1962	294,205	Delta Reservoir	Offers a beach, boat launch, campground, and hiking.	
Devil's Hole State Park	Niagara	Niagara	42 acres (17 ha)	1924	357,807	Niagara River	Overlooks the Niagara River gorge.	
Dewolf Point State Park	Thousand Islands	Jefferson	13 acres (5.3 ha)	1898	10,029	St. Lawrence River	Located on Wellesley Island. Offers a boat launch, dock, and campsites.	
Donald J. Trump State Park	Taconic	Westchester, Putnam	435 acres (176 ha)	2006			Undeveloped. Land donated by and named for Donald Trump after development plans failed. Development and maintenance ceased in 2010.	Entrance sign to Donald J. Trump State Park
Earl W. Brydges Artpark State Park	Niagara	Niagara	197 acres (80 ha)	1974	301,523		Serves as an exhibition space for outdoor sculpture, as well as a concert venue.	
Eel Weir State Park	Thousand Islands	St. Lawrence	16 acres (6.5 ha)		7,419	Oswegatchie River	Offers a small campground, fishing, and trails.	
Evangola State Park	Niagara	Erie	733 acres (297 ha)	1954	378,706	Lake Erie	Offers a campground, playing fields, and trails.	The beach at Evangola State Park.
Fair Haven Beach State Park	Finger Lakes	Cayuga	1,141 acres (462 ha)	1928	374,106	Lake Ontario	Includes the Springbrook Greens State Golf Course	
Fillmore Glen State Park	Finger Lakes	Cayuga	941 acres (381 ha)	1925	114,500		Known for its several waterfalls. Also offers camping.	The Cowsheds, a waterfall at Fillmore Glen State Park.
Fort Niagara State Park	Niagara	Niagara	504 acres (204 ha)	1948	830,538	Niagara River, Lake Ontario	Historic Fort Niagara is located within the park.	Entrance to Fort Niagara State Park
Four Mile Creek State Park	Niagara	Niagara	248 acres (100 ha)	1961	97,479	Lake Ontario		
Franklin D. Roosevelt State Park	Taconic	Westchester	761 acres (308 ha)	1957	537,926	Crom Pond, Mohansic Lake	Day use only. Includes a large pool and two lakes.	
Franklin D. Roosevelt Four Freedoms Park	New York City	New York	4 acres (1.6 ha)	2012	323,020	East River		Monument within Franklin D. Roosevelt Four Freedoms Park
Franny Reese State Park	Palisades	Ulster	251 acres (102 ha)	2009		Hudson River	Day use only. Managed by Scenic Hudson.	
Galop Island State Park	Thousand Islands	St. Lawrence	675 acres (273 ha)			St. Lawrence River	Undeveloped.	
Gantry Plaza State Park	New York City	Queens	10 acres (4.0 ha)	1998	3,005,182	East River, Anable Basin	Recently developed day-use park highlighting structures from Long Island City's industrial past.	Gantry Plaza State Park's gantries, as seen from Pier 4.
Genesee Valley Greenway	Genesee	Monroe, Livingston, Wyoming, Allegany	1,364 acres (552 ha)	1984	137,842	Genesee River	A 90-mile (140 km) trail following the routes of former canals and railways between Rochester and Cuba, with a planned extension to Hinsdale.	Intersection of the Genesee Valley Greenway with the Lehigh Valley Trail.
Gilbert Lake State Park	Central	Otsego	1,586 acres (642 ha)	1926	163,999	Gilbert Lake		
Gilgo State Park	Long Island	Suffolk	1,223 acres (495 ha)	1928	123,431	Atlantic Ocean, Great South Bay	Undeveloped.	
Glimmerglass State Park	Central	Otsego	593 acres (240 ha)	1963	203,879	Otsego Lake		The covered bridge at Glimmerglass State Park.
Golden Hill State Park	Niagara	Niagara	510 acres (210 ha)	1962	51,967	Lake Ontario		
Goosepond Mountain State Park	Palisades	Orange	1,706 acres (690 ha)	1960	23,935	Seely Brook	Undeveloped. Managed by the Palisades Interstate Park Commission.	A boardwalk through the marshes at Goosepond Mountain State Park.
Grafton Lakes State Park	Saratoga/Capital District	Rensselaer	2,545 acres (1,030 ha)	1971	311,276	Long Pond, Second Pond, Shaver Pond, Mill Pond, Martin-Durham Reservoir	Includes a bird conservation area.	
Grass Point State Park	Thousand Islands	Jefferson	114 acres (46 ha)	1926	53,287	St. Lawrence River		
Green Lakes State Park	Central	Onondaga	1,957 acres (792 ha)	1928	1,477,931	Green Lake, Round Lake	Includes the Green Lakes State Park Golf Course and a bird conservation area.	Green Lake, seen from its eastern shore.
Hallock State Park Preserve	Long Island	Suffolk	225 acres (91 ha)	2006	39,586	Long Island Sound	Undeveloped.	
Hamlin Beach State Park	Genesee	Monroe	1,287 acres (521 ha)	1938	381,859	Lake Ontario		View of the beach at Hamlin Beach State Park.
Harriet Hollister Spencer State Recreation Area	Finger Lakes	Ontario	1,589 acres (643 ha)	1962	61,392			Picnic area at Harriet Hollister Spencer State Recreation Area.
Harriman State Park	Palisades	Orange, Rockland	47,527 acres (19,233 ha)	1910	1,725,516	Lake Sebago, Lake Tiorati, Lake Kanawauke, Pine Meadow Lake		Lake Kanawauke within Harriman State Park
Hart's Brook Nature Preserve	Taconic	Westchester	123 acres (50 ha)	1999			Wildlife preserve with trails, administered jointly with Westchester County, and the Town of Greenburgh	
Haverstraw Beach State Park	Palisades	Rockland	73 acres (30 ha)	1911	23,580	Hudson River		
Heckscher State Park	Long Island	Suffolk	1,657 acres (671 ha)	1929	1,390,767	Great South Bay		Dunes at Heckscher State Park
Helen L. McNitt State Park	Central	Madison	134 acres (54 ha)	1999		Cazenovia Lake	Undeveloped.	
Hempstead Lake State Park	Long Island	Nassau	784 acres (317 ha)	1928	802,463	Hempstead Lake		Peninsula Boulevard as it runs beneath a pedestrian bridge at Hempstead Lake State Park.
High Tor State Park	Palisades	Rockland	691 acres (280 ha)	1943	60,694			View from atop High Tor Mountain.
Highland Lakes State Park	Palisades	Orange	3,115 acres (1,261 ha)	1964	26,574		Undeveloped. Managed in conjunction with the Palisades Interstate Park Commission.	
Higley Flow State Park	Thousand Islands	St. Lawrence	1,115 acres (451 ha)	1936	32,984	Raquette River		
Hither Hills State Park	Long Island	Suffolk	1,755 acres (710 ha)	1924	665,218	Atlantic Ocean	Includes a bird conservation area.	Hither Hills State Park headquarters.
Honeoye Lake Boat Launch State Park	Finger Lakes	Ontario	9 acres (3.6 ha)		48,748	Honeoye Lake		
Hook Mountain State Park	Palisades	Rockland	676 acres (274 ha)	1911	55,315		Undeveloped.	View of the Hudson River from Hook Mountain State Park.
Hudson Highlands State Park	Taconic	Dutchess, Putnam, Westchester	8,900 acres (3,600 ha)	1970	501,370	Hudson River	Includes a bird conservation area.	Hudson Highlands State Park at its lowest point along the Hudson River.
Hudson River Islands State Park	Saratoga/Capital District	Columbia, Greene	235 acres (95 ha)			Hudson River		
Hudson River Park	New York City	New York	550 acres (220 ha)	1998		North River		Hudson River Park with the Empire State Building in the background.
Iona Island State Park	Palisades	Rockland	134 acres (54 ha)	1965		Hudson River	Undeveloped.	Aerial view of Iona Island.
Irondequoit Bay State Marine Park	Genesee	Monroe	44 acres (18 ha)	1970	26,163	Irondequoit Bay		
Jacques Cartier State Park	Thousand Islands	St. Lawrence	461 acres (187 ha)		35,065	St. Lawrence River		
James Baird State Park	Taconic	Dutchess	655 acres (265 ha)	1939	227,292		Day use only. Offers trails, an 18-hole golf course, and a sports complex that includes facilities for softball, volleyball, basketball, and tennis.	The golf course and clubhouse at James Baird State Park.
Jay Estate	Taconic	Westchester	23.0 acres (9.3 ha)	1992	54,403	Long Island Sound	Joint ownwership with Westchester County and the non-profit Jay Heritage Center. Operated and maintained by the Jay Heritage Center. Centerpiece of the National Historic Landmark Boston Post Road Historic District. Historic tours and conservation programs.	View of Jay Meadow
John Boyd Thacher State Park	Saratoga/Capital District	Albany	2,482 acres (1,004 ha)	1914	676,226			The base of a cliff along the Indian Ladder Trail at John Boyd Thacher State Park.
Jones Beach State Park	Long Island	Nassau	2,413 acres (977 ha)	1929	9,534,725	Atlantic Ocean, Zach's Bay	Includes the Jones Beach State Park Pitch and Putt Course	Jones Beach at sunset.
Joseph Davis State Park	Niagara	Niagara	388 acres (157 ha)	1964	146,305	Niagara River	Includes a bird conservation area.	
Keewaydin State Park	Thousand Islands	Jefferson	282 acres (114 ha)	1962	46,203	St. Lawrence River		
Keuka Lake State Park	Finger Lakes	Yates	621 acres (251 ha)	1961	153,929	Keuka Lake		Looking north over Keuka Lake from Keuka Lake State Park.
Knox Farm State Park	Niagara	Erie	633 acres (256 ha)	2001	626,516	Cazenovia Creek		Farm buildings at Knox Farm State Park.
Kring Point State Park	Thousand Islands	Jefferson	61 acres (25 ha)	1898	53,394	St. Lawrence River		
Lake Erie State Park	Allegany	Chautauqua	355 acres (144 ha)	1928	90,188	Lake Erie		
Lake Lauderdale State Park	Saratoga/Capital District	Washington	117 acres (47 ha)	1968		Lake Lauderdale	Managed by Washington County since the late 1980s as a county park under a long-term lease agreement with the state.	
Lake Superior State Park	Palisades	Sullivan	1,410 acres (570 ha)	1967	14,266	Lake Superior		
Lake Taghkanic State Park	Taconic	Columbia	1,569 acres (635 ha)	1929	193,774	Lake Taghkanic		
Lakeside Beach State Park	Genesee	Orleans	744 acres (301 ha)	1962	103,332	Lake Ontario		View of Lake Ontario along the shore of Lakeside Beach State Park.
Letchworth State Park	Genesee	Livingston, Wyoming	14,427 acres (5,838 ha)	1906	1,067,525	Genesee River	Includes a bird conservation area.	The gorge and Middle Falls at Letchworth State Park.
Lock 32 State Canal Park	Genesee	Monroe	9 acres (3.6 ha)	1978		Erie Canal		
Lodi Point State Park	Finger Lakes	Seneca	12 acres (4.9 ha)	1963	65,534	Seneca Lake		
Long Point State Park - Finger Lakes	Finger Lakes	Cayuga	297 acres (120 ha)	1963	63,484	Cayuga Lake		
Long Point State Park - Thousand Islands	Thousand Islands	Jefferson	23 acres (9.3 ha)	1913	36,210	Lake Ontario		
Long Point State Park on Lake Chautauqua	Allegany	Chautauqua	360 acres (150 ha)	1956	151,943	Chautauqua Lake		
Macomb Reservation State Park	Thousand Islands	Clinton	600 acres (240 ha)	1968	115,323	Salmon River		
Margaret Lewis Norrie State Park	Taconic	Dutchess	352 acres (142 ha)	1934	203,730	Hudson River	Includes a bird conservation area.	Entrance to Margaret Lewis Norrie State Park.
Mark Twain State Park and Soaring Eagles Golf Course	Finger Lakes	Chemung	464 acres (188 ha)		24,571		Includes the Soaring Eagles Golf Course	
Mary Island State Park	Thousand Islands	Jefferson	13 acres (5.3 ha)	1897	698	St. Lawrence River		
Max V. Shaul State Park	Saratoga/Capital District	Schoharie	70 acres (28 ha)	1959	14,560	Panther Creek, Schoharie Creek		Max V. Shaul State Park's entrance.
Mexico Point State Park	Central	Oswego	122 acres (49 ha)			Lake Ontario, Little Salmon River	Operated and developed since 1992 by the Town of Mexico.	
Mexico Point Boat Launch	Central	Oswego	20 acres (8.1 ha)		19,340	Lake Ontario, Little Salmon River		
Midway State Park	Allegany	Chautauqua	43 acres (17 ha)	2007	115,843	Chautauqua Lake		Carousel at Midway State Park.
Mine Kill State Park	Saratoga/Capital District	Schoharie	500 acres (200 ha)	1973	111,800	Blenheim-Gilboa Reservoir, Schoharie Creek		Mine Kill Falls at Mine Kill State Park.
Miner Lake State Park	Thousand Islands	Clinton	700 acres (280 ha)			Miner Lake	Not a functioning park. Land is managed by the Ganienkeh Mohawk community since 1977.	
Minnewaska State Park Preserve	Palisades	Ulster	23,974 acres (9,702 ha)	1987	619,476	Lake Minnewaska, Lake Awosting, Mud Pond	Includes a bird conservation area.	Lake Minnewaska at Minnewaska State Park Preserve.
Montauk Downs State Park	Long Island	Suffolk	171 acres (69 ha)	1978	93,077		Includes the Montauk Downs State Park Golf Course	Montauk Downs State Park entrance.
Montauk Point State Park	Long Island	Suffolk	862 acres (349 ha)	1924	1,247,933	Atlantic Ocean, Lake Munchogue (Oyster Pond), Block Island Sound		Sunrise over the Montauk Point Light in Montauk Point State Park.
Moreau Lake State Park	Saratoga/Capital District	Saratoga	4,531 acres (1,834 ha)	1967	380,968	Moreau Lake	Includes a bird conservation area.	Moreau Lake at Moreau Lake State Park.
Napeague State Park	Long Island	Suffolk	1,364 acres (552 ha)	1978	100,652	Atlantic Ocean, Gardiners Bay, Block Island Sound	Undeveloped.	Dunes at Napeague State Park.
Newtown Battlefield State Park	Finger Lakes	Chemung	372 acres (151 ha)	1911	34,455			Monument to the Battle of Newtown.
Niagara Falls State Park	Niagara	Niagara	221 acres (89 ha)	1885	9,515,959	Niagara River		The American Falls within Niagara Falls State Park.
Nissequogue River State Park	Long Island	Suffolk	521 acres (211 ha)	2000	268,294	Nissequogue River	Includes a bird conservation area.	The mouth of the Nissequogue River.
Nyack Beach State Park	Palisades	Rockland	61 acres (25 ha)	1911	156,262	Hudson River		Path along the Hudson River at Nyack Beach State Park
Oak Orchard State Marine Park	Genesee	Orleans	81 acres (33 ha)		11,185	Lake Ontario, Oak Orchard Creek		
Ogden Mills & Ruth Livingston Mills State Park	Taconic	Dutchess	630 acres (250 ha)		203,730	Hudson River	Includes the Dinsmore Golf Course and a bird conservation area.	View of the Hudson River from Ogden Mills & Ruth Livingston Mills State Park.
Old Croton Aqueduct State Historic Park	Taconic	Westchester	216 acres (87 ha)	1968	1,282,362			
Old Erie Canal State Historic Park	Central	Madison, Oneida, Onondaga	1,191 acres (482 ha)		155,694	Erie Canal		The Old Erie Canal and its towpath within Old Erie Canal State Historic Park.
Oquaga Creek State Park	Central	Broome, Delaware, Chenango	1,385 acres (560 ha)		71,423	Arctic Lake		Arctic Lake at Oquaga Creek State Park.
Orient Beach State Park	Long Island	Suffolk	364 acres (147 ha)	1929	135,043	Gardiners Bay, Orient Harbor, Long Beach Bay		Entrance to Orient Beach State Park.
Peebles Island State Park	Saratoga/Capital District	Saratoga, Albany	142 acres (57 ha)	1973	74,717	Mohawk River, Hudson River		iew of the Mohawk River from Peebles Island State Park.
Pixley Falls State Park	Central	Oneida	375 acres (152 ha)	1924	85,492	Lansing Kill		Pixley Falls
Planting Fields Arboretum	Long Island	Suffolk	400 acres (160 ha)	1915	348,094			
Point Au Roche State Park	Thousand Islands	Clinton	856 acres (346 ha)	1975	165,400	Lake Champlain		
Reservoir State Park	Niagara	Niagara	132 acres (53 ha)	1962	139,438	Lewiston Reservoir		
Riverbank State Park	New York City	New York	28 acres (11 ha)	1993	4,250,463	Hudson River		Riverbank State Park as seen from across the Hudson River.
Robert Moses State Park (Long Island)	Long Island	Suffolk	875 acres (354 ha)	1908	3,937,825	Atlantic Ocean, Fire Island Inlet	Includes the Robert Moses State Park Pitch and Putt Course	A life boat on the beach at Robert Moses State Park.
Robert Moses State Park (Thousand Islands)	Thousand Islands	St. Lawrence	2,322 acres (940 ha)	1958	131,493	St. Lawrence River		Picnic tables along the Saint Lawrence River in Robert Moses State Park.
Robert V. Riddell State Park	Central	Otsego	2,322 acres (940 ha)	2005		Schenevus Creek, Mud Lake	Allows for passive recreation including hiking, snowshoeing, cross-country skiing, and fishing.	
Robert H. Treman State Park	Finger Lakes	Tompkins	1,257 acres (509 ha)	1920	210,543	Enfield Creek		Waterfalls at Robert H. Treman State Park.
Robert G. Wehle State Park	Thousand Islands	Jefferson	1,067 acres (432 ha)	2004	75,842	Lake Ontario		
Roberto Clemente State Park	New York City	Bronx	24 acres (9.7 ha)	1973	456,713	Harlem River	The first New York state park established in an urban setting. Originally named Harlem River State Park. Includes swimming pools, sports fields, and picnic areas.	
Rock Island Lighthouse State Park	Thousand Islands	Jefferson	4 acres (1.6 ha)	1976	11,524	St. Lawrence River	Accessible only by boat. Visitors may tour the Rock Island Light and a museum maintained in the former keeper's quarters.	Rock Island Light.
Rockefeller State Park Preserve	Taconic	Westchester	1,486 acres (601 ha)	1983	427,359	Pocantico River	"A National Audubon Society Important Bird Area"	The Pocantico River within Rockefeller State Park Preserve.
Rockland Lake State Park	Palisades	Rockland	1,080 acres (440 ha)	1958	710,559	Rockland Lake	Includes the Rockland Lake State Park Golf Course and a bird conservation area.	
St. Lawrence State Park Golf Course	Thousand Islands	St. Lawrence	316 acres (128 ha)		9,386	St. Lawrence River	Includes golf course	
Sampson State Park	Finger Lakes	Seneca	2,070 acres (840 ha)	1960	221,575	Seneca Lake		Seneca Lake from Sampson State Park.
Sandy Island Beach State Park	Central	Oswego	227 acres (92 ha)	2006	25,106	Lake Ontario, North Sandy Pond		Sandy Island Beach State Park's main beach in July.
Saratoga Lake State Boat Launch	Saratoga/Capital District	Saratoga	4 acres (1.6 ha)		61,324	Saratoga Lake		
Saratoga Spa State Park	Saratoga/Capital District	Saratoga	2,379 acres (963 ha)	1909	3,934,026	Geyser Creek	Includes the Saratoga Spa State Park Golf Course and a bird conservation area.	The Geyser Island Spouter at Saratoga Spa State Park.
Schodack Island State Park	Saratoga/Capital District	Rensselaer, Greene, Columbia	1,060 acres (430 ha)	2002	225,347	Hudson River	Includes a bird conservation area.	Schodack Island State Park's boat launch area.
Schunnemunk State Park	Palisades	Orange	2,910 acres (1,180 ha)	2003	53,589		Undeveloped except for hiking trails.	
Selkirk Shores State Park	Central	Oswego	980 acres (400 ha)		85,248	Lake Ontario	Includes a bird conservation area.	
Seneca Lake State Park	Finger Lakes	Seneca	141 acres (57 ha)	1957	179,400	Seneca Lake		Seneca Lake State Park's marina.
Shadmoor State Park	Long Island	Suffolk	66 acres (27 ha)	2000	131,318	Atlantic Ocean		World War II-era observation bunker at Shadmoor State Park.
Shirley Chisholm State Park	New York City	Kings	407 acres (165 ha)	2019	254,351	Jamaica Bay, Hendrix Creek		
Silver Lake State Park	Genesee	Wyoming	776 acres (314 ha)		36,971	Silver Lake		
Sojourner Truth State Park	Palisades	Ulster	508 acres (206 ha)	2022	48,970	Hudson River	Dedicated on February 28, 2022	
Sonnenberg Gardens & Mansion State Historic Park	Finger Lakes	Ontario	50 acres (20 ha)	2005	35,735			Sonnenberg Mansion
Southwick Beach State Park	Thousand Islands	Jefferson	541 acres (219 ha)	1966	158,212	Lake Ontario		Beach and bathers at Southwick Beach State Park.
State Park at the Fair	Central	Onondaga	1 acre (0.40 ha)	1974	868,745		Open during the Great New York State Fair, this state park is billed as New York's smallest. It simulates a park-like setting within the fairgrounds and includes exhibits focused on New York's state parks and historic sites.	
Sterling Forest State Park	Palisades	Orange	22,180 acres (8,980 ha)	1998	311,248	Sterling Lake, Greenwood Lake	Includes a bird conservation area.	
Stony Brook State Park	Finger Lakes	Steuben	568 acres (230 ha)	1928	119,834	Stony Brook		Waterfall at Stony Brook State Park.
Storm King State Park	Palisades	Orange	1,972 acres (798 ha)	1922	51,608	Hudson River	Undeveloped except for hiking trails and limited parking. Includes the summit of Storm King Mountain.	Storm King mountain as viewed from top of Break Neck Ridge
Strawberry Island State Park	Niagara	Erie	8 acres (3.2 ha)	1989		Niagara River	Undeveloped. Managed as a fish and wildlife preserve.	
Sunken Meadow State Park	Long Island	Suffolk	1,288 acres (521 ha)	1926	3,528,980	Long Island Sound	Also known as Governor Alfred E. Smith State Park. Includes the Sunken Meadow State Park Golf Course	Boardwalk at the beachfront at Sunken Meadow State Park.
Sunset Bay State Marine Park	Allegany	Chautauqua			35,104	Cattaraugus Creek	Includes a marina, fishing, birdwatching, and parking.	Marina at Sunset Bay State Marine Park
Taconic State Park – Copake Falls area	Taconic	Columbia	3,064 acres (1,240 ha)		374,006			Entrance to the Copake Falls Area on NY 344.
Taconic State Park – Rudd Pond area	Taconic	Dutchess	4,492 acres (1,818 ha)		38,905	Rudd Pond		
Tallman Mountain State Park	Palisades	Rockland	687 acres (278 ha)	1928	378,155	Hudson River		Tallman Mountain State Park as viewed from Piermont.
Taughannock Falls State Park	Finger Lakes	Tompkins	750 acres (300 ha)	1925	795,833	Cayuga Lake, Taughannock Creek		Taughannock Falls
Thompson's Lake State Park	Saratoga/Capital District	Albany	308 acres (125 ha)	1961	75,643	Thompson's Lake		
Three Falls State Park	Finger Lakes	Tompkins	90 acres (36 ha)	2026		Cayuga Lake		
Trail View State Park	Long Island	Nassau, Suffolk	454 acres (184 ha)	2002	343,150			Entrance sign at Trail View State Park
Two Rivers State Park Recreation Area	Finger Lakes	Tioga	573 acres (232 ha)	2005		Dry Brook	Undeveloped except for hiking trails.	
Valley Stream State Park	Long Island	Nassau	97 acres (39 ha)	1928	419,338	Valley Stream		Entrance to Valley Stream State Park.
Verona Beach State Park	Central	Oneida	1,735 acres (702 ha)	1944	265,217	Oneida Lake		Autumn scenery on the hiking trails of Verona Beach State Park.
Walkway Over the Hudson State Historic Park	Taconic	Dutchess, Ulster	17 acres (6.9 ha)	2009	633,155 (2023)	Hudson River		The Walkway Over the Hudson shortly after its opening.
Waterson Point State Park	Thousand Islands	Jefferson	6 acres (2.4 ha)	1898	607	St. Lawrence River		
Watkins Glen State Park	Finger Lakes	Schuyler	778 acres (315 ha)	1906	1,398,473	Glen Creek		Rainbow Bridge and Falls at Watkins Glen State Park.
Wellesley Island State Park	Thousand Islands	Jefferson	2,636 acres (1,067 ha)	1951	180,952	St. Lawrence River	Includes the Wellesley Island State Park Golf Course	View from the shore of Wellesley Island in Wellesley Island State Park.
Westcott Beach State Park	Thousand Islands	Jefferson	319 acres (129 ha)	1946	134,834	Lake Ontario		
Whetstone Gulf State Park	Thousand Islands	Lewis	2,100 acres (850 ha)	1929	158,806	Whetstone Reservoir		Whetstone Creek in Whetstone Gulf State Park.
Whirlpool State Park	Niagara	Niagara	109 acres (44 ha)	1928	453,643	Niagara River		
Wildwood State Park	Long Island	Suffolk	772 acres (312 ha)	1925	499,848	Long Island Sound		
Wilson-Tuscarora State Park	Niagara	Niagara	485 acres (196 ha)	1965	219,932	Lake Ontario		
Wonder Lake State Park	Taconic	Putnam	1,145 acres (463 ha)	1998		Wonder Lake, Laurel Pond		Wonder Lake
Woodlawn Beach State Park	Niagara	Erie	107 acres (43 ha)	1996	258,054	Lake Erie	Operated since 2011 by the Town of Hamburg through a ten-year partnership agreement with New York State.	

=== Former parks ===
Park name	Region	County or counties	Area	Year created	Year ended	Water bodies	Notes	Image
Empire – Fulton Ferry State Park	New York City	Kings	9 acres (3.6 ha)	1977	2010	East River	Transferred to the Brooklyn Bridge Park Development Corporation to become part of Brooklyn Bridge Park.	Empire-Fulton Ferry section of Brooklyn Bridge Park, looking north.
Frenchman Island State Park	Central	Oswego	26 acres (11 ha)		2009	Oneida Lake	Undeveloped. Transferred to the New York State Department of Environmental Conservation to be managed as a Wildlife Management Area.	
Hunts Pond State Park	Central	Chenango	235 acres (95 ha)		2011	Hunts Pond	Transferred to the New York State Department of Environmental Conservation in 2011 to be managed as part of Hunts Pond State Forest.	
Mohawk River State Park	Saratoga/Capital District	Schenectady	113 acres (46 ha)	2006	2024	Mohawk River	Undeveloped except for hiking trails. Sold to the town of Niskayuna.	
Pinnacle State Park and Golf Course	Finger Lakes	Steuben	714 acres (289 ha)		2022		Transferred to the New York State Department of Environmental Conservation in 2022 to be managed as part of McCarthy Hill State Forest	View of the Canisteo River valley from Pinnacle State Park.

== State golf courses ==
The NYS OPRHP maintains two state golf courses in addition to the courses noted above:

- Indian Hills State Golf Course (Finger Lakes Region), an 18-hole course in Painted Post, New York
- Sag Harbor State Golf Course (Long Island Region), a nine-hole facility within the Barcelona Neck Natural Resources Management Area, East Hampton, New York

== Seasonal hunting ==
New York state parks and historic sites where some type of hunting is permitted on a seasonal basis are listed below. A state license appropriate for that type of hunting is required; some sites also require park permits to hunt.

- Allegany
- Bonavista (limited to bow hunting)
- Bowman Lake
- Buttermilk Falls (limited to bow hunting)
- Cherry Plain
- Chimney Bluff
- Clarence Fahnestock (limited to bow hunting)
- Clermont (limited to bow hunting)
- Coles Creek (limited to bow hunting and muzzle loader)
- Connecticut Hills (limited to bow hunting)
- Darien Lakes
- Fillmore Glen (limited to bow hunting and muzzle loader)
- Ganondagon (limited to bow hunting)
- Gilbert Lake (limited to bow hunting)
- Grafton Lakes
- Harriet Hollister Spencer
- Higley Flow (limited to bow hunting and muzzle loader)
- Hither Hills
- Hudson Highlands
- Hudson River Islands
- Hunts Point
- Jacques Cartier (limited to bow hunting and muzzle loader)
- John Boyd Thacher
- Keuka Lake (limited to bow hunting and muzzle loader)
- Lake Superior
- Lake Taghkanic (limited to bow hunting)
- Letchworth
- Long Point (Cayuga County)
- Mark Twain (limited to bow hunting)
- Mine Kill
- Minnewaska
- Montauk Point
- Moreau Lake
- Napeague (limited to bow hunting)
- Newton Battlefield (limited to bow hunting)
- Oquaga Creek
- Pinnacle (limited to bow hunting and muzzle loader)
- Pixley Falls
- Robert H. Treman (limited to bow hunting)
- Sampson
- Schodack Island
- Silver Lake
- Sterling Forest
- Stony Brook (limited to bow hunting)
- Storm King
- Taconic (Rudd Pond and Copake Falls)
- Taughannock Falls (limited to bow hunting)
- Verona Beach (limited to bow hunting)
- Watkins Glen (limited to bow hunting)
- Wellesley Island (limited to bow hunting and muzzle loader)
- Whetstone Gulf (limited to bow hunting and muzzle loader)

== See also ==
- Adirondack Park Agency
- Geography of New York
- List of New York City parks
- List of trails on Long Island
- New York City Department of Parks and Recreation
- New York State Canalway Trail
- New York State Department of Environmental Conservation
- Palisades Interstate Park Commission
