= Bonavista State Park Golf Course =

Park and golf course in New York state, U.S.

- Location within New York
- Interactive map of Bonavista State Park Golf Course
- Type: State park
- Location: 7194 County Road 132, Ovid, New York
- Coordinates: 42°40′31″N 76°51′50″W
- Area: 247 acres (1.00 km^{2})
- Operator: New York State Office of Parks, Recreation and Historic Preservation
- Visitors: 1,117 (in 2020)
- Open: April to November
- Website: Bonavista State Park Golf Course

Bonavista State Park Golf Course is a 247-acre (1.00 km^{2}) state park and golf course located in the Town of Ovid, just west of the Village of Ovid, New York, United States. The park is located between Sampson State Park and Seneca Lake State Park and overlooks Seneca Lake.

== Park description ==
Bonavista State Park's property was once farmland, and was farmed by residents of the Willard Asylum for the Chronic Insane. The golf course contains apple and pear trees that remain from the farm's orchard.

The park features a nine-hole golf course, which can allow for an 18-hole round by playing each hole from different tees. The park also includes a clubhouse, restaurant, picnic areas, and a snack bar.

== See also ==
- List of New York state parks
