= Point Au Roche State Park =

State park in Clinton County, New York

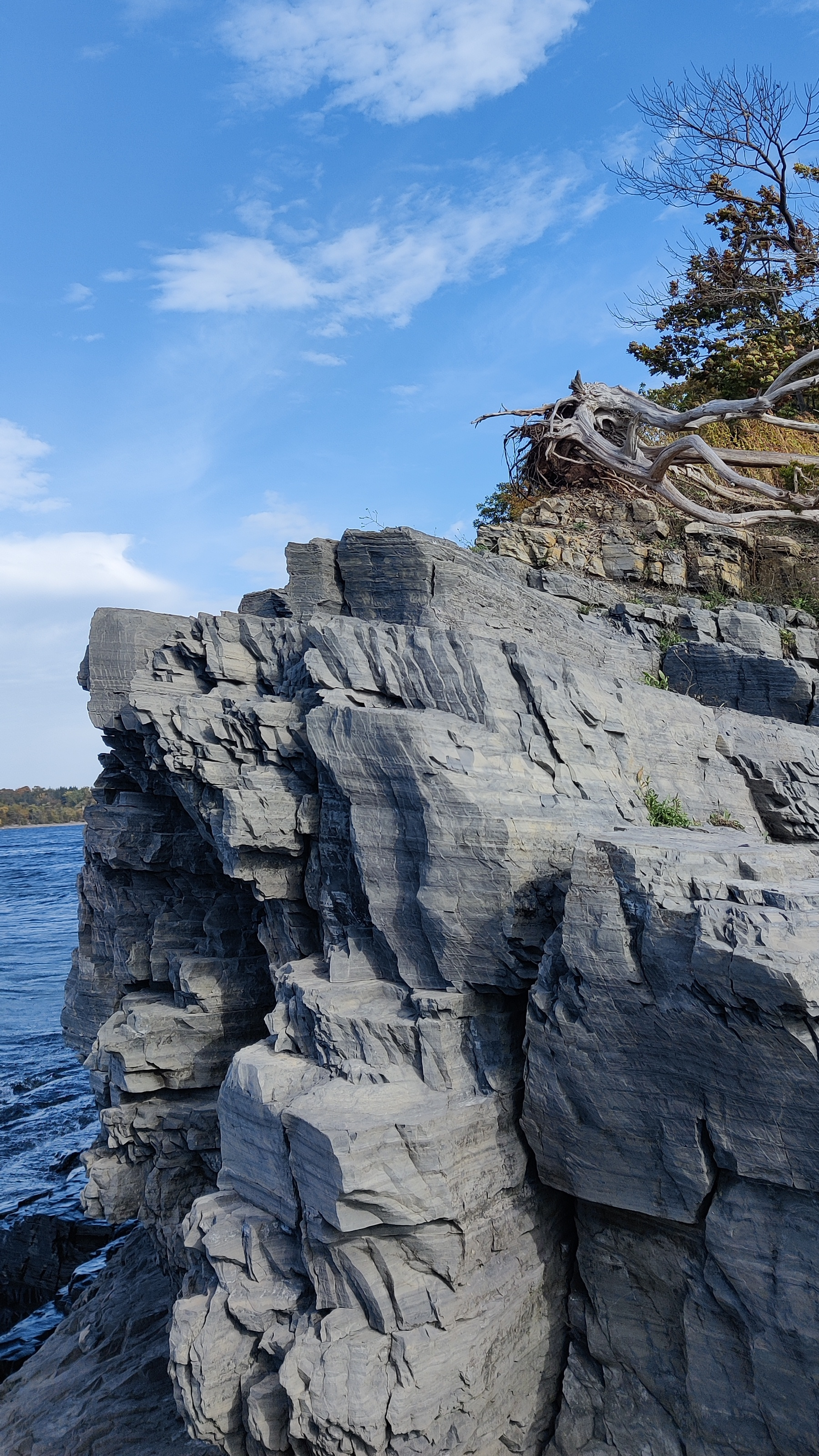
- Point Au Roche State Park, 2022

- Location within New York
- Type: State park
- Location: 19 Camp Red Cloud Road; Plattsburgh, New York
- Coordinates: 44°46′44″N 73°23′24″W
- Area: 856 acres (3.46 km^{2})
- Operator: New York State Office of Parks, Recreation and Historic Preservation
- Visitors: 74,730 (in 2014)
- Open: All year
- Website: parks.ny.gov/parks/30/details.aspx

Point Au Roche State Park is an 856-acre (3.46 km^{2}) state park in Clinton County, New York. The park is in the eastern part of the Town of Beekmantown, on the shore of Lake Champlain.

== History ==
Prior to its designation as a state park, Point Au Roche was used as pasture or cropland, and as a military encampment for cadets during World War One. In the 1950s, a theme park named Fantasy Kingdom operated in the vicinity of the beach area. The area known as Long Point was used for nearly 50 years as a private camping area called Camp Red Cloud. St. Armand's beach was operated by the Town of Beekmantown as a bathing beach for local residents. The site of this park was acquired by the state in 1972.

== Facilities ==
Point Au Roche State Park is a day-use park, offering a playground, picnic areas, biking paths, hiking trails, cross-country skiing, fishing, a nature center, and a sandy beach. Mooring for up to 60 boats is available in Deep Bay.

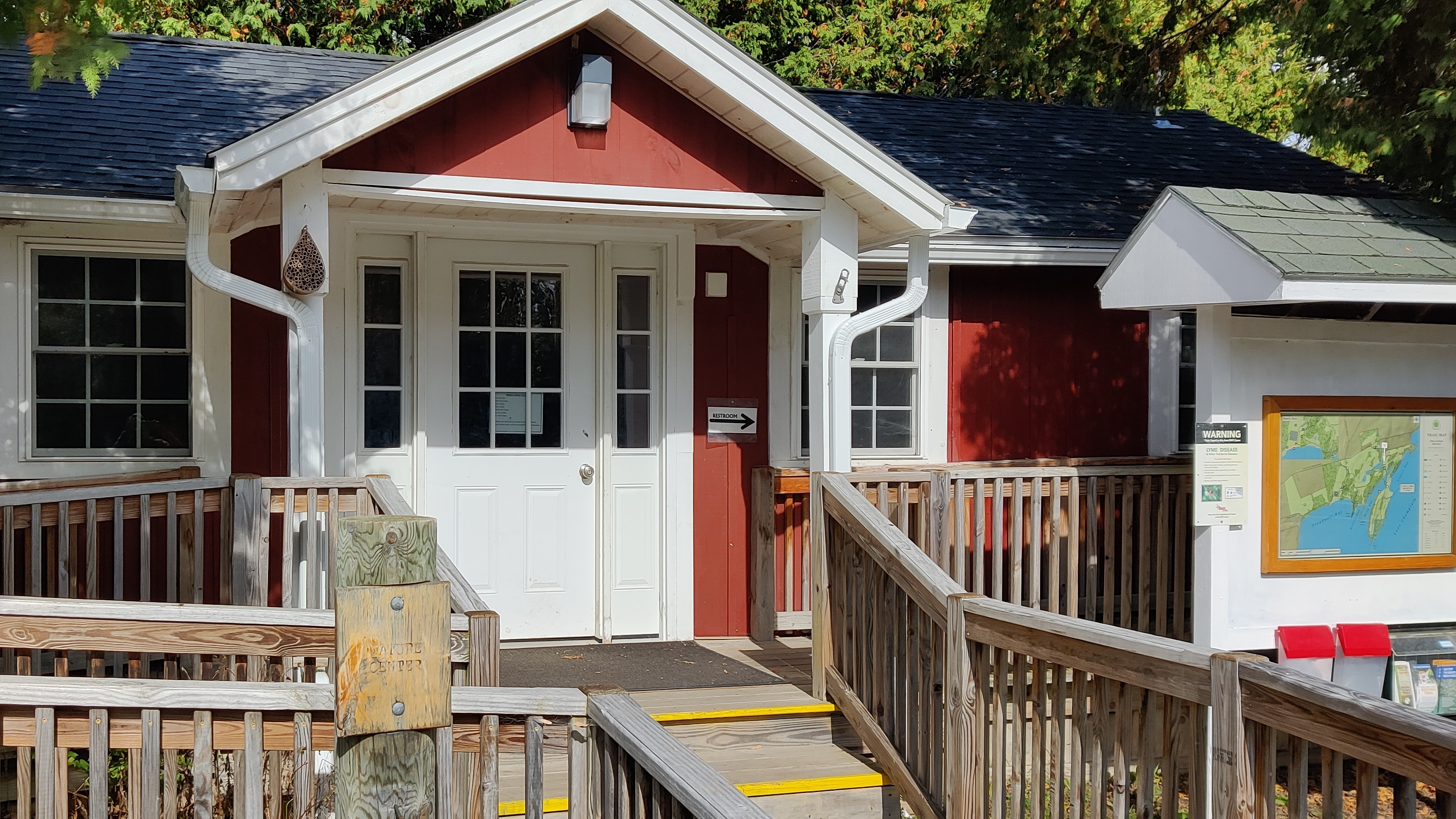
Visitor Center Point au Roche

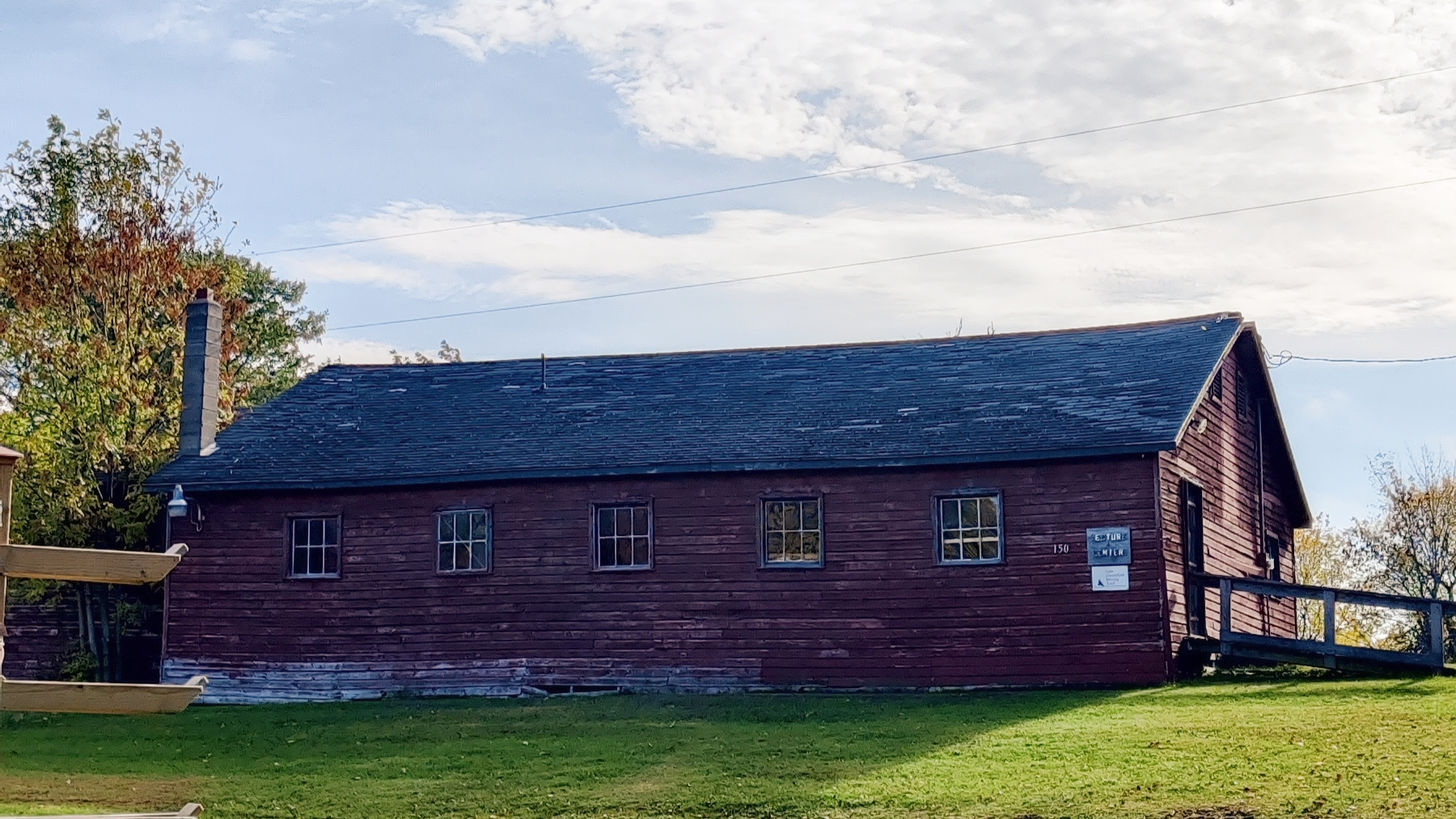
Boathouse in Point au Roche state park
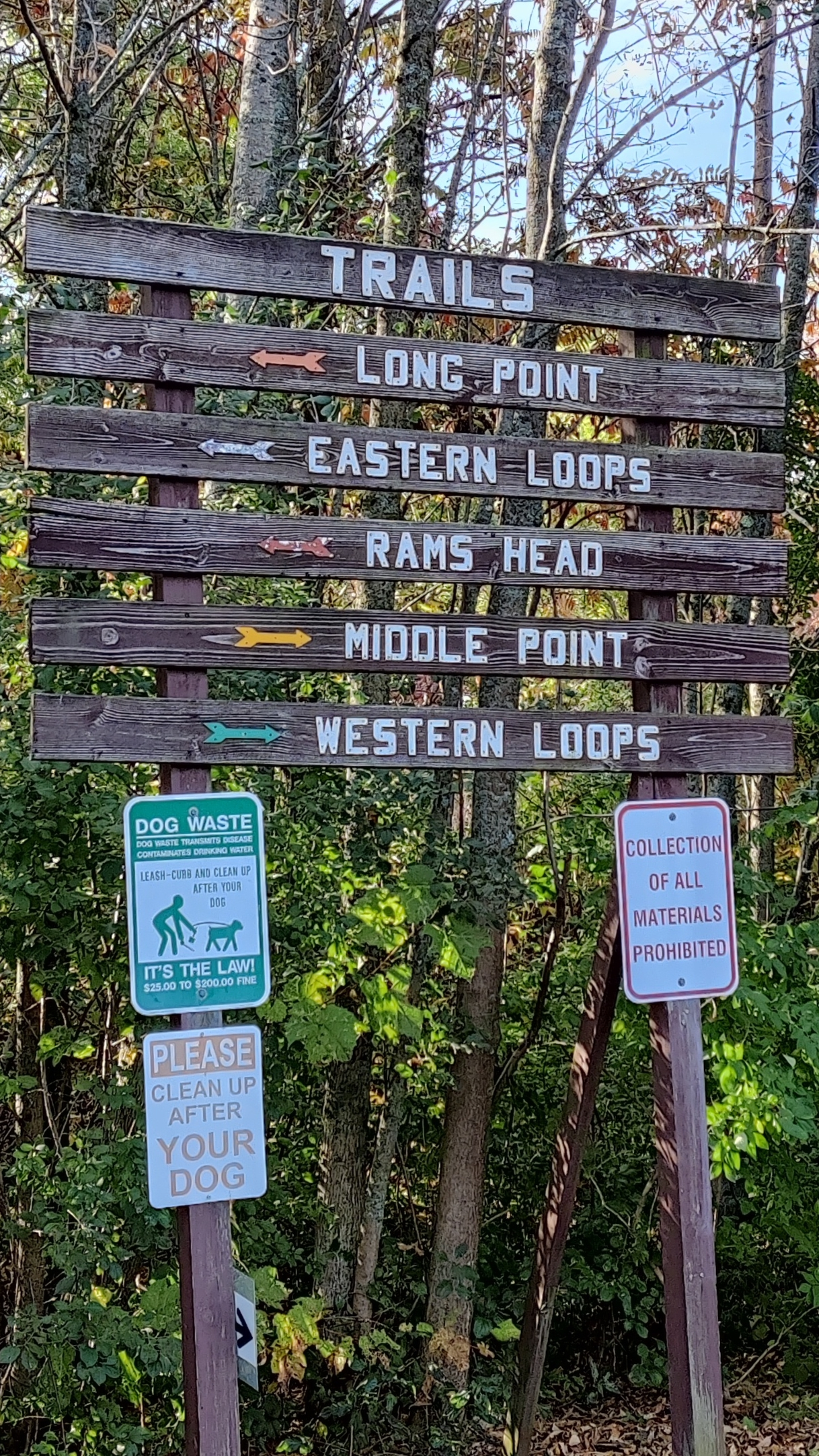
Point au Roche Trails

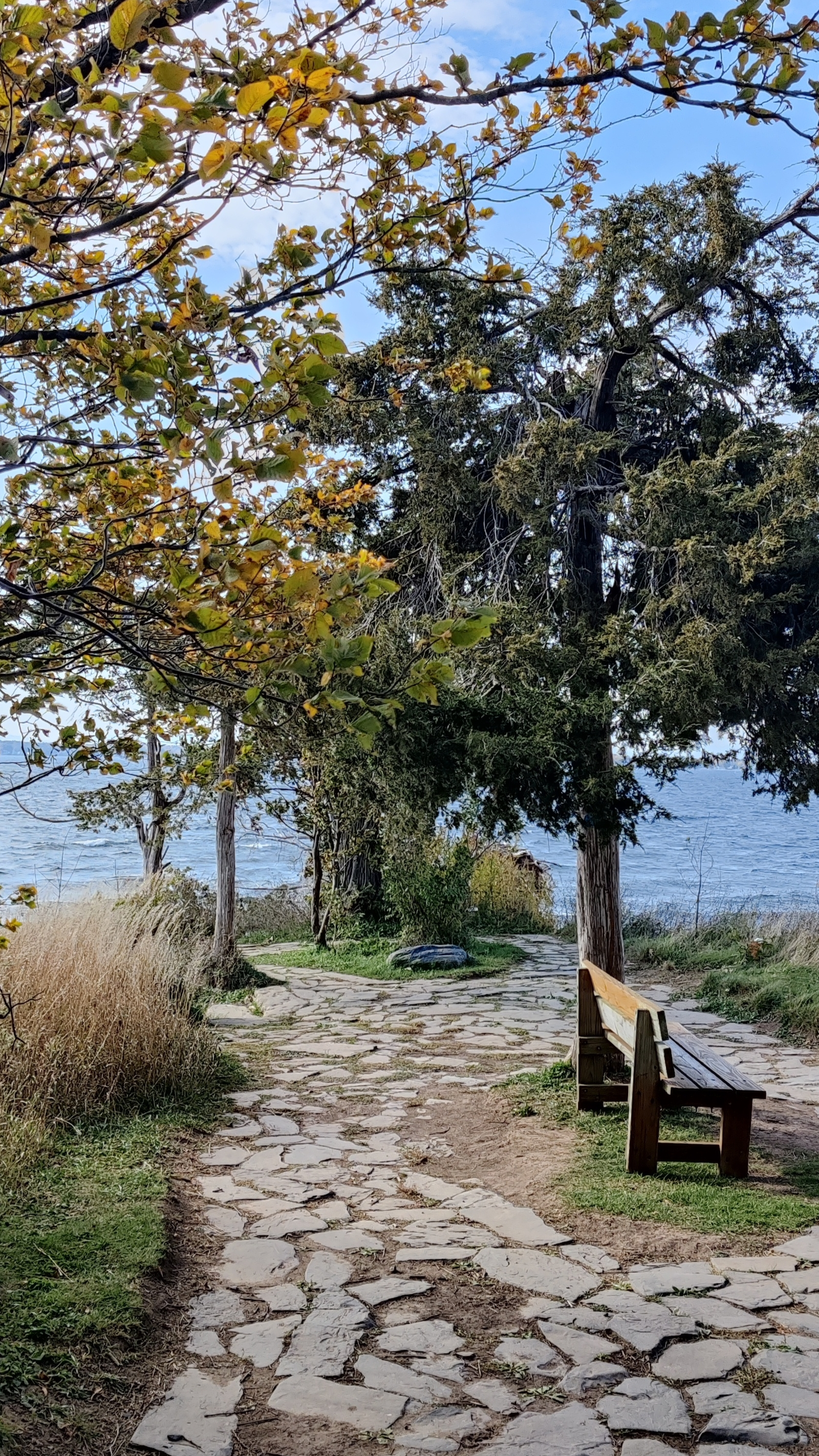
Lookout point at Point au Roche

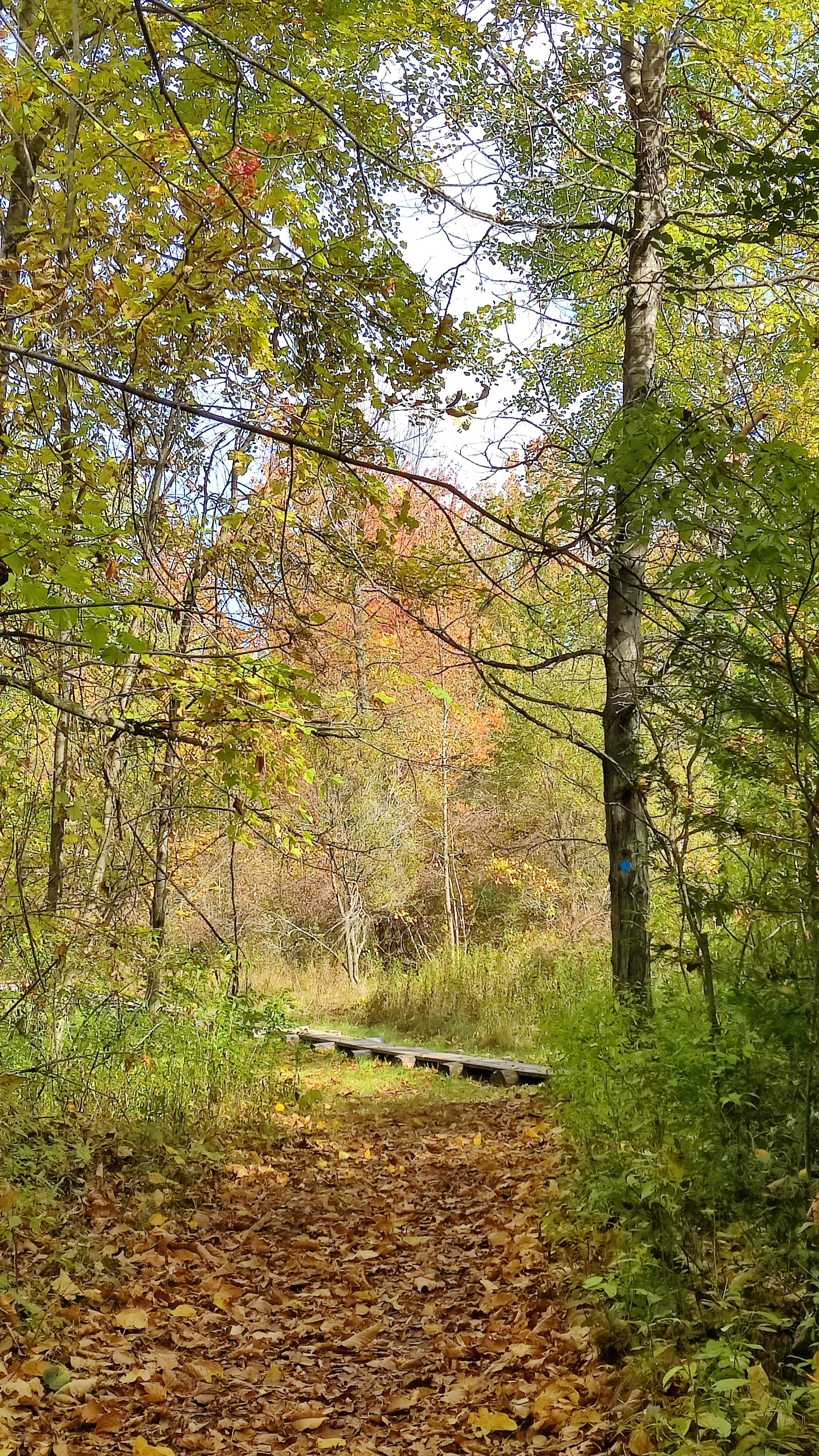
Fall colours on Point au Roche hiking trail

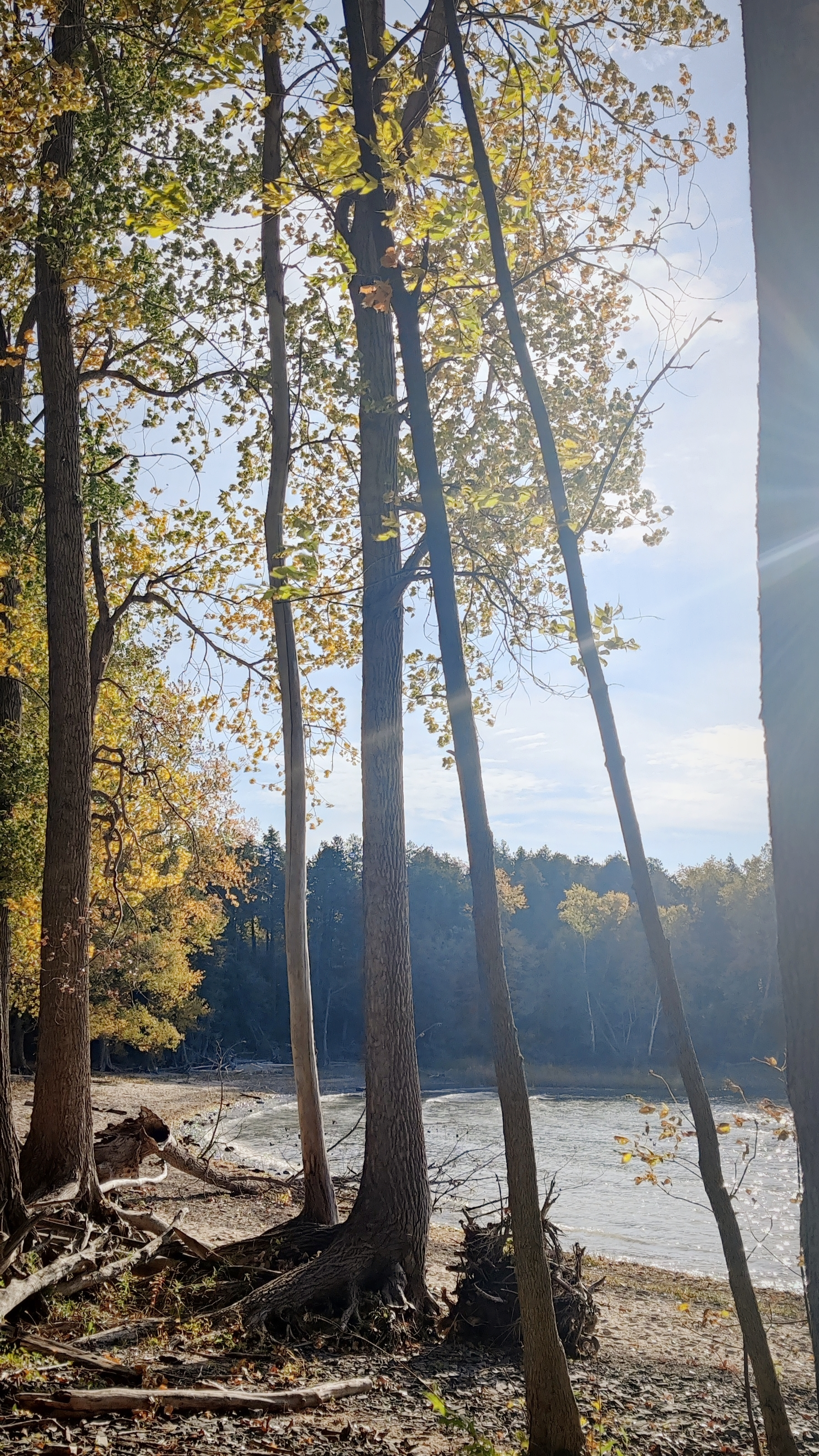
Connor's Bay beach in Point au Roche state park

== See also ==
- List of New York state parks
- Lake Champlain
