= Bristol Beach State Park =

State park in Ulster County, New York

- Location within New York
- Interactive map of Bristol Beach State Park
- Type: State park (undeveloped)
- Location: Town of Saugerties, Ulster County, New York
- Nearest city: Malden, New York
- Coordinates: 42°06′32″N 73°55′55″W
- Area: 242 acres (0.98 km^{2})
- Created: 1967
- Operator: New York State Office of Parks, Recreation and Historic Preservation; Palisades Interstate Park Commission
- Visitors: 11,610 (in 2020)
- Open: All year

Bristol Beach State Park is a 242-acre (0.98 km^{2}) undeveloped state park located on the Hudson River in the town of Saugerties in Ulster County, New York. The park was initially formed in 1967, and is managed by the Palisades Interstate Park Commission.

== History ==
The core of Bristol Beach State Park occupies land formerly used as a brickyard during the 19th century. It was acquired by the town of Saugerties by deed; the town eventually transferred ownership to New York State. In 1967, the then-53-acre (21 ha) property was transferred from the New York State Conservation Department to the Palisades Interstate Park Commission. The park was expanded in the 1990s to protect adjacent parcels that were being considered for development.

In 2013, the town of Saugerties proposed re-acquiring the park to promote its development, which they felt was being under-utilized by the state.

== Description ==
Bristol Beach State Park covers 242 acres (0.98 km^{2}) adjacent to the Hudson River and is largely undeveloped, with the exception of a small parking lot. Although there are no formal trails, a landing on the river is a popular spot for launching kayaks and fishing. The northern portion of the park, known as Eve's Point, does include some basic amenities such as a gazebo and portable toilets.

Despite its name, the park does not include a developed beach and swimming is not permitted. Steep banks, undesirable substrate, and shallow off-shore water depths were noted as barriers preventing future development of a beach at the property.

== See also ==
- List of New York state parks
