= Highland Lakes State Park =

State park in Orange County, New York

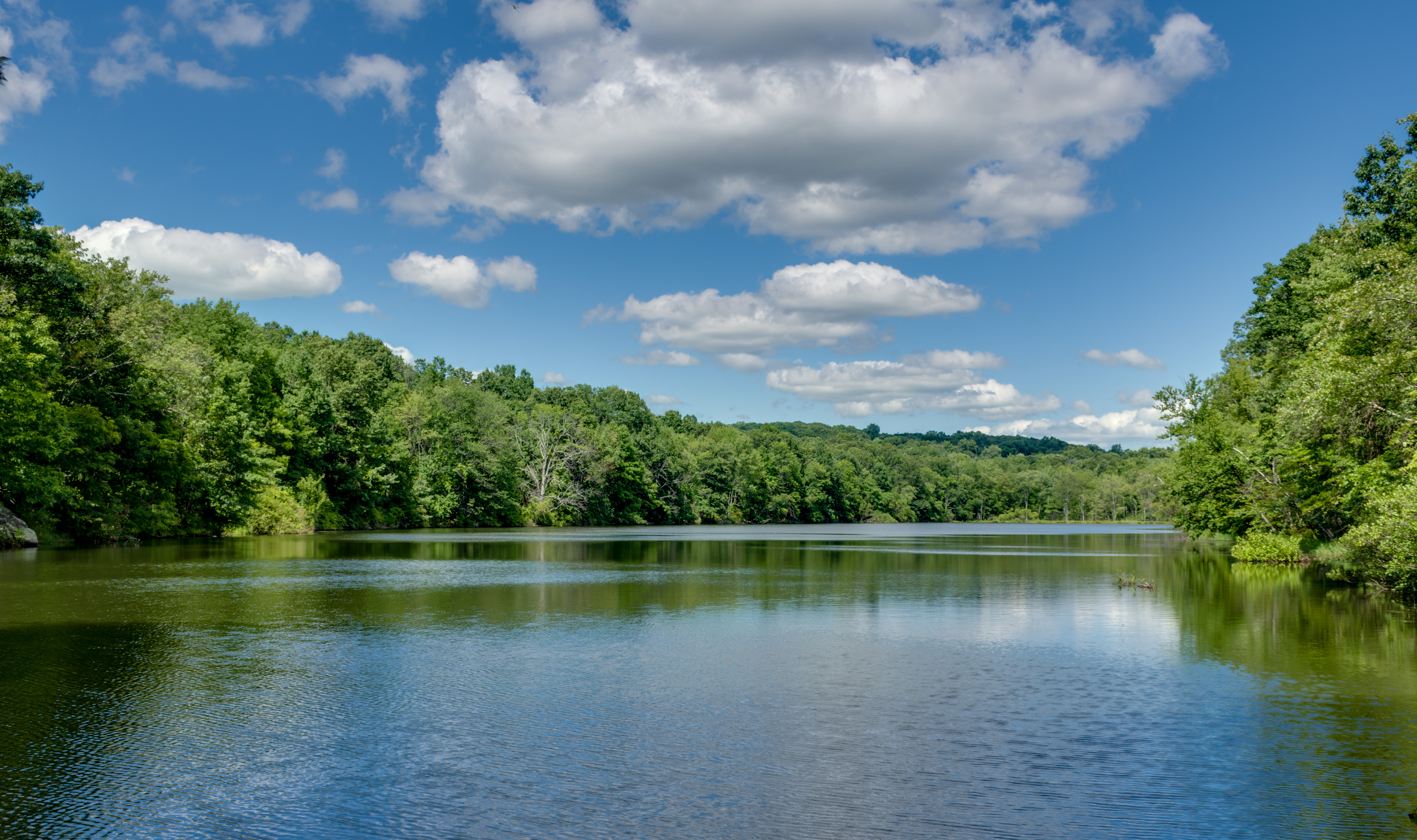
- Highland Lakes State Park, August 2017

- Location within New York
- Type: State park
- Location: 55-223 Tamms Road; Middletown, New York
- Nearest city: Middletown, New York
- Coordinates: 41°30′35″N 74°19′25″W
- Area: 3,115 acres (12.61 km^{2})
- Created: 1964
- Operator: Palisades Interstate Park Commission; New York State Office of Parks, Recreation and Historic Preservation
- Visitors: 3,149 (in 2019)
- Open: All year
- Website: Highland Lakes State Park

Highland Lakes State Park is a 3,115-acre (12.61 km^{2}) undeveloped state park in the towns of Wallkill and Crawford in Orange County, New York, United States. The park is located northeast of the city of Middletown, west of Route 211. It is the largest undeveloped park managed by the Palisades Interstate Park Commission.

== Park description ==
Highland Lakes State Park is a largely undeveloped park, and primarily offers opportunities for passive recreation including hiking, fishing, horseback riding and model airplane flying. Although a series of informal trails and woodland roads exist within the park, no trails are officially maintained.

== See also ==
- List of New York state parks
