= Mark Twain State Park and Soaring Eagles Golf Course =

Golf course in Horseheads, New York

Mark Twain State Park
- Location within New York
- Type: State park
- Location: 201 Middle Road; Horseheads, New York
- Coordinates: 42°12′22″N 76°49′37″W
- Area: 464 acres (1.88 km^{2})
- Operator: New York State Office of Parks, Recreation and Historic Preservation
- Visitors: 26,930 (in 2014)
- Open: All year
- Website: Mark Twain State Park and Soaring Eagles Golf Course

Mark Twain State Park and Soaring Eagles Golf Course is a 464-acre (1.88 km^{2}) state park located in the Town of Horseheads in Chemung County, New York. The park was named for Mark Twain, who spent several summers in the area.

== Facilities ==
The park includes the 18-hole Soaring Eagles Golf Course, which is designed around several kettle ponds created by retreating glaciers following the most recent ice age. The park also includes a food concession, and facilitates cross-country skiing and archery hunting in season.

== See also ==
- List of New York state parks
