= Canopus Lake =

Lake in New York, United States

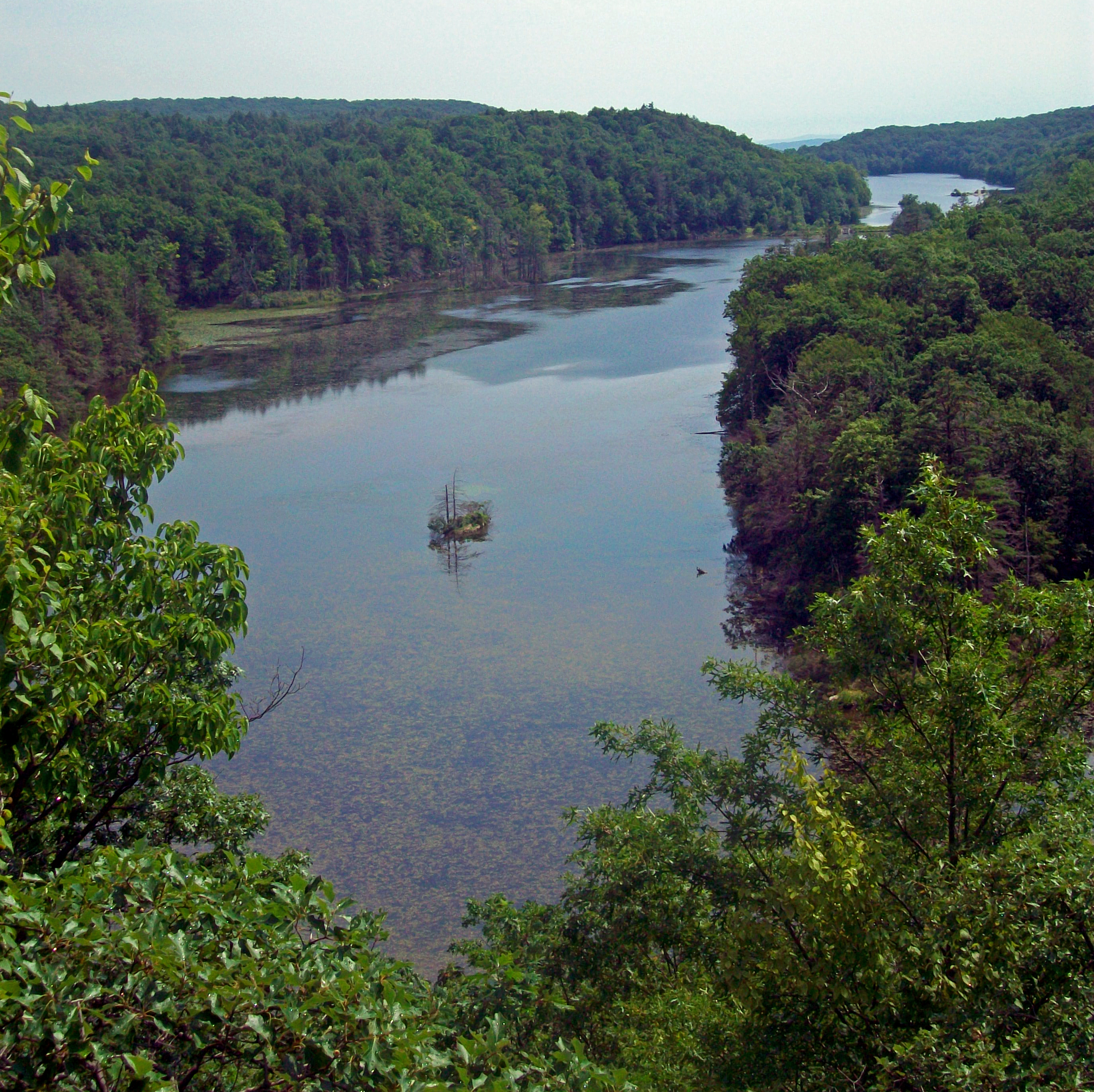
- View from Appalachian Trail at north end of lake

- Location within New York Location within the United States
- Location: Clarence Fahnestock State Park, Putnam County, New York
- Coordinates: 41.4619°N 73.8329°W
- Primary outflows: Canopus Brook
- Basin countries: United States
- Max. length: 1.5 miles (2.4 km)
- Max. width: 400 feet (120 m)
- Surface area: 105 acres (42 ha)
- Surface elevation: 914 feet (279 m)

Canopus Lake is a small lake within Clarence Fahnestock State Park in northern Putnam County, New York, United States. The lake is about 2.4 kilometres (1.5 mi) long and 120 metres (390 ft) wide at its widest point and 66 acres (27 ha) in area. Immediately to its east is Pelton Pond. The lake is on NY 301 just west of the Taconic State Parkway.

The beach at the lake is used for swimming, boating, and fishing. In the winter, some cross-country skiers use the flat surface as a trail. The Appalachian Trail parallels the west side of the lake.
