= Conesus Lake Boat Launch =

State park in Livingston County, New York

- Location within New York
- Interactive map of Conesus Lake Boat Launch
- Type: State park
- Location: Conesus Lake, Livingston County, New York
- Nearest city: Livonia, New York
- Coordinates: 42°46′34″N 77°42′43″W
- Area: 3 acres (1.2 ha)
- Operator: New York State Office of Parks, Recreation and Historic Preservation
- Visitors: 27,025 (in 2014)
- Open: April to October
- Website: Conesus Lake Boat Launch

Conesus Lake Boat Launch is a three-acre (1.2 ha) state park on the east shore of Conesus Lake, one of the minor Finger Lakes, near the village of Livonia in Livingston County, New York.

The park is open from late-April to mid-October and offers a boat launch, fishing access, and picnic tables.

== See also ==
- List of New York state parks
