= St. Lawrence State Park Golf Course =

State park and golf course in New York State

- Location within New York
- Type: State park
- Location: 4955 State Highway 37; Ogdensburg, New York
- Coordinates: 44°37′59″N 75°34′59″W
- Area: 316 acres (1.28 km^{2})
- Operator: New York State Office of Parks, Recreation and Historic Preservation
- Visitors: 9,386 (in 2014)
- Open: All year
- Website: St. Lawrence State Park Golf Course State Park

St. Lawrence State Park Golf Course is a 316-acre (1.28 km^{2}) state park and golf course located in the town of Oswegatchie on the St. Lawrence River between the town of Morristown and the city of Ogdensburg in St. Lawrence County, New York.

== Facilities ==
St. Lawrence State Park offers a nine-hole golf course, picnic areas, hiking, cross-country skiing, and snowmobiling.

== See also ==
- List of New York state parks
