= Goosepond Mountain State Park =

State park in Orange County, New York

- A boardwalk winds through the marshes at Goosepond Mountain State Park.

- Location within New York
- Type: State park (undeveloped)
- Location: 1198 New York 17M; Chester, New York
- Nearest city: Chester, New York
- Coordinates: 41°20′19″N 74°14′43″W
- Area: 1,706 acres (6.90 km^{2})
- Created: 1960
- Operator: Palisades Interstate Park Commission; New York State Office of Parks, Recreation and Historic Preservation
- Visitors: 2,967 (in 2014)
- Open: All year
- Website: Goosepond Mountain State Park

Goosepond Mountain State Park, also known as Goose Pond Mountain State Park, is a 1,706-acre (6.90 km^{2}) undeveloped state park located in Orange County, New York. The park is located within the Town of Chester and is administered by the Palisades Interstate Park Commission.

== Park description ==
Goosepond Mountain State Park is an undeveloped park, and is available for passive recreation such as hiking, horseback riding, and bird watching. A small section is accessible to casual hikers via a boardwalk, and there are additional extensive trails for hikers and horseback riders. Part of the area is a wetland used as a bird sanctuary.

The loyalist leader Claudius Smith may have used a rock shelter in the area as a hideout during the American Revolutionary War.

== Gallery ==
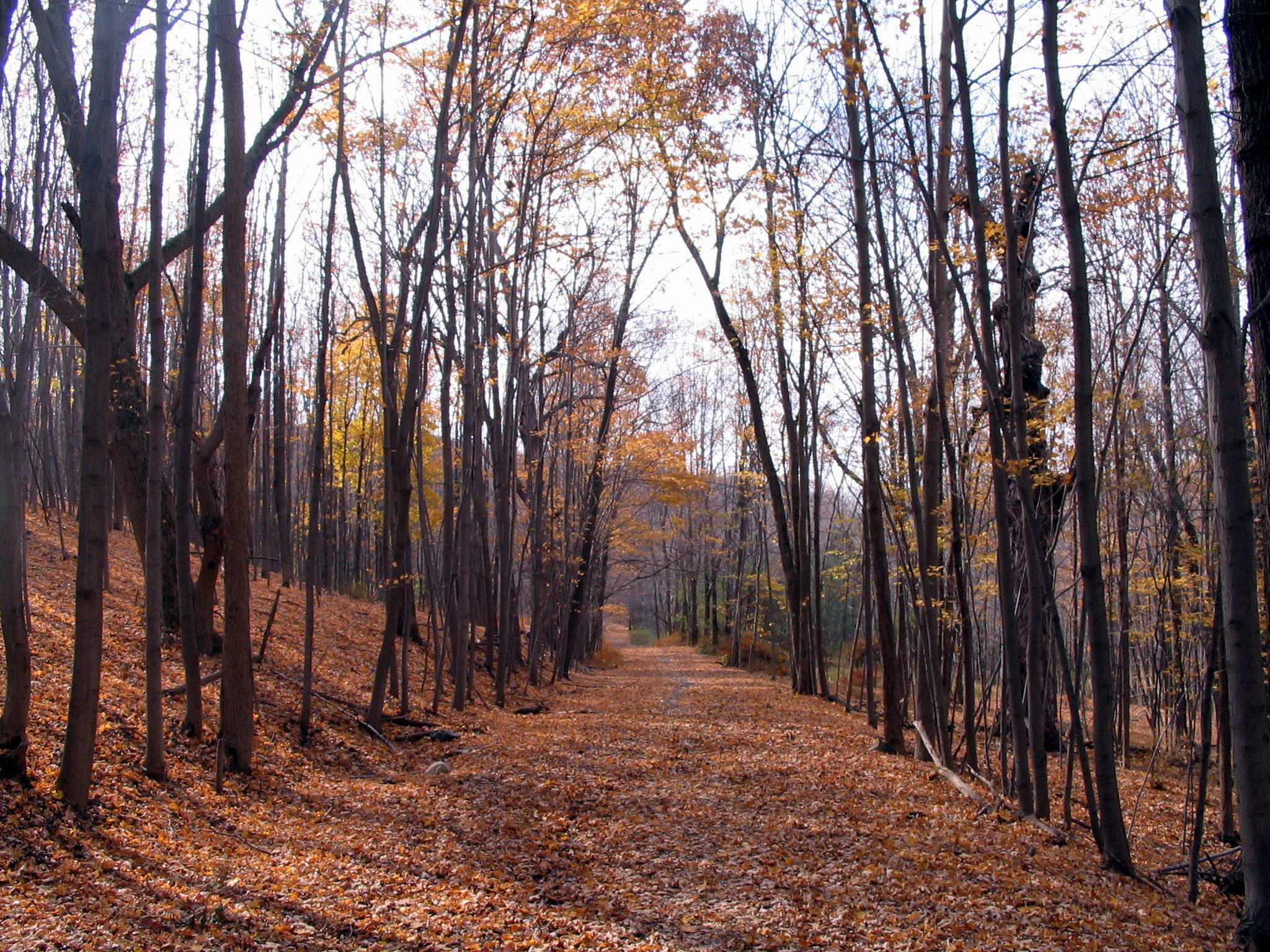
The paved, blue-blazed trail

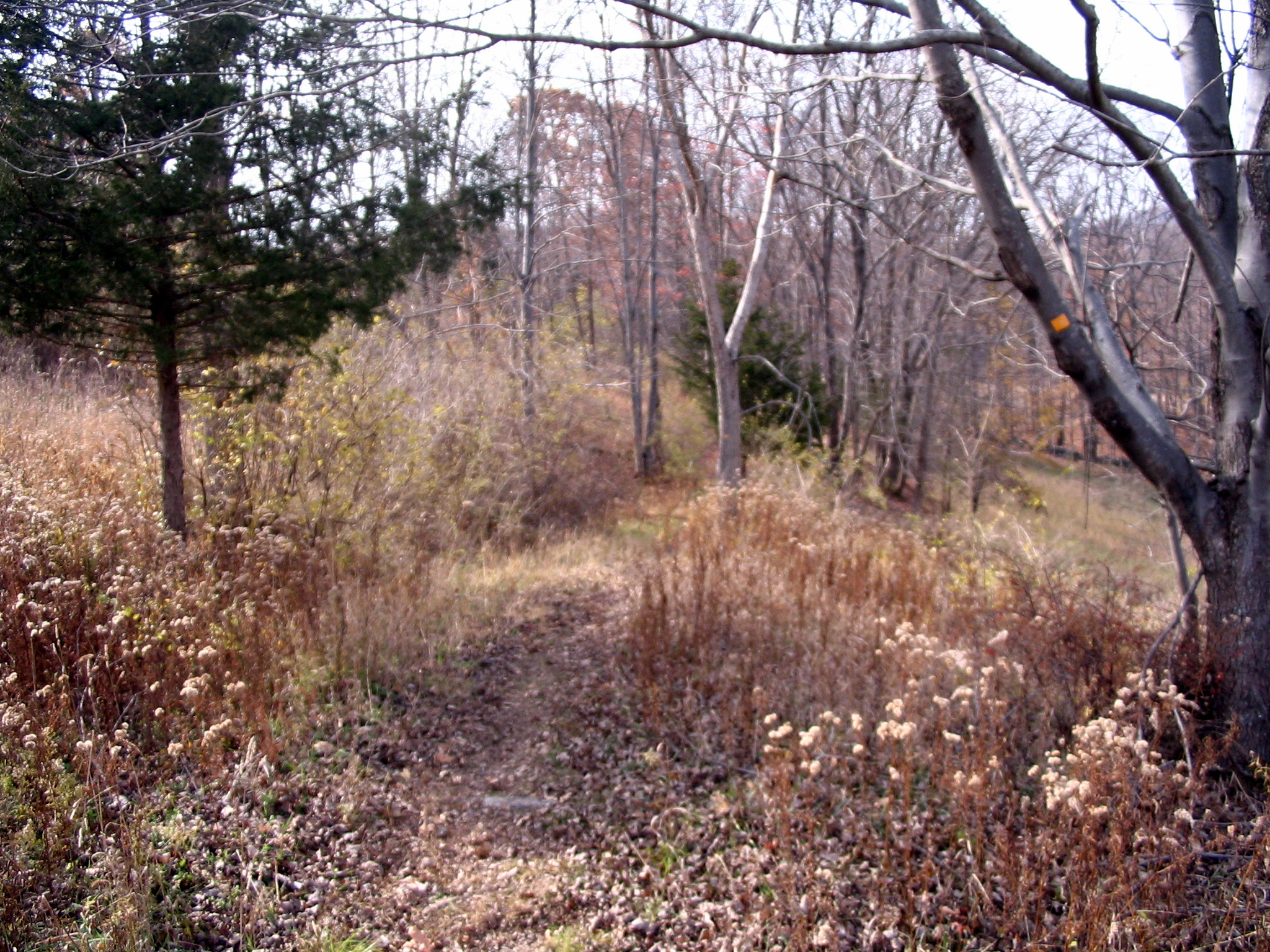
The more primitive orange-blazed trail

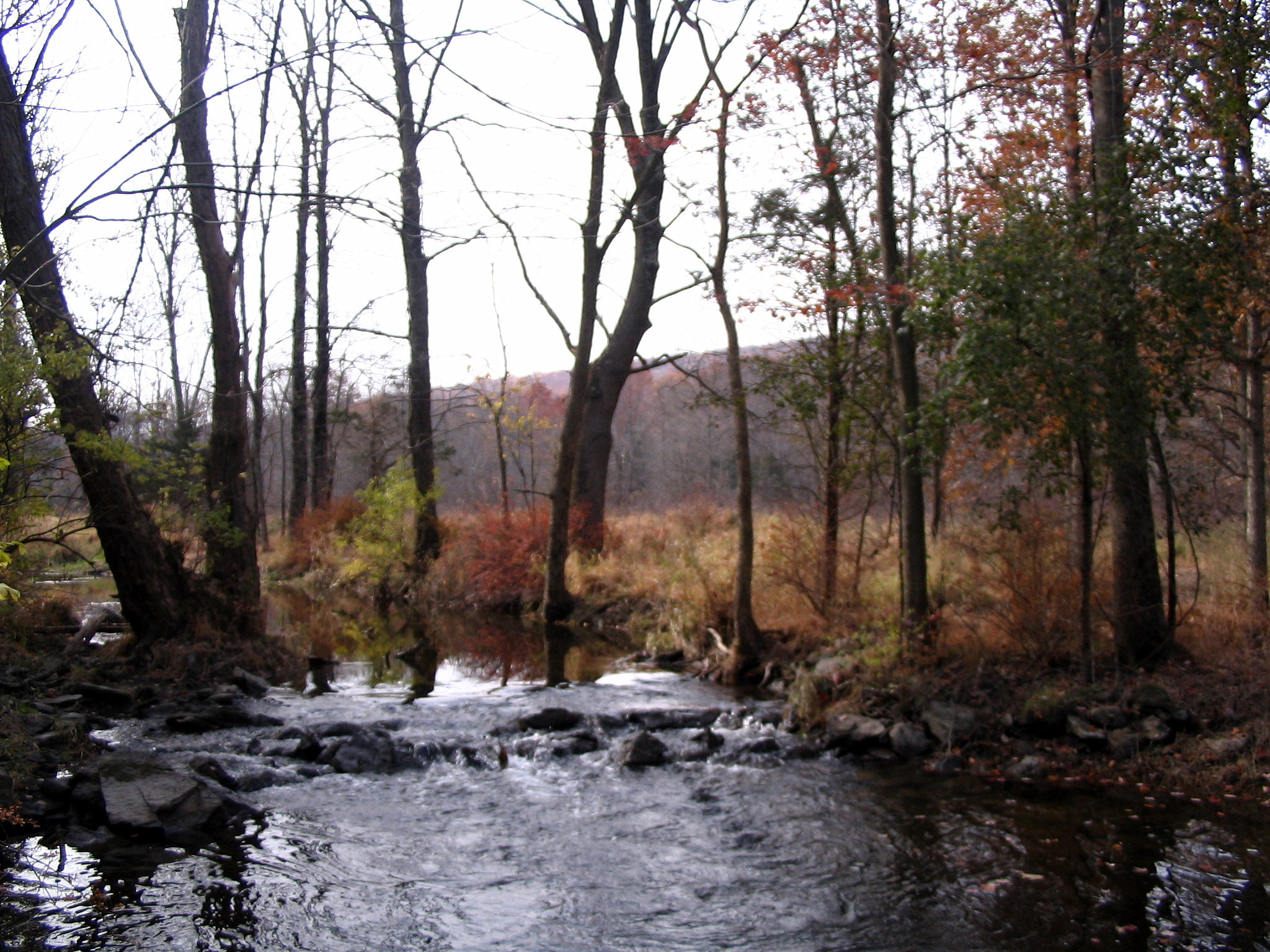
Seely Brook

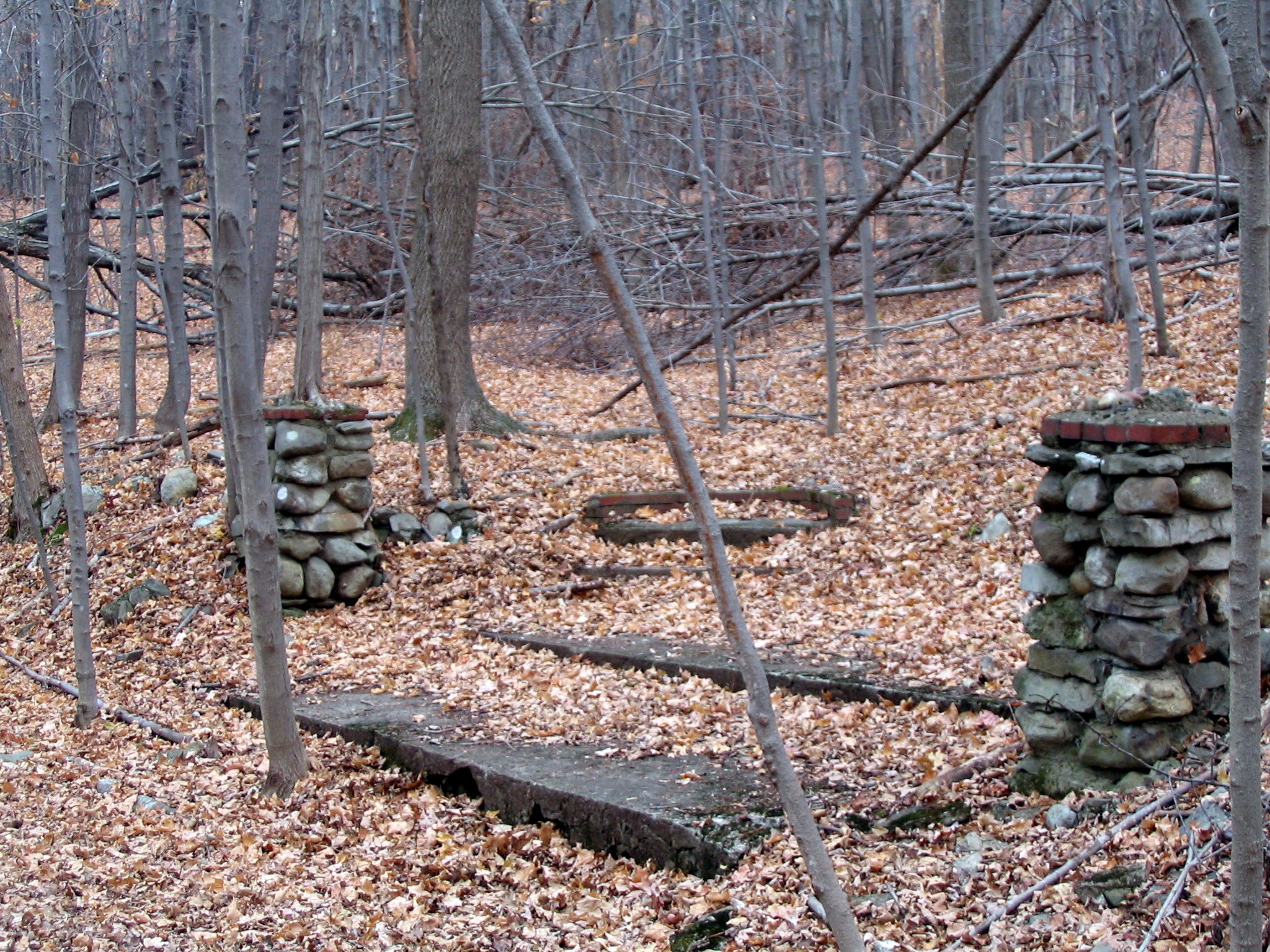
Abandoned stone structures can be found within the park

== See also ==
- List of New York state parks
