= Robert V. Riddell State Park =

State park in Otsego and Delaware counties, New York

- Location within New York
- Type: State park
- Location: Riddell Road; Davenport, New York
- Nearest city: Oneonta
- Coordinates: 42°28′33″N 74°56′44″W
- Area: 2,163 acres (8.75 km^{2})
- Created: 2005
- Operator: New York State Office of Parks, Recreation and Historic Preservation
- Open: All year
- Website: Robert V. Riddell State Park

Robert V. Riddell State Park is a 2,163-acre (8.75 km^{2}) state park in Otsego and Delaware counties, New York. The park is located approximately 20 miles (32 km) from Cooperstown.

== History ==
Robert V. Riddell State Park began as a 1,036-acre (4.19 km^{2}) gift to the state by Patricia Riddell Kent and Steven Kent in 2005, who intended for the land to be preserved as open space. Prior to the donation, the land had been held by Patricia's family since 1871, and the park is named after her father, Robert V. Riddell.

The park was expanded in 2008 when Hartwick College sold 840 acres (3.4 km^{2}) of its Pine Lake Environmental Campus to the state. Since 2010, a collaborative agreement between the college and the state allows for the park to be used for outdoor education, with the college undertaking research to study the effects of recreational impacts on public lands.

== Description ==
Robert V. Riddell State Park allows passive recreation such as hiking, snowshoeing, cross-country skiing, and fishing. Interstate 88 separates the northern section of the park, which consists of former agricultural land, from the park's forested southern section. Schenevus Creek, a trout stream that is a tributary of the Susquehanna River, is located in the northern portion of the park. Park facilities are concentrated in the northern section of the park, with the southern section consisting primarily of trails and access roads.

The park includes Mud Lake, a spring-fed pond that features a dwarf shrub bog at its edges. The bog includes floating mats of sphagnum moss, carnivorous plants, and peat deposits greater than 27 feet (8.2 m) deep in places.

== See also ==
- List of New York state parks
