= Mohawk River State Park =

Nature preserve in New York, United States

Mohawk River Nature Preserve
- Location within New York
- Type: Nature preserve (undeveloped)
- Location: Town of Niskayuna; Schenectady County, New York
- Nearest city: Schenectady, New York
- Coordinates: 42°48′13″N 73°51′05″W
- Area: 105 acres (0.42 km^{2})
- Created: April 2006
- Operator: Niskayuna, New York
- Open: All year

Mohawk River Nature Preserve, formerly Mohawk River State Park, is a 105-acre (0.42 km^{2}) undeveloped nature preserve in the town of Niskayuna in Schenectady County, New York. The park is located adjacent to the Mohawk River.

== History ==
Mohawk River Nature Preserve occupies the site of the former Schenectady Museum Nature Preserve. New York State purchased the preserve from the Schenectady Museum in April 2006 for $1 million to establish the park, which was the first state park in Schenectady County. The town of Niskayuna acquired the park from New York State for $1 in 2024.

== Description ==
Mohawk River State Park may be accessed from a small parking area at the end of Whitmyer Drive in Niskayuna. Although the state initially planned to add amenities such as picnic areas and a boat launch, as of 2012 the park remained almost completely undeveloped, including a lack of signs identifying the state park by its current name. The New York State Office of Parks, Recreation and Historic Preservation noted that no further development was planned, and that the park was intended to preserve the natural landscape and host passive recreation such as hiking.

The Mohawk Hudson Bike/Hike Trail passes along the park's northern boundary in parallel with the Mohawk River. The park also contains several trails maintained by local volunteer groups, including a portion of the John F. Brown Trail System. The park's trails connect with additional public lands, including about 100 acres (0.40 km^{2}) of adjacent town-owned land, and a boat launch near the New York State Canal Corporation's Lock 7 facility.

== See also ==
- List of New York state parks
