= Strawberry Island (New York) =

Island in Erie County, New York, United States

- Aerial view of the island, August 2018

- Location within New York

Geography
- Location: Niagara River
- Coordinates: 42°57′13″N 78°55′25″W
- Area: 5 acres (2.0 ha)
- Highest elevation: 568 ft (173.1 m)

Administration
- United States
- State: New York
- County: Erie
- Town: Tonawanda
- Owner: New York State Office of Parks, Recreation and Historic Preservation

Strawberry Island is an uninhabited island in the Niagara River located in Erie County, New York, southeast of Grand Island. The five-acre (2 ha) island is owned by the New York State Office of Parks, Recreation and Historic Preservation and is managed as a fish and wildlife preserve.

== Location and description ==
Strawberry Island is located southeast of Grand Island, and is the dividing point for the east and west branches of the Niagara River. The horseshoe-shaped island includes a lagoon and emergent vegetation on its north side and stands of willow trees on its southern edge.

The five-acre (2 ha) island is owned by the New York State Office of Parks, Recreation and Historic Preservation and is officially designated as Strawberry Island State Park, which is undeveloped. The island is managed as a fish and wildlife preserve in conjunction with the New York State Department of Environmental Conservation.

It is part of a small archipelago along with Frog Island, Motor Island and Little Beaver Island, all small islands located slightly downstream of Strawberry Island.

== History ==
=== Cultural history ===
The name "Strawberry Island" is present in records as early as 1750, although the origin of the name is not clear. The island was used by British forces during the War of 1812 as a staging area for a siege of Buffalo in 1814, and was purchased from the Seneca in 1815.

A two-story hotel, including an 11-acre (4.5 ha) grove of trees and a canal, was built upon the island in 1882, however it soon faded and was dismantled by the end of the century as tourists were drawn to newer resorts on nearby Grand Island. The island passed through a succession of private owners during the following years, including several gravel mining corporations. Mining and dredging took place on and near the island during several periods between 1912 and 1950, greatly reducing the island's size and contributing to its horseshoe shape.

The island was sold to the Town of Tonawanda in 1953, who used it to aid nearby construction projects. It was transferred to the New York State Office of Parks, Recreation and Historic Preservation in 1989.

=== Geologic and natural history ===
Strawberry Island was likely formed by the deposition of glacial sediments around a small shale outcrop during the Pleistocene.

The size of Strawberry Island has varied greatly over time, and it is today a fraction of its former size. When first mapped in the early nineteenth century, the island was estimated to cover approximately 100 acres (40 ha) and consisted primarily of marshland. The island's size increased to 138 acres (56 ha) due to soil and rock deposits from the excavation of the Erie Canal in 1819, and further grew in 1908 with the addition of material generated from the construction of a canal lock in Black Rock. The island was estimated to be 200 acres (81 ha) in 1912, but was reduced to just 40 acres (16 ha) by 1948 due to unregulated gravel mining operations during the early and mid 1900s. The island was further diminished to 25 acres (10 ha) by 1950 as dredging was concentrated on the island's center, expanding its lagoon. The island continued to lose area due to erosion from high water levels and winter storms during the latter half of the 20th century. It was estimated to be 20 acres (8 ha) in 1987, and had further decreased to five acres (2 ha) by 2013.

Plans to stabilize and rehabilitate Strawberry Island, in addition to several nearby islands, were developed in 2007 as part of a coordinated habitat enhancement project funded by the New York Power Authority. Work was completed on Frog Island, a previously submerged five-acre (2 ha) island located just downstream of Strawberry Island, in 2014. Ecosystem restoration work was completed on Motor Island and Little Beaver Island during the same time period. A $3.2 million contract was awarded to commence work on wetland rehabilitation and erosion control on Strawberry Island in March 2015.

== Wildlife habitat ==
Strawberry Island bounds one edge of a 400-acre (160 ha) area of shallow river known as the "Strawberry Island – Motor Island Shallows", recognized as the Niagara River's largest riverine littoral zone, a valuable type of fish and wildlife habitat that is regionally rare. The shallows were found to be one of two major spawning areas for muskellunge in the Niagara River in the 1970s, as well as being productive habitat for other game fish species. The area is also recognized as an important overwintering area for waterfowl.

After several unsuccessful attempts, a pair of bald eagles was observed to successfully establish a nest on Strawberry Island in 2013, part of a recent resurgence in the bald eagle populations within the region. To encourage and protect nesting eagles, since 2016 portions of the island have been designated as off-limits during nesting season, and motorized boating has been restricted near the island.

== See also ==
- List of New York state parks
