= Clarence Fahnestock State Park =

State park in New York, United States

Clarence Fahnestock Memorial State Park
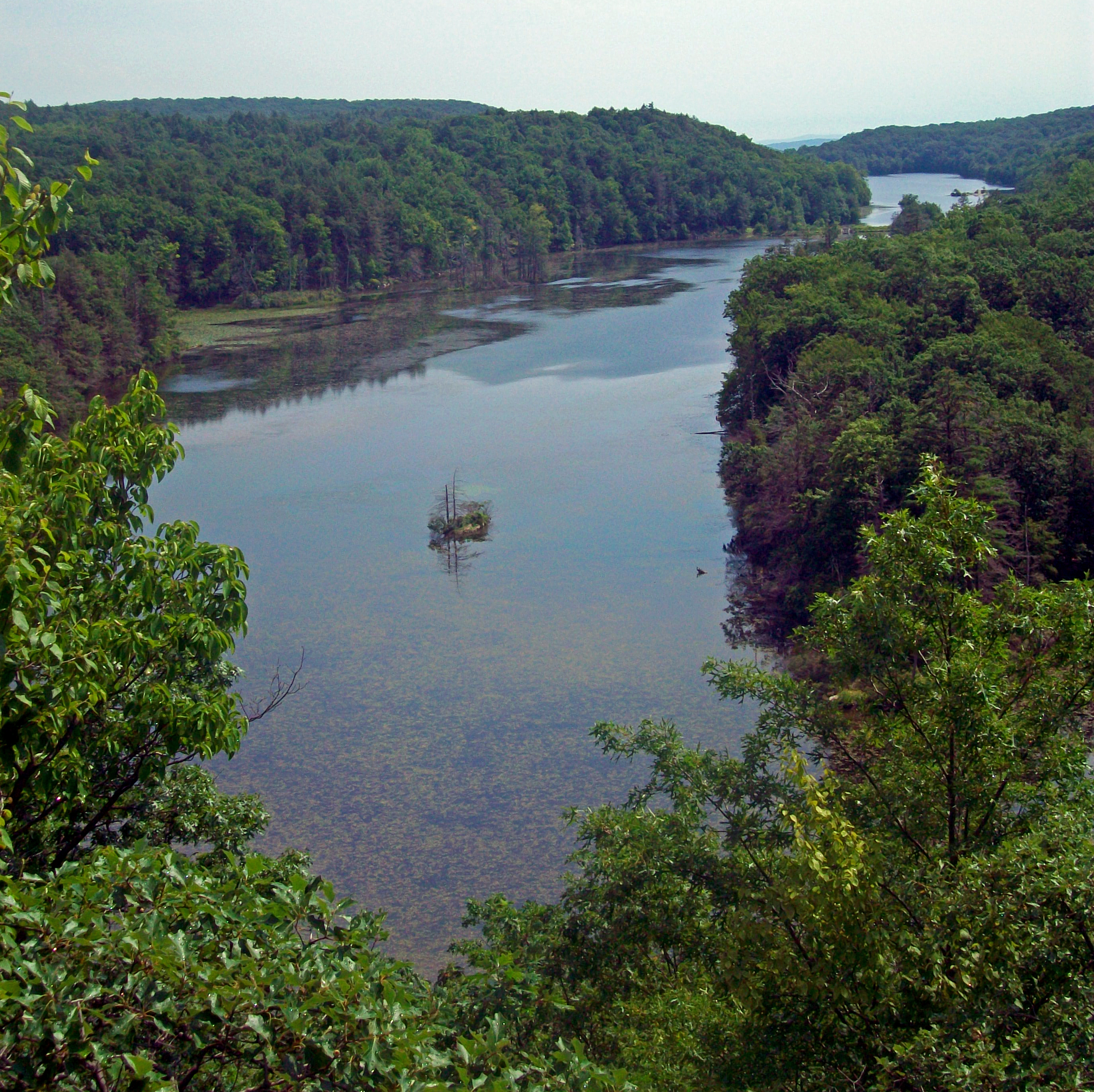
- Canopus Lake in Fahnestock Memorial State Park

- Location within New York
- Type: State park
- Location: 1498 Route 301; Carmel, New York
- Nearest city: Carmel, New York
- Coordinates: 41°25′44″N 73°51′29″W
- Area: 15,731 acres (63.66 km^{2})
- Created: 1929
- Operator: New York State Office of Parks, Recreation and Historic Preservation
- Visitors: 285,464 (in 2014)
- Open: All year
- Website: Clarence Fahnestock Memorial State Park

Clarence Fahnestock Memorial State Park, also known as Fahnestock State Park, is a 22.4-square-mile (58 km^{2}) state park located in Putnam and Dutchess counties, New York. The park has hiking trails, a beach on Canopus Lake, and fishing on four ponds and two lakes. Spanning parts of the towns of Putnam Valley, Kent, and Carmel, most of the park is situated in northern Putnam County between the Taconic State Parkway and U.S. Route 9.

During the winter season, part of the park functions as the Fahnestock Winter Park. The park also includes an environmental center known as the Taconic Outdoor Education Center.

== History ==
The park was created through a donation of about 2,400 acres (9.7 km^{2}) in 1929 by Dr. Ernest Fahnestock as a memorial to his brother Clarence, who died in the post-World War I influenza epidemic treating patients with the disease. Today the park covers 15,638 acres (63.28 km^{2}).

== Description ==
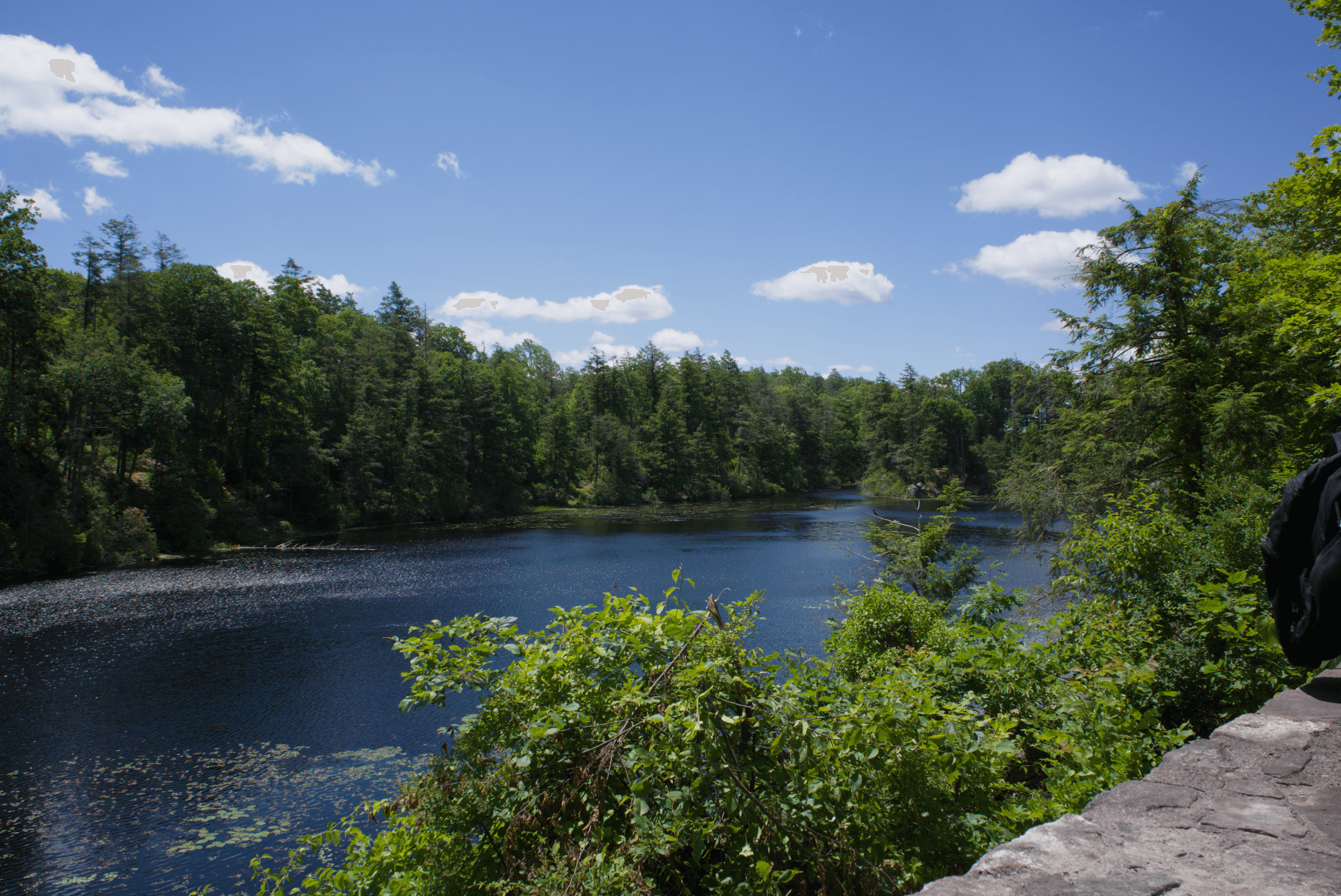
Pelton Pond within the park

Clarence Fahnestock State Park includes a lake (Canopus), a pond (Pelton), a beach, picnic tables with pavilions, a playground, recreation programs, a nature trail, hiking and biking, a bridle path, seasonal turkey and deer hunting, fishing and ice fishing, a campground with tent and trailer sites, a boat launch with boat rentals, and a food concession.

The park's forests form part of the Northeastern coastal forests ecoregion.

=== Fahnestock Winter Park ===
Contained within Clarence Fahnestock State Park is Fahnestock Winter Park, which is open from December through March, depending on conditions. The winter park offers sledding (tube only), cross-country skiing, snowshoeing, recreation programs and a nature trail. Equipment rental, lessons, and a food concession are available.

== See also ==
- Glynwood Center
- List of New York state parks
