= Pelton Pond =

Pond in Putnam County, New York, U.S.

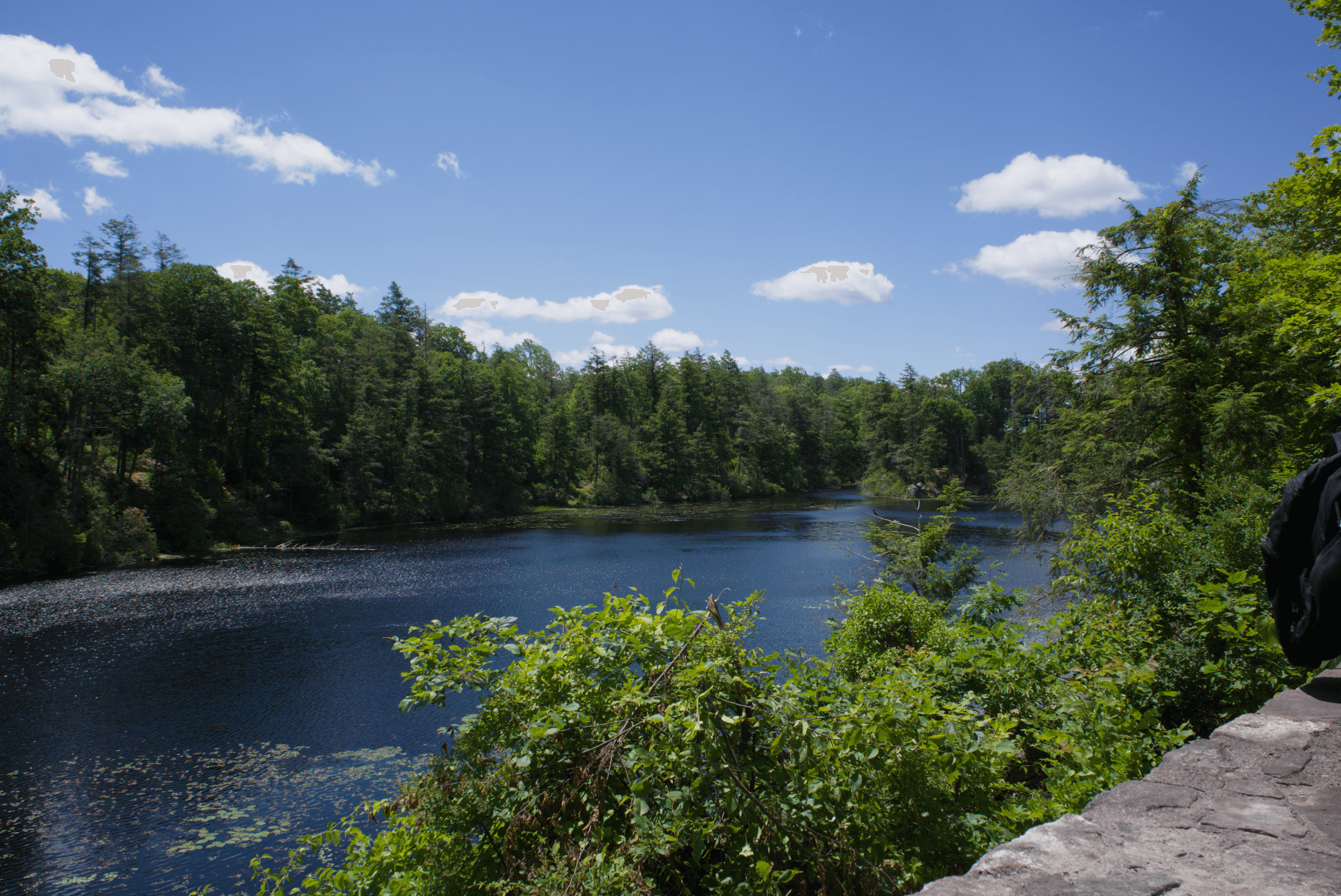
- Pelton Pond

- Location within New York
- Location: Clarence Fahnestock State Park, Putnam County, New York, United States
- Coordinates: 41.4606659°N 73.8289247°W
- Basin countries: United States
- Surface area: 8 acres (3.2 ha)

Pelton Pond is an 8-acre (3.2 ha) pond within Clarence Fahnestock State Park in northern Putnam County, in the U.S. state of New York.

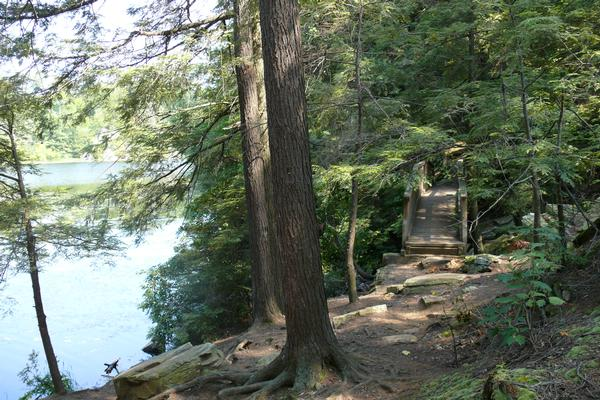
A trail leading around the pond

According to an 1849 source it is named after a local miner.
