= Sag Harbor State Golf Course =

Golf course in East Hampton, New York

Coordinates: 40.9971°N 72.2620°W

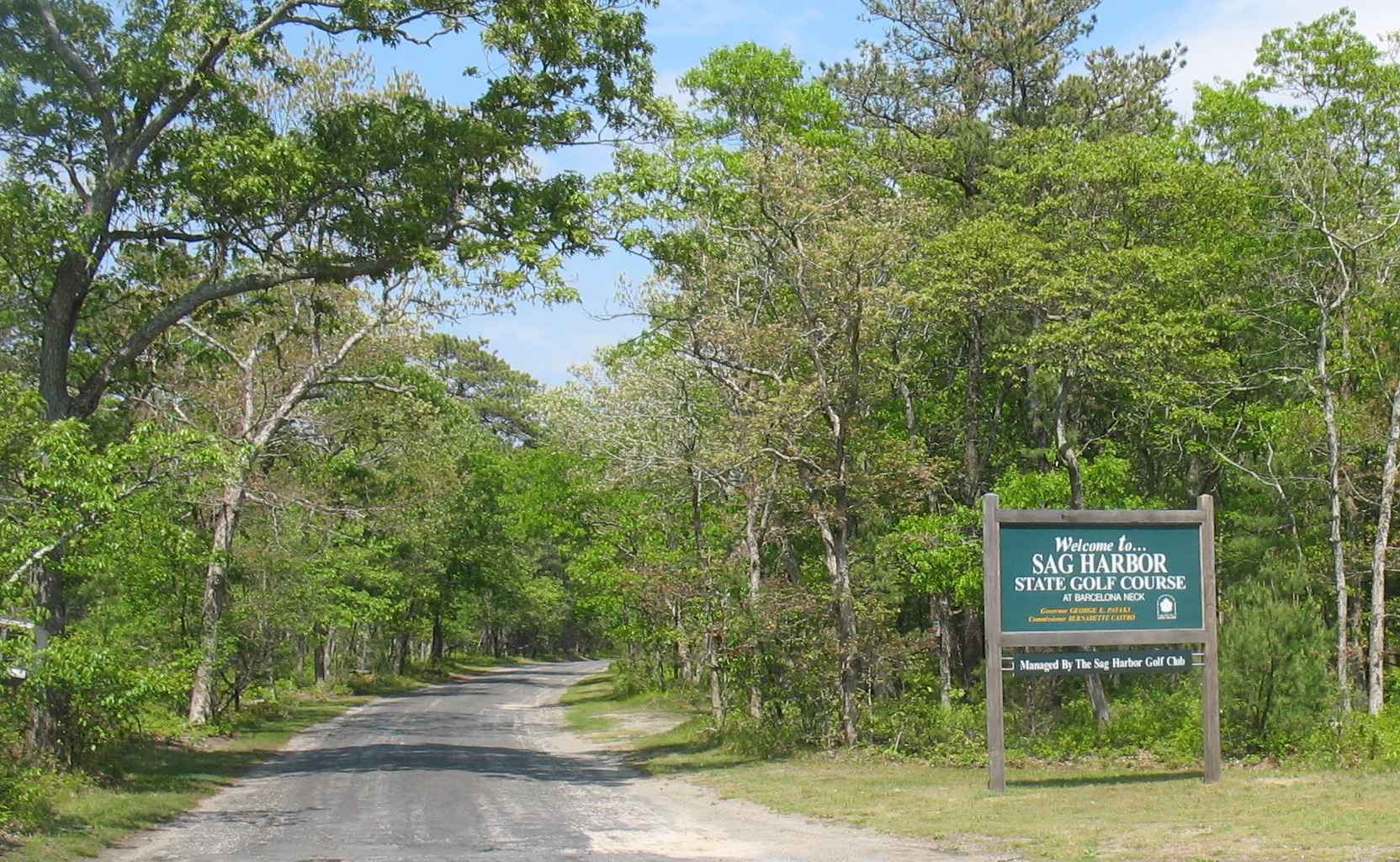
Entrance to Sag Harbor Golf Course

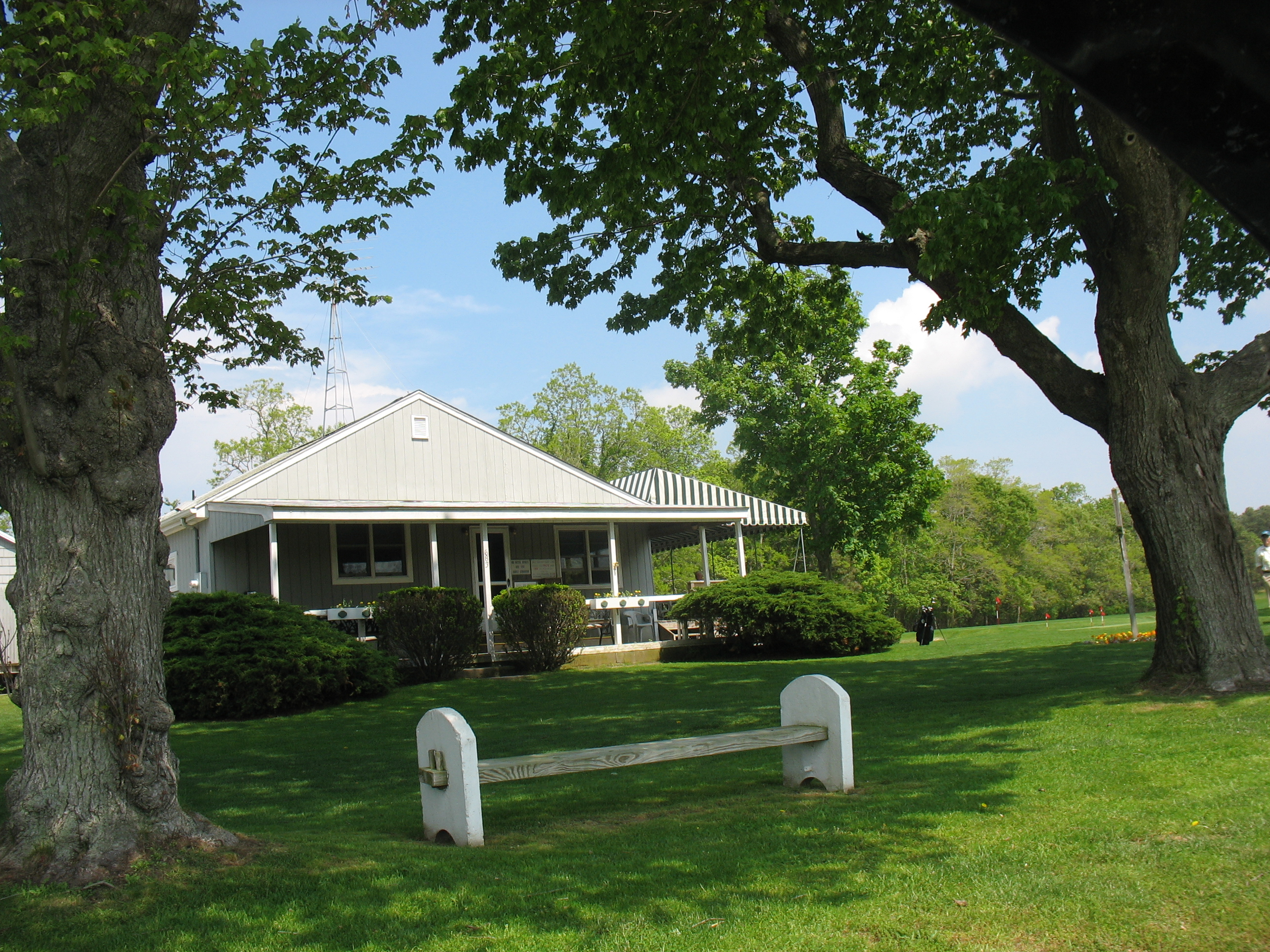
Sag Harbor Golf Course club house

The Sag Harbor State Golf Course is 48.8-acre (197,000 m^{2}), 9-hole golf course, located in the middle of a 341-acre (1.38 km^{2}) parcel known as the Barcelona Neck Natural Resources Management Area. The golf course is entirely located in the town of East Hampton in Suffolk County, New York, United States.

== Description ==
The course first opened in 1926 and was run by a group of volunteers for over half a century. The property was acquired by the New York State Department of Environmental Conservation in 1989. The course was taken over by the New York State Office of Parks, Recreation and Historic Preservation in 1997.

== See also ==
- Bethpage State Park
- Sunken Meadow State Park
- Montauk Downs State Park
