= Seneca Lake State Park =

State park in Seneca County, New York

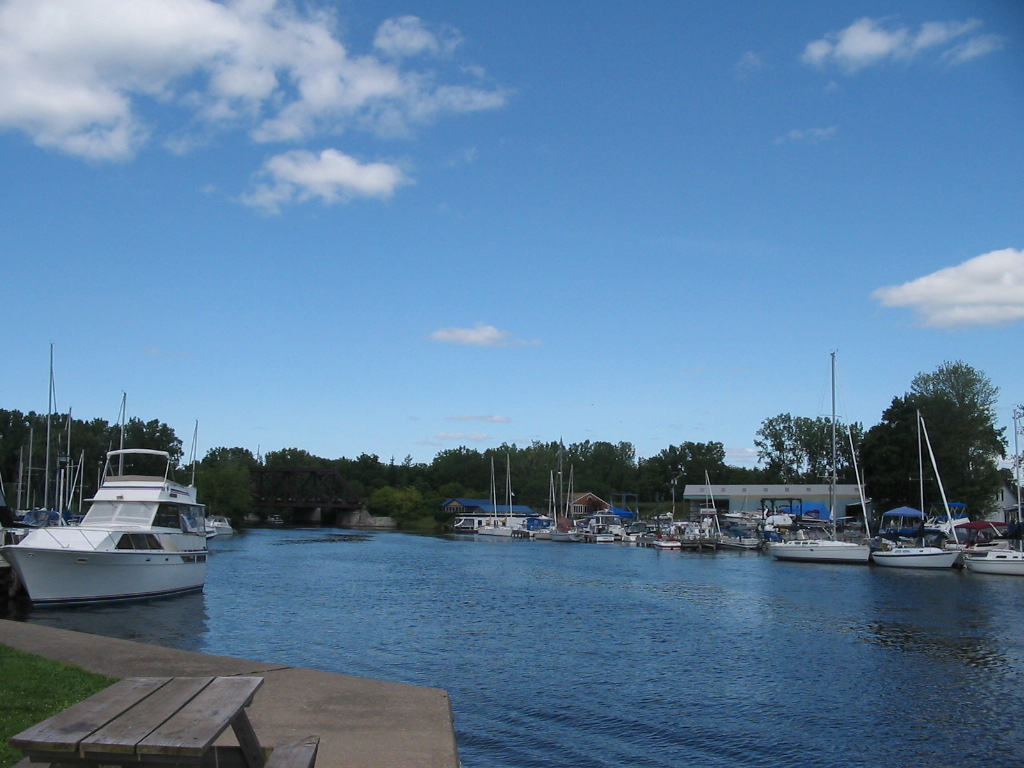
- Seneca Lake State Park marina

- Location within New York
- Type: State park
- Location: 1 Lakefront Drive; Geneva, New York
- Nearest city: Geneva, New York
- Coordinates: 42°52′23″N 76°56′46″W
- Area: 141 acres (0.57 km^{2})
- Created: 1957
- Operator: New York State Office of Parks, Recreation and Historic Preservation
- Visitors: 144,200 (in 2014)
- Open: All year
- Website: Seneca Lake State Park

Seneca Lake State Park is a 141-acre (0.57 km^{2}) state park located in Seneca County, New York in the United States. The park is at the north end of Seneca Lake, one of the Finger Lakes. The park is south of and between Geneva and Waterloo.

== Description ==
Seneca Lake State Park offers a beach, picnic tables, biking, boat launches, fishing and ice fishing. A "Sprayground" water park, as well as an adjacent traditional playground, are available for children ages 4 to 12. Two marinas with a total of 216 slips are also available at the park.

== History ==
The park began as a municipal park developed by the city of Geneva in 1922. The park was opened as Seneca Lake State Park in 1957 after the city transferred the land to the state of New York. The park's "Sprayground" was opened in 2002.

=== 2005 cryptosporidiosis outbreak ===
On August 1, 2005, the park closed its "Sprayground" water park after the parasite Cryptosporidium was discovered in the tanks supplying the attraction. By September 1 of that year, over 3,800 people had reported symptoms of cryptosporidiosis, a gastrointestinal illness caused by the parasite. After laboratory analysis, 425 cases were confirmed and a total of 1,374 probable cases were considered to have originated from the park. The incident led to the passage of increased regulations regarding sanitation procedures at water parks in New York State.

The Sprayground reopened on August 26, 2006, following an upgrade of its filtration and disinfection facilities which included the incorporation of an ultraviolet unit. A $5 million class-action lawsuit brought against New York State was settled in 2014, with damages being awarded to as many as 2,500 victims of the outbreak.

== See also ==
- List of New York state parks
