= Lock 32 State Canal Park =

State park in Monroe County, New York

Coordinates: 43°5′32.7″N 77°32′43.7″W

Lock 32 State Canal Park is a New York state park in Monroe County, New York.
