= Sojourner Truth State Park =

State park in Ulster County, New York

Coordinates: 41°56′38″N 73°58′21″W

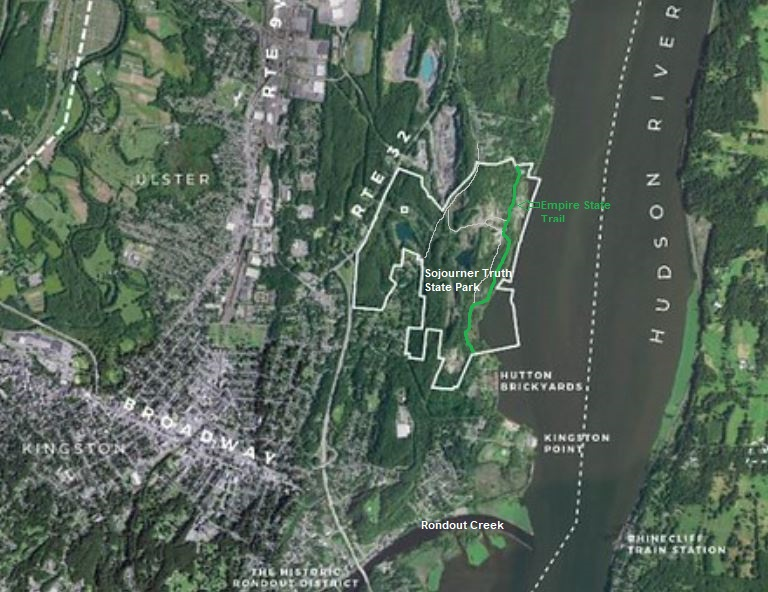
- Aerial map of the borders of Sojourner Truth State Park
- Interactive map of Sojourner Truth State Park
- Type: State park
- Location: Kingston, New York, United States
- Area: 508 acres (206 ha)
- Created: February 28, 2022
- Operator: New York State Office of Parks, Recreation and Historic Preservation
- Status: Under construction

Sojourner Truth State Park is a 508-acre (2.06 km^{2}) state park under construction in Ulster County, New York, to the north of Kingston, bounded by the Hudson River to its east and New York State Route 32 on its west. Governor Kathy Hochul dedicated it during Black History Month on February 28, 2022, in honor of Sojourner Truth, born in nearby Esopus, and opened it on April 23 to coincide with Earth Day.

== History ==
The site of this park was obtained by Scenic Hudson in 2019 and transferred to the state at a cost of $13.5 million, which was funded through the state's Environmental Protection Fund. Prior to its designation as a park, the site was used for industries such as cement production, brick making, quarrying, and ice harvesting. Prior to the park's dedication by Governor Hochul, its informal names were Hudson Cliffs State Park and Quarry Waters Park

Prior to its acquisition by Scenic Hudson, the site of this park was owned by the real estate development firm AVR, which sought to build housing on the property. From the mid-1950s until 1985, Hudson Valley Cement operated a cement facility on the site; followed by Tilcon Minerals, which manufactured construction materials here until 2005.

== Description ==
Along with industrial ruins, most of the park is 260 acres of forested hills with 37 acres of wetlands along the Hudson River. Two former quarries inside this park have been flooded since their abandonment, designed as Lost Lake and Quarry Lake. The Hudson River Brickyard Trail, which is managed by the nonprofit organization Scenic Hudson, runs through this park. The trail is part of the longer Empire State Trail.
