= Douglas Creek =

Douglas Creek may refer to:

- Douglas Creek (Canada)
- Douglass Creek (New York)
- Douglas Creek (Washington state)
