= Harvey Creek =

Harvey Creek may refer to:

- Harvey Creek (New York), a stream in New York
- Harveys Creek, a stream in Pennsylvania
- Harvey Creek (Wisconsin River tributary), a stream in Wisconsin
