= Cold Brook =

Cold Brook may refer to:

== Places ==
=== Canada ===
- Coldbrook, Nova Scotia, a community

=== United States ===
- Cold Brook, New York, a village in Herkimer County, New York
- Cold Brook (Black River), a river in Lewis County, New York
- Cold Brook (Oneida County, New York), a river in Oneida County, New York
- Cold Brook Feed Mill, a historic grist mill, in Herkimer County, New York
- Cold Brook Dam, a dam in Fall River County, South Dakota
- Cold Brook Township, Warren County, Illinois, in Warren County, Illinois
- Coldbrook, Illinois, an unincorporated community, in Warren County, Illinois

== Other ==
- Cold Brook (film), a 2018 film directed by and starring William Fichtner
