= Doe Pond =

Doe Pond may refer to:

- Doe Pond (Limekiln Lake, New York)
- Doe Pond (Big Moose, New York)
