= Muskrat Brook =

Location
- Country: United States
- State: New York

Physical characteristics
- Mouth: Little Black Creek
  - location: Wheelertown, New York
  - coordinates: 43°23′02″N 75°06′00″W
  - elevation: 1,220 ft (370 m)

Muskrat Brook flows into Little Black Creek west of Wheelertown, New York.
