= House Falls Creek =

- Location within New York

Location
- Country: United States
- State: New York

Physical characteristics
- Mouth: Black River
  - location: Glenfield, New York
  - coordinates: 43°42′09″N 75°23′04″W
  - elevation: 735 ft (224 m)
- Basin size: 7.93 sq mi (20.5 km^{2})

House Falls Creek flows into the Black River near Glenfield, New York.
