= North Branch Little Black Creek =

Location
- Country: United States
- State: New York

Physical characteristics
- Source: North Branch Lake
  - coordinates: 43°26′26″N 74°57′54″W
- Mouth: Little Black Creek
  - location: Wheelertown, New York
  - coordinates: 43°23′50″N 75°03′03″W
  - elevation: 1,319 ft (402 m)

Basin features
- Tributaries
  - right: Big Brook

North Branch Little Black Creek drains North Branch Lake and flows west passing to the south of Forty Mountain before flowing into Little Black Creek in Wheelertown, New York.
