= Indian Creek (Black River, New York) =

Location
- Country: United States
- State: New York

Physical characteristics
- Mouth: Black River
  - location: Bardwell Mill, New York
  - coordinates: 43°24′23″N 75°09′47″W
  - elevation: 1,143 ft (348 m)
- Basin size: 2.56 mi^{2} (6.6 km^{2})

Indian Creek flows into the Black River where the Black River enters Kayuta Lake near Bardwell Mill, New York.
