= South Branch Black River =

Location
- Country: United States
- State: New York

Physical characteristics
- Source: South Lake
- Mouth: Black River
  - location: North Wilmurt, New York
  - coordinates: 43°30′00″N 74°56′40″W
  - elevation: 1,862 ft (568 m)
- Basin size: 14.6 mi^{2} (38 km^{2})

South Branch Black River drains South Lake and flows into the Black River near North Wilmurt, New York.
