= Rainbow Creek (Black River tributary) =

Creek in Watson, New York

Location
- Country: United States
- State: New York

Physical characteristics
- Mouth: Black River
  - location: Watson, New York
  - coordinates: 43°46′13″N 75°26′21″W
  - elevation: 730 ft (220 m)
- Basin size: 2.97 mi^{2} (7.7 km^{2})

Rainbow Creek flows into the Black River near Watson, New York.
