= Middle Branch Little Black Creek =

Location
- Country: United States
- State: New York

Physical characteristics
- Source: Twin Lakes
- Mouth: Little Black Creek
  - location: NW of Nobleboro, New York
  - coordinates: 43°25′22″N 74°56′39″W
  - elevation: 1,647 ft (502 m)

Middle Branch Little Black Creek flows into Little Black Creek.
