= Twin Lakes Inlet =

Location
- Country: United States
- State: New York

Physical characteristics
- Mouth: Twin Lakes
  - location: NE of North Wilmurt, New York
  - coordinates: 43°29′13″N 74°56′39″W
  - elevation: 1,942 ft (592 m)

Twin Lakes Inlet flows into Twin Lakes northeast of North Wilmurt, New York.
