= Big Brook (North Branch Little Black Creek tributary) =

Location
- Country: United States
- State: New York

Physical characteristics
- Mouth: North Branch Little Black Creek
  - location: Wheelertown, New York
  - coordinates: 43°23′58″N 75°02′51″W
  - elevation: 1,332 ft (406 m)

Big Brook flows into North Branch Little Black Creek by Wheelertown, New York.
