= Whetstone Creek (Black River tributary) =

Location
- Country: United States
- State: New York

Physical characteristics
- Mouth: Black River
  - location: Glenfield, New York
  - coordinates: 43°44′13″N 75°23′44″W
  - elevation: 730 ft (220 m)
- Basin size: 11 sq mi (28 km^{2})

Whetstone Creek is a stream in Lewis County in the U.S. state of New York. It flows into the Black River near Glenfield.
