= Potash Creek (Black River tributary) =

Location
- Country: United States
- State: New York

Physical characteristics
- Mouth: Black River
  - location: Naumburg, New York
  - coordinates: 43°54′16″N 75°30′39″W
  - elevation: 722 ft (220 m)
- Basin size: 5.59 mi^{2} (14.5 km^{2})

Potash Creek flows into the Black River near Naumburg, New York.
