= Number Four Fire Tower =

Fire observation tower in northern New York state, US

Coordinates: 43.8549°N 75.1982°W

The Number Four Fire Tower was a fire observation station located southwest of Number Four in Lewis County, New York. In 1928, the Fisher Forestry Company with supervision from the Conservation Department built a 75-foot-tall (23 m) Aermotor Corporation LX25 tower, with ladders rather than stairs between the landings. The tower was owned and operated by the landowner until 1945 when the Conservation Department took over operation. Around 1960, the ladders were all replaced with stairs. In 1958, the piece of land that included the cabin and tower, was transferred from landowner to the state of New York. The tower was closed in the early 1980s, and was later dismantled and removed. The upper section of the tower was used to build the demonstration tower adjacent to the Lowville Department of Environmental Conservation office. Around 1984 the observer cabin was moved to Nicks Lake Campground. Nothing remains at the former tower site except for the tower footers.
