= Brantingham Lake =

- Jewel of the Adirondacks
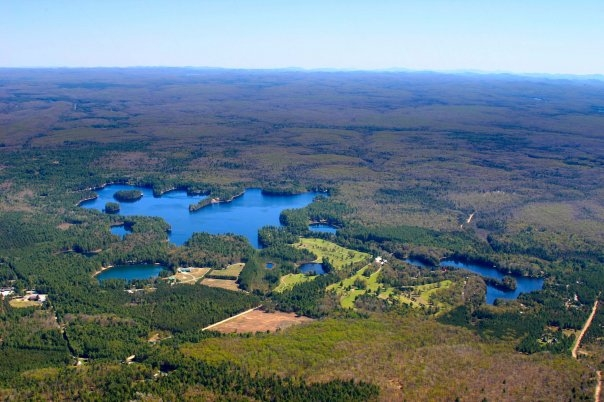

- Location within New York Location within the United States
- Coordinates: 43.6953502°N 75.2743755°W
- Type: Lake
- Surface area: 327 acres (1.32 km^{2})
- Average depth: 25 ft (7.6 m)
- Max. depth: 75 ft (23 m)
- Shore length^{1}: 11 miles (18 km)
- Surface elevation: 1,234 feet (376 m)
- Islands: 2 Round Island, Dark Island
- Settlements: Brantingham, New York
- ^{1} Shore length is not a well-defined measure.

Brantingham Lake is a 327-acre (1.32 km^{2}) in-land, non-section 10 Private lake, within the Adirondack Park, located east of Brantingham, New York in Lewis County, New York. Home to both seasonal and year-round residents. Surrounding area offer fishing, hunting, hiking, biking, as well as trails for all-terrain vehicle, horse, and snowmobile. There is no public beach. There is no official municipal, state or federal controlled public boat launch to access the lake. There is no parking available that allows a vehicle with a trailer to park. There are no bathroom facilities or public docks or New York State fishing rights. NYSDEC does not stock the lake due to no official designated boat launch. It is privately stocked by donation from property owners. During the winter months, the area receives an average 150 inches of snow, making Brantingham a popular destination for winter enthusiasts.

== History ==
Oneida Indians, who called the lake "Fish Lake", ceded most of the land in and around Brantingham to the newly forming government as the state of New York by formal treaty on February 22, 1788.

In 1793, Alexander Macomb made an application to purchase more than 3,500,000 acres (14,000 km^{2}) of land at six cents an acre, including all of Lewis County. On April 4, 1794, the land was sold to Thomas Hopper Brantingham of Philadelphia for $23,073, (forty-six cents an acre), however soon after, he executed three mortgages on the land, neglecting to make good on his debts, eventually it was sold again.

John Greig became the next to acquire the land on which Brantingham sits. Eventually, due to the past negative perception of Thomas Hooper Brantingham, the town that had been named after him was changed to Greig, honoring the new owner of the land. Even with this change, however, the lake and the surrounding hamlet have kept the name Brantingham.

An original and heavily shaded property along the lake is referred to as a "camp", a tradition that has persisted throughout the Adirondacks since the earliest homesteads because of the rustic characteristics of the settlements and the lifestyle. Inclusion of Brantingham Lake inside the boundary of the federal Adirondack Park system and its conservation has resulted in the preservation of those traditions and limitations of development. Cherished camps have become family heirlooms, passed from one generation to another. Many were not converted for winter occupation until recently, some remain unchanged from the summer retreats of the early 1900s.

== Geography ==
Brantingham Lake covers 341 acres (1.38 km^{2}) with eleven miles (18 km) of shoreline. The lake has a maximum depth of 70 feet, and an average depth of 30 feet in accordance with fluctuating yearly water levels. There are two islands present, Grant (or Round) Island, and Dark Island (about three times larger). Two distinct sand bars, each one marked by buoys and one visibly submerged sand bar stemming at the rear of Dark Island are visible. Depending on yearly water levels, these shallow sand bars may only be covered by a few feet of water, requiring caution from boaters. The lake bottom yields little vegetation, but rather is covered by organic matter and sand, making the lake favorable for recreational use during the summer months.

On the southwestern side of the lake, is an inlet leading to the portion of the lake that is referred to as the "Lily Pond". Two bridges cross this inlet: the wood walking bridge nearest Brantingham is a remnant from the Brantingham Hotel; and the concrete bridge where Cottage Road crosses the inlet. Both bridges are navigable by most motor boats, although the height is limited. At the farthest end of the Lily Pond (to the west of the base of "Shady Point", the name of both the camp and the peninsula upon which it sits) is a small concrete dam used to draw down lake levels from October to May in order to prevent shore erosion and damage to docks during the winter. The water traveling over that dam flows south to the Lake of the Pines, then down Fish Creek and eventually into the Black River.

A variety of fish are present in the lake such as Blue Gill, Rainbow Trout, Brook Trout, Brown Bullhead, Lake Whitefish, Largemouth Bass, Smallmouth Bass, Pumpkinseed Sunfish, Rock Bass, White Sucker, and Yellow Perch.

In 1995 a brief severe weather phenomenon, a microburst, caused heavy damage to lake properties and the surrounding landscape.

== Surrounding locations ==
- Catspaw Lake – A small lake (beaver pond) north of Brantingham with an abundance of small pickerel
- Glenfield – A hamlet west of Brantingham, at the Black River
- Greig – A town bordering the southwestern part of Brantingham
- Otter Creek – A creek and a hamlet of the same name, north of Greig

== Images ==
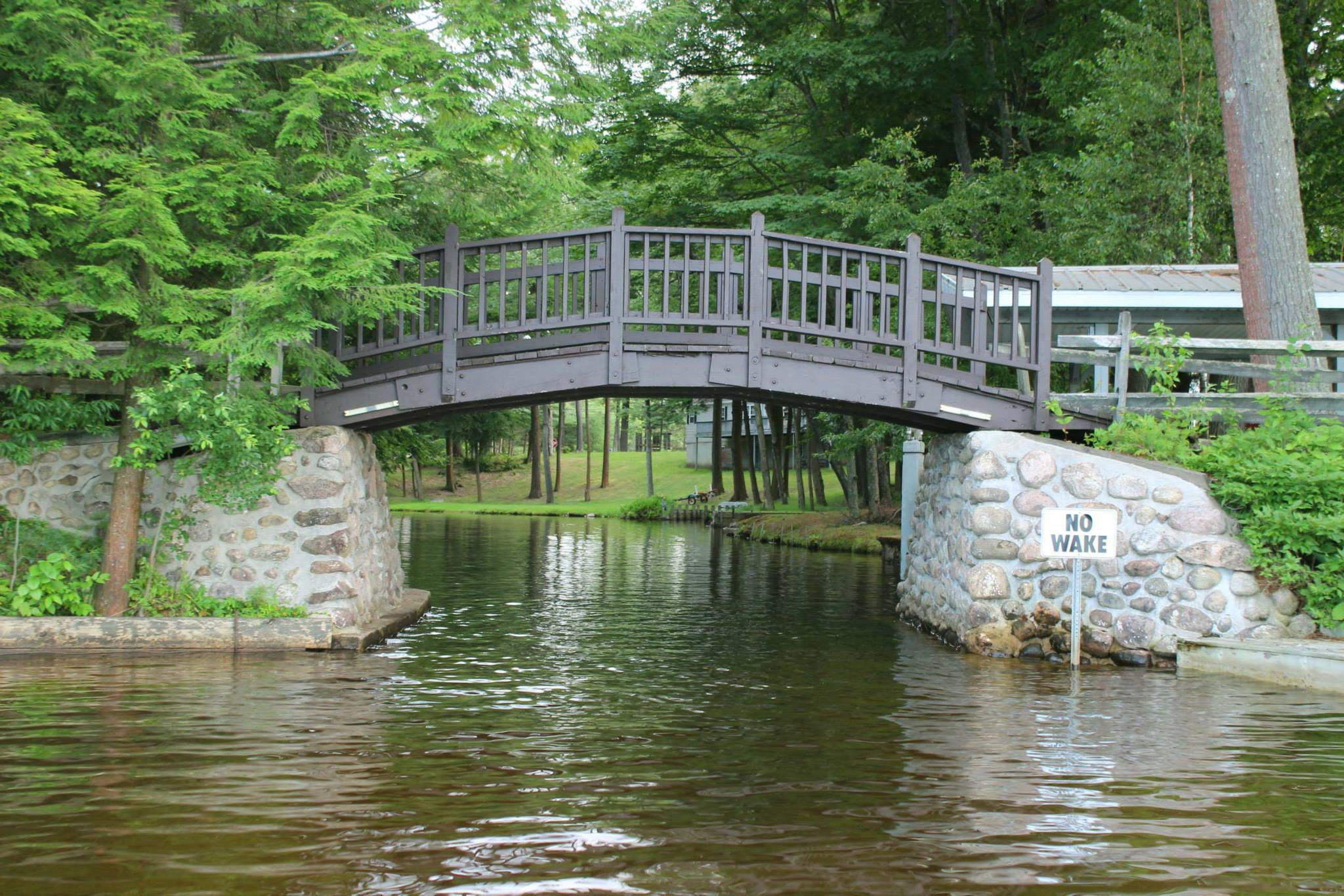
The arched Lily Pond Foot Bridge crosses its inlet on Brantingham Lake, New York

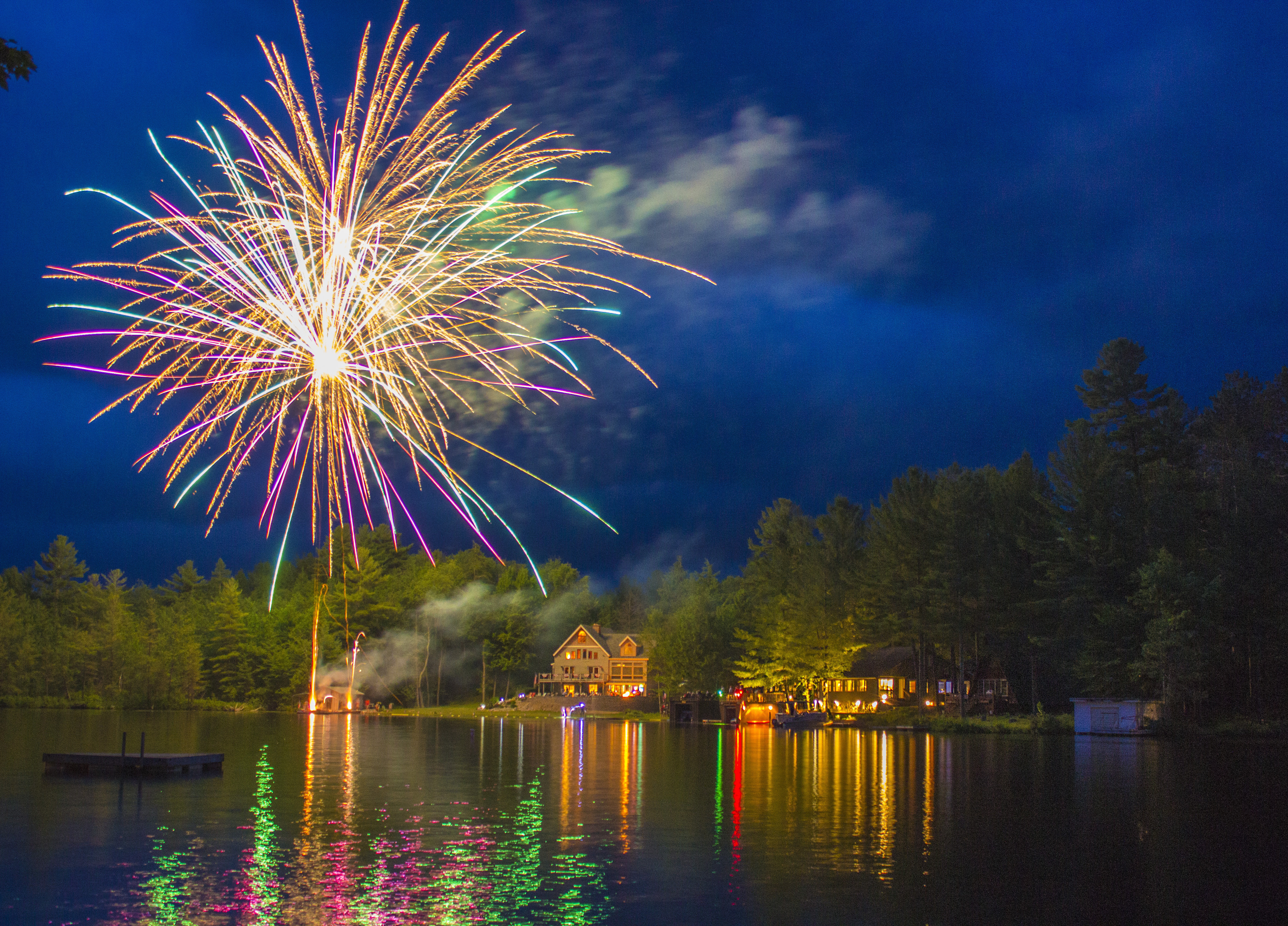
Fourth of July fireworks over Brantingham Lake

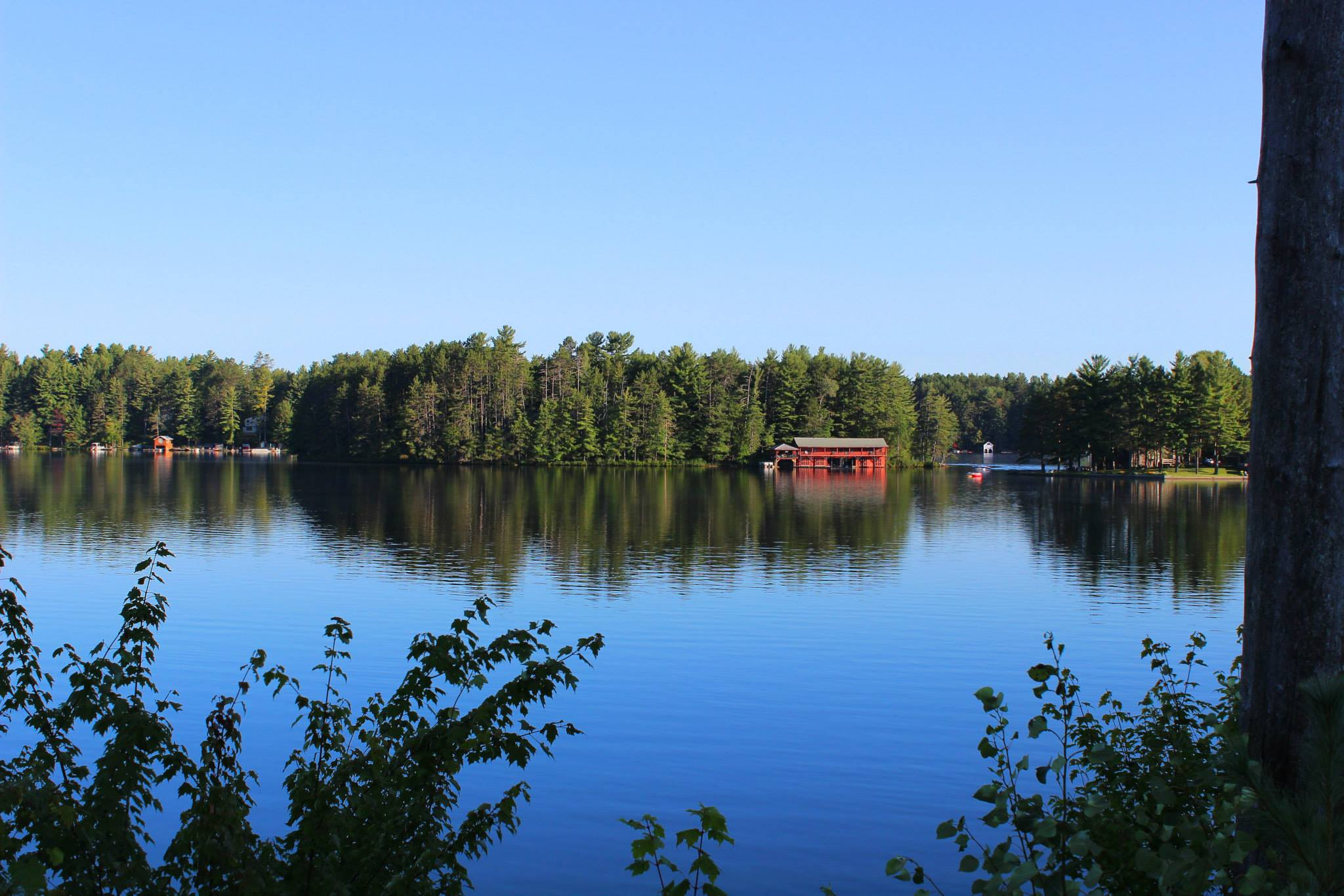
Dark Island in the distance across Brantingham Lake

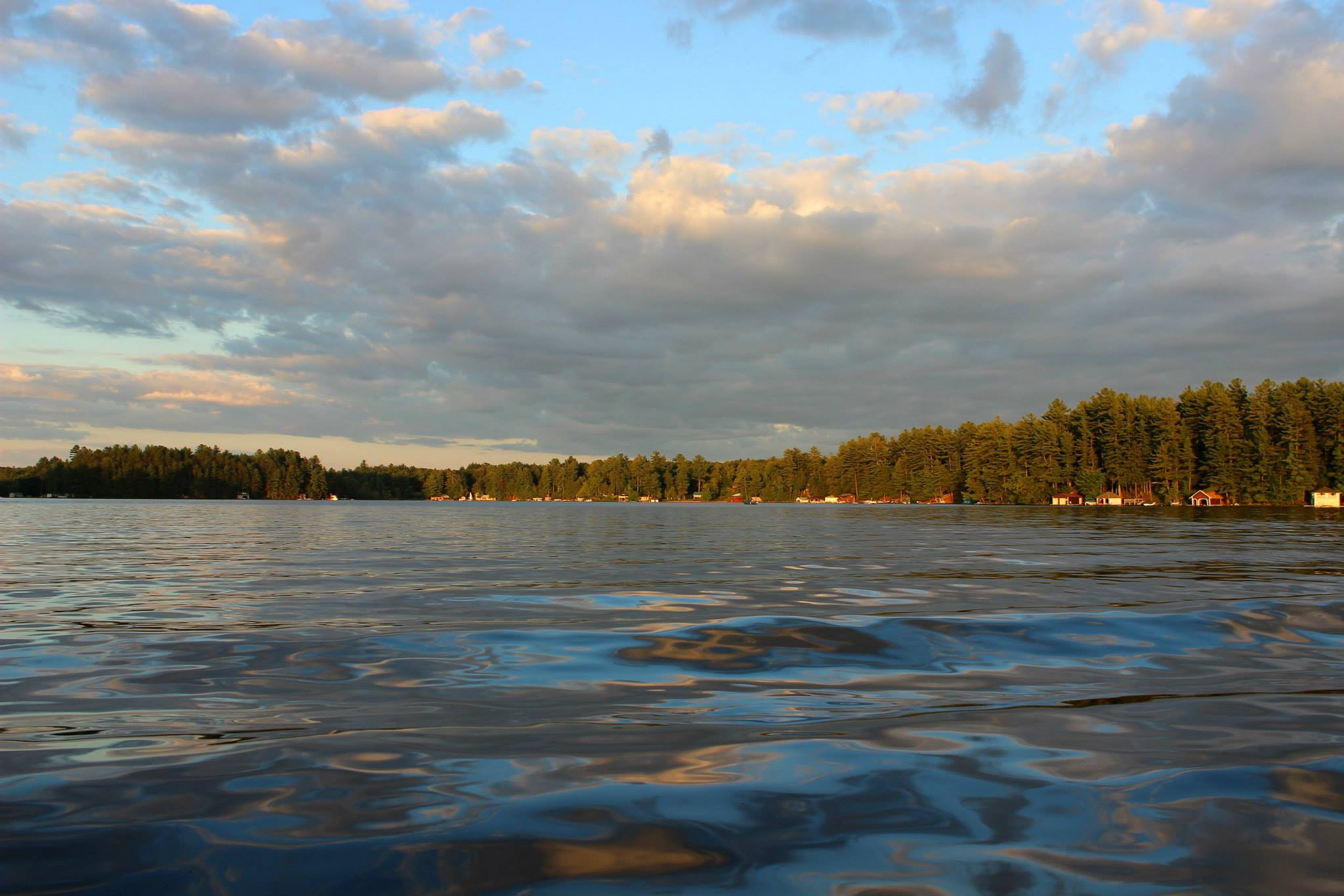
Dusk sky over Brantingham Lake

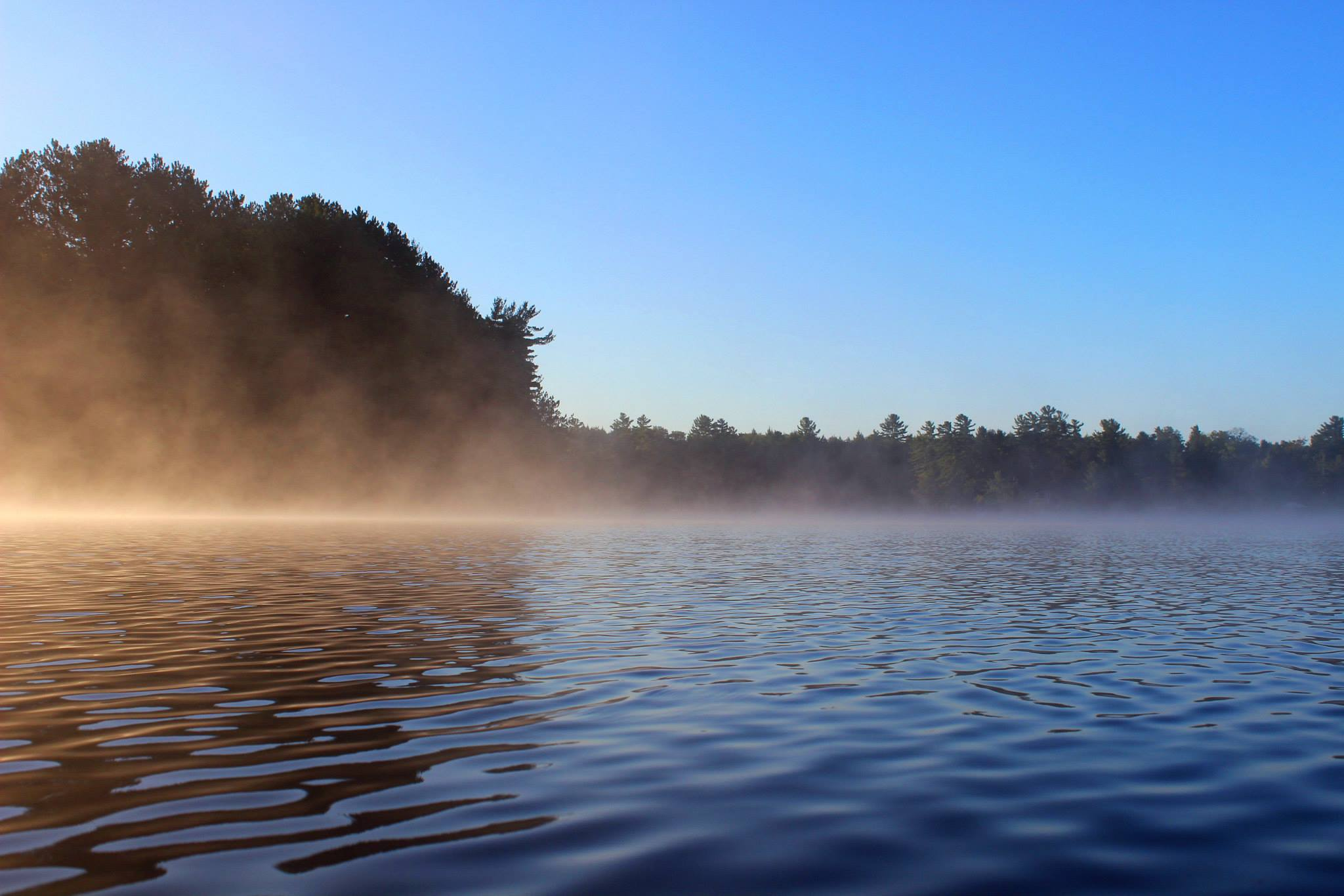
Morning mist on Brantingham Lake

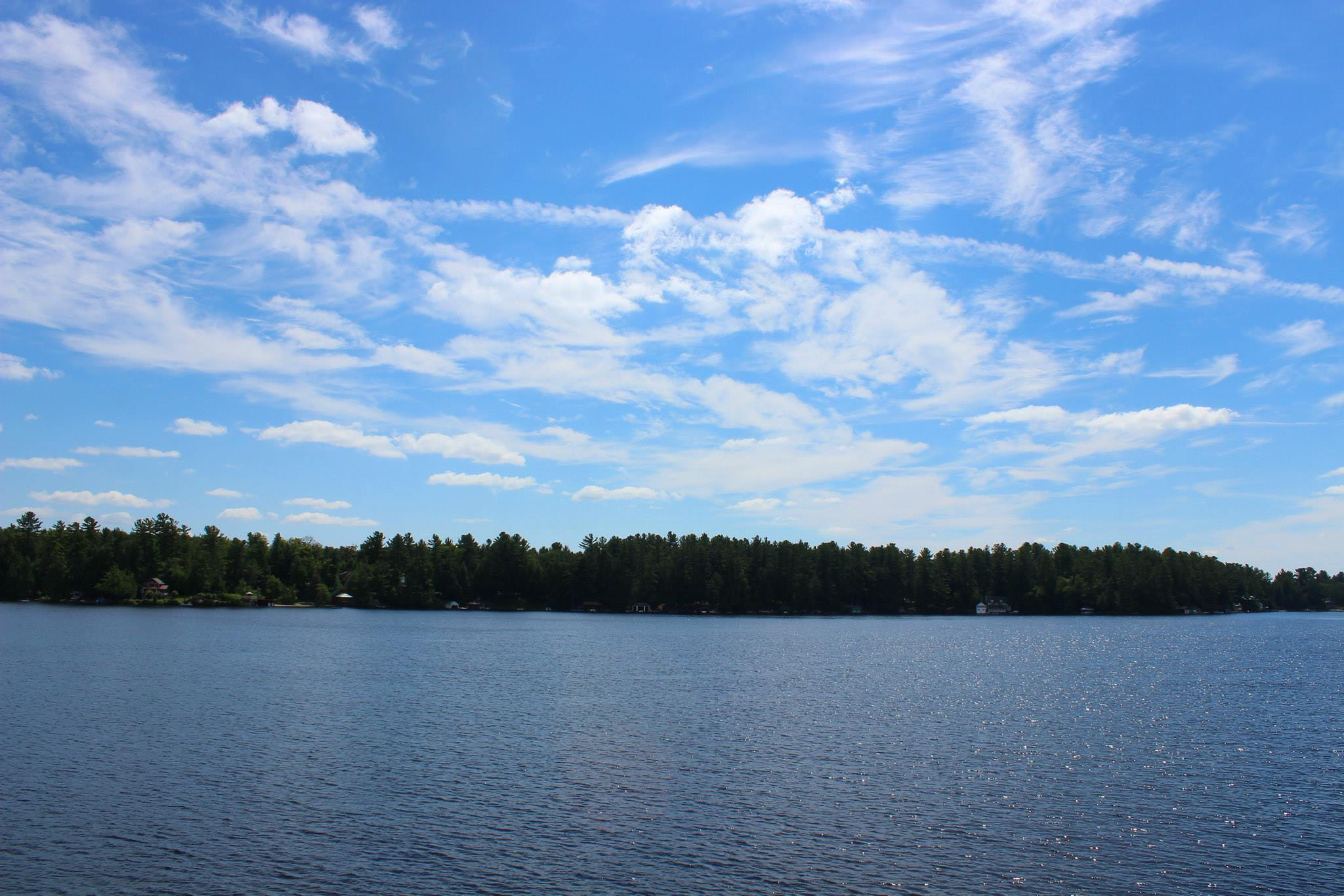
Summer sky over Brantingham Lake
