= Miller Brook =

Miller Brook may refer to:

- Miller Brook (Black River)
- Miller Brook (North Branch Mehoopany Creek)

== See also ==
- Miller Run
- Millers Brook
