= Otter Creek (Black River tributary) =

Location
- Country: United States
- State: New York

Physical characteristics
- Mouth: Black River
  - location: Glenfield, New York
  - coordinates: 43°43′08″N 75°22′42″W
  - elevation: 731 ft (223 m)
- Basin size: 65.8 mi^{2} (170 km^{2})

Otter Creek flows into the Black River near Glenfield, New York.
