= Kent Creek (Black River tributary) =

Location
- Country: United States
- State: New York

Physical characteristics
- Mouth: Black River
  - location: Hawkinsville, New York
  - coordinates: 43°29′09″N 75°15′39″W
  - elevation: 1,040 ft (320 m)
- Basin size: 10.7 mi^{2} (28 km^{2})

Kent Creek flows into the Black River near Hawkinsville, New York.
