= Mill Creek (Watson, Black River tributary) =

Creek in the U.S. state of New York

Location
- Country: United States
- State: New York

Physical characteristics
- Mouth: Black River
  - location: Watson, New York
  - coordinates: 43°46′56″N 75°27′04″W
  - elevation: 728 ft (222 m)
- Basin size: 33.9 mi^{2} (88 km^{2})

Mill Creek flows into the Black River in Watson, New York.
