= Fish Creek (Black River tributary) =

Location
- Country: United States
- State: New York

Physical characteristics
- Mouth: Black River
  - location: Greig, New York
  - coordinates: 43°40′01″N 75°22′01″W
  - elevation: 737 ft (225 m)
- Basin size: 23.6 mi^{2} (61 km^{2})

Fish Creek flows into the Black River near Greig, New York.
