= Kelsey Creek =

Kelsey Creek may refer to:

== Streams ==
- Kelsey Creek (Washington), a creek in Washington State, USA, that feeds Lake Washington
- Kelsey Creek (Lake County), a creek in Lake County, California, USA, that feeds Clear Lake
- Kelsey Creek (Black River tributary), a creek that flows into Black River (New York)

== Settlements ==
- Kelsey Creek, Queensland, a settlement in Queensland, Australia
- Kelseyville, California, formerly called Kelsey Creek
