= Swiss Creek (Black River tributary) =

Location
- Country: United States
- State: New York

Physical characteristics
- Mouth: Black River
  - location: Naumburg, New York
  - coordinates: 43°54′22″N 75°31′06″W
  - elevation: 718 ft (219 m)
- Basin size: 20.3 mi^{2} (53 km^{2})

Swiss Creek flows into the Black River near Naumburg, New York.
