= Otter Brook (Black River tributary) =

Location
- Country: United States
- State: New York

Physical characteristics
- Mouth: Black River
  - location: North Wilmurt, New York
  - coordinates: 43°28′41″N 75°00′34″W
  - elevation: 1,581 ft (482 m)
- Basin size: 3.61 mi^{2} (9.3 km^{2})

Otter Brook flows into the Black River near North Wilmurt, New York.
