= Remsen, New York =

- Town
- Location in Oneida County and the state of New York.

- Location of New York in the United States
- Coordinates: 43°19′39″N 75°11′12″W
- Country: United States
- State: New York
- County: Oneida

Government
  - Town Supervisor: Thomas H. McDonald Town Council: Duane Jones; Donna Hamilton; Thomas Murphy; Ryan Evans

Area
  - Total: 36.95 sq mi (95.71 km^{2})
  - Land: 35.47 sq mi (91.87 km^{2})
  - Water: 1.49 sq mi (3.85 km^{2})

Population (2010)
  - Total: 1,929
  - Estimate (2016): 1,903
  - Density: 53.6/sq mi (20.71/km^{2})
- Time zone: EST
  - Summer (DST): EDT
- ZIP Codes: 13438 (Remsen); 13338 (Forestport)
- FIPS code: 36-065-61126
- Website: remsenny.gov

Remsen is a town in Oneida County, New York, United States. The population was 1,929 at the 2010 census. The town is named after Henry Remsen, an early settler. The Town of Remsen contains a village also named Remsen. The town is north of the city of Utica.

== History ==
Remsen was named for Henry Remsen II, the original proprietor of the township and the inheritor of the Remsenburgh patent, which embraced some 48,000 acres (190 km^{2}) in Oneida and Herkimer counties and was granted in 1766 (later regranted by the Legislature in 1787) to Remsen and four other New York merchants. Remsen, a New York City merchant and owner of Henry Remsen Jr. & Co., was the descendant of some of the earliest Dutch settlers of New Amsterdam.

The town was first settled around 1792, when Barnabas Mitchell of Meriden, Connecticut settled in the area and began clearing a farm which was subsequently owned by his son Milo, and became known as the 'Milo Mitchell place.' Soon afterwards, Mitchell was joined by Nathaniel Rockwood, John Bonner, Perez Farr, Bettis Le Clerc, Jonah Dayton, John Kent and Shubael Cross, all of whom came from New England to settle in Remsen. In September 1795, five families from Wales settled in the vicinity, marking the beginning of a substantial Welsh presence in the area. The Town of Remsen was formed in 1798 from part of the Town of Norway in Herkimer County, New York when Oneida County was formed. In 1869, part of Remsen was used to form the new Town of Forestport.

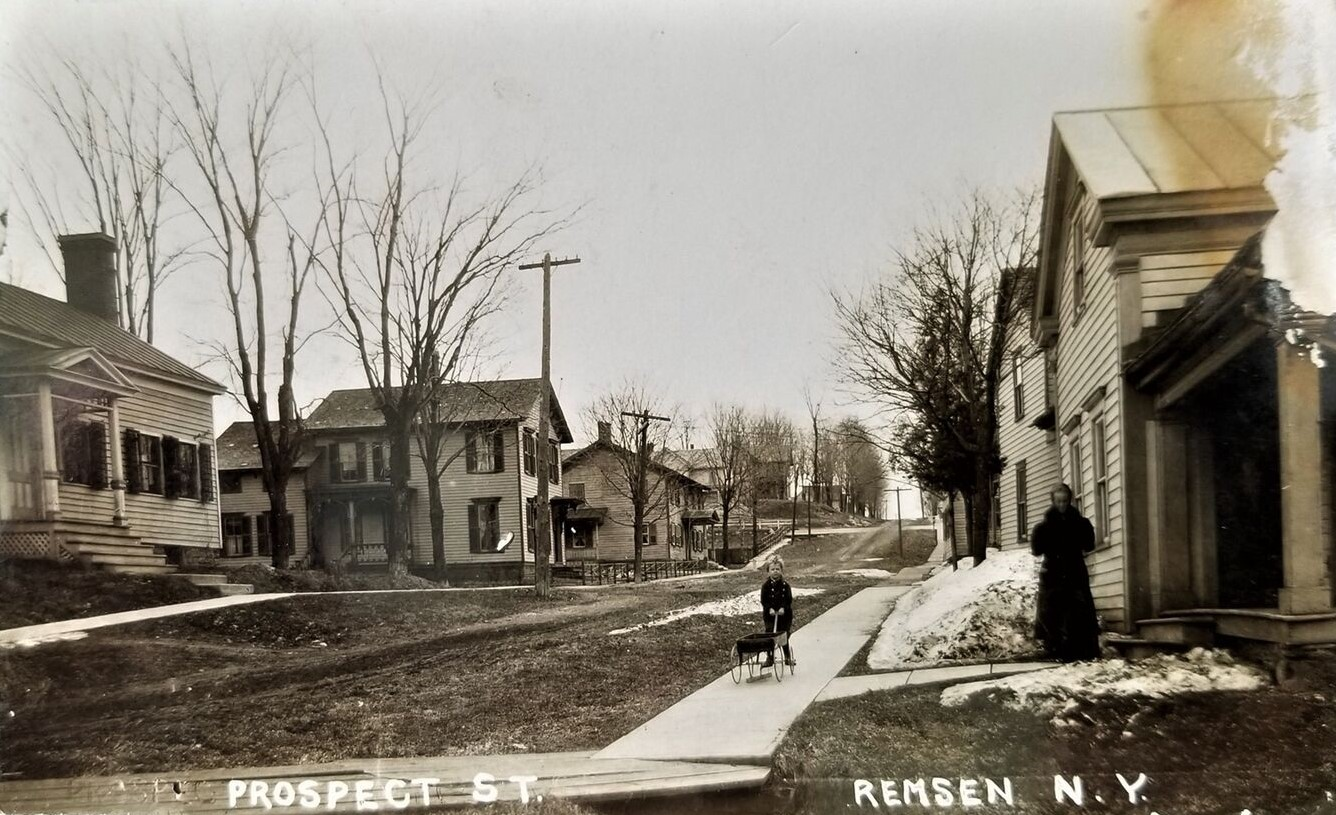
Remsen, New York on real photo postcard sent September 27, 1917

== Geography ==
According to the United States Census Bureau, the town has a total area of 36.9 sq mi (96 km^{2}), of which 35.4 sq mi (92 km^{2}) is land and 1.5 sq mi (3.9 km^{2}) (4.04%) is water.

The eastern town line is the border of Herkimer County. The Black River, widened into Kayuta Lake by a dam, defines the northern part of the town. Remsen is at the border of the Adirondack Park.

== Demographics ==
Historical population
Census	Pop.	Note	%±
1800	224		—
1810	489		118.3%
1820	912		86.5%
1830	1,400		53.5%
1840	1,638		17.0%
1850	2,384		45.5%
1860	2,070		−13.2%
1870	1,184		−42.8%
1880	1,195		0.9%
1890	1,099		−8.0%
1900	1,208		9.9%
1910	1,087		−10.0%
1920	969		−10.9%
1930	867		−10.5%
1940	798		−8.0%
1950	962		20.6%
1960	1,128		17.3%
1970	1,366		21.1%
1980	1,614		18.2%
1990	1,739		7.7%
2000	1,958		12.6%
2010	1,929		−1.5%
2016 (est.)	1,903	▼	−1.3%
U.S. Decennial Census

As of the census of 2000, there were 1,958 people, 745 households, and 517 families residing in the town. The population density was 55.3/sq mi (21.4/km^{2}). There were 991 housing units at an average density of 28.0/sq mi (10.8/km^{2}). The racial makeup of the town was 98.26% White, 0.36% Black or African American, 0.15% Native American, 0.41% Asian, and 0.82% from two or more races. Hispanic or Latino of any race were 0.15% of the population.

There were 745 households, out of which 36.2% had children under the age of 18 living with them, 54.1% were married couples living together, 11.5% had a female householder with no husband present, and 30.5% were non-families. 22.6% of all households were made up of individuals, and 9.1% had someone living alone who was 65 years of age or older. The average household size was 2.62 and the average family size was 3.12.

In the town, the population was spread out, with 28.1% under the age of 18, 7.3% from 18 to 24, 28.9% from 25 to 44, 24.9% from 45 to 64, and 10.9% who were 65 years of age or older. The median age was 36 years. For every 100 females, there were 99.8 males. For every 100 females age 18 and over, there were 99.2 males.

The median income for a household in the town was $34,968, and the median income for a family was $41,042. Males had a median income of $30,938 versus $22,989 for females. The per capita income for the town was $16,394. About 8.5% of families and 11.2% of the population were below the poverty line, including 10.5% of those under age 18 and 10.4% of those age 65 or over.

== Historic buildings ==
- Welsh Calvinistic Methodist Church (1831)

== Notable people ==
Erin Hamlin, the first American woman to win a luge World Championship title, at the 2009 championships, and the first American to win an Olympic medal in the luge singles competition, winning bronze in the 2014 Winter Olympics in Sochi, Russia.

Major General Baron von Steuben is interred in Remsen at the Steuben Memorial State Historic Site which was listed on the National Register of Historic Places in 1986.

William Carey Jones, the 2nd Attorney General of Washington, was born in Remsen in 1855.

== Education ==
The majority of the town, including the portion of the village, is within the Remsen Central School District. Timothy Jenny serves as Superintendent of the District which includes Remsen Elementary (PK-6th grades), and Remsen Junior-Senior High (7th-12th grades). As of 2018, the student population of Remsen Elementary is 244, and Remsen Junior-Senior High is 205. The mascot of both schools is the Remsen Rams. School colors are black and orange. Remsen Junior-Senior High Athletic program competes in Class D of the New York State Public High School Athletic Association. Athletics offered are cross country (boys and girls), soccer (boys and girls), basketball (boys and girls), volleyball (girls), cheerleading (co-ed), baseball (boys), softball (girls), track and field (boys and girls).

Some parts of the town are in other school districts: Adirondack Central School District and Holland Patent Central School District.

== Communities and locations in the Town of Remsen ==
- Bailey Hills – An elevation located northwest of Ninety-six Corners.
- Bardwell Mill – A location east of Hennedaga, south of Kayuta Lake.
- Kayuta Lake – A lake partly in the northwestern part of the town.
- Hinckley Reservoir – A reservoir partly in the southeastern section of the town.
- Hennedaga – A hamlet in the northwestern part of the town.
- Ninety Five Hill – An elevation west-northwest of Ninety-six Corners.
- Ninety-six Corners – A hamlet on Route 365 near the eastern town line.
- Remsen – The Village of Remsen is in the southwestern part of the town.
