= Stony Lake (New York) =

Lake in Lewis County, New York, United States

- Location within New York Location within the United States
- Location: Lewis County, New York, United States
- Coordinates: 43°46′30″N 75°12′55″W
- Basin countries: United States
- Surface area: 77 acres (0.31 km^{2})
- Average depth: 8.5 feet (2.6 m)
- Max. depth: 21 feet (6.4 m)
- Shore length^{1}: 2 miles (3.2 km)
- Surface elevation: 1,335 feet (407 m)
- Islands: 5
- Settlements: Sperryville, New York
- ^{1} Shore length is not a well-defined measure.

Stony Lake is located east of Sperryville, New York in the Adirondack State Park. It is not a private lake and is regulated by the Adirondack Park Agency. The outlet creek of the lake flows into Beaver Meadow Creek. Fish species present in the lake are smallmouth bass, rock bass, pickerel, bluegill, largemouth bass, and sunfish.
