= Stony Creek (Black River tributary) =

Location
- Country: United States
- State: New York

Physical characteristics
- Mouth: Black River
  - location: Deer River, New York
  - coordinates: 43°55′09″N 75°32′29″W
  - elevation: 725 ft (221 m)
- Basin size: 9.19 mi^{2} (23.8 km^{2})

Stony Creek flows into the Black River near Deer River, New York.
