= Mill Creek (Boonville, Black River tributary) =

Creek in New York state

Location
- Country: United States
- State: New York

Physical characteristics
- Mouth: Black River
  - location: Boonville, New York
  - coordinates: 43°31′02″N 75°19′05″W
  - elevation: 910 ft (280 m)
- Basin size: 9.61 mi^{2} (24.9 km^{2})

Mill Creek flows into the Black River near Boonville, New York.
