= South Lake (New York) =

Lake near Atwell, New York

- Location within New York South Lake (the United States)
- Location: Herkimer County, New York, United States
- Coordinates: 43°30′36″N 74°53′08″W
- Type: Lake
- Primary outflows: South Branch Black River
- Basin countries: United States
- Surface area: 495 acres (2.00 km^{2})
- Average depth: 19 feet (5.8 m)
- Max. depth: 60 feet (18 m)
- Shore length^{1}: 9 miles (14 km)
- Surface elevation: 2,018 feet (615 m)
- Settlements: Atwell, New York
- ^{1} Shore length is not a well-defined measure.

South Lake is located near Atwell, New York and is the source of the South Branch Black River. South Lake is one of several Herkimer County lakes with a high acid content and is, therefore, not a big fish producer. The fish species present are brook trout and land-locked salmon. Boating is permitted. A canoe, rowboat or motorboat is needed to access the lake at the designated boat launch. The lake is a designated trout lake, so no ice fishing is allowed. The public is prohibited from trespassing on the private property exclusion areas around the camps. Private residents access their camps via a locked gate.
