= Twin Lakes Stream =

Location
- Country: United States
- State: New York

Physical characteristics
- Source: Twin Lakes
  - location: NE of North Wilmurt, New York
  - coordinates: 43°28′30″N 74°57′25″W
- Mouth: Black River
  - location: North Wilmurt, New York
  - coordinates: 43°27′13″N 75°01′58″W
  - elevation: 1,460 ft (450 m)
- Basin size: 13.7 mi^{2} (35 km^{2})

Twin Lakes Stream drains Twin Lakes and flows into the Black River near North Wilmurt, New York.
