= Felts Mills Creek =

Location
- Country: United States
- State: New York

Physical characteristics
- Mouth: Black River
  - location: Felts Mills, New York
  - coordinates: 44°01′22″N 75°45′47″W
  - elevation: 572 ft (174 m)
- Basin size: 21.6 mi^{2} (56 km^{2})

Felts Mills Creek is a creek that flows into the Black River in Felts Mills, New York. A parking area and access trail was opened in September 2008 as part of a conservation fund project commissioned by the New York state Department of Environmental Conservation.
