= Independence River =

Location
- Country: United States
- State: New York

Physical characteristics
- Mouth: Black River
  - location: Bushes Landing, New York
  - coordinates: 43°44′59″N 75°23′30″W
  - elevation: 730 ft (220 m)
- Basin size: 95.1 mi^{2} (246 km^{2})

The Independence River is a small mountain stream which originates near the western edge of Adirondack Park. Situated north of the Moose River and south of the Beaver River, it begins in Herkimer County and flows west into Lewis County, toward its confluence with the Black River in Watson, north of Lyons Falls and just south of Lowville.

The Independence was named by surveyor/engineer Pierre Pharoux in 1794, in honor of the national holiday.

== Whitewater Paddling ==
The Independence is considered an excellent run by whitewater kayakers and canoeists, with a long Class-V rapid called the "Fat Lady" near its end. In contrast to the nearby Beaver and Moose, the Independence has no dams; thus, its suitability for paddling is entirely dependent on rain.

== See also ==
- List of New York rivers
