= Harvey Creek (New York) =

Location
- Country: United States
- State: New York
- County: Lewis County

Physical characteristics
- Source
  - coordinates: 43°47′55″N 75°21′53″W
- Mouth: Black River
  - location: Bushes Landing, New York
  - coordinates: 43°46′32″N 75°24′41″W
  - elevation: 730 ft (220 m)
- Basin size: 2.93 mi^{2} (7.6 km^{2})

Harvey Creek flows into the Black River at Bushes Landing, about 1.5 mi (2.4 km) east of Watson, New York.
