= Greig, New York =

Greig, New York Brantingham
- Town
- Location within New York Location within the United States
- Coordinates: 43°41′50″N 75°18′45″W
- Country: United States
- State: New York
- County: Lewis
- Established as Brantingham: 1828
- Name changed to Greig: 1832

Area
  - Total: 94.36 sq mi (244.40 km^{2})
  - Land: 92.99 sq mi (240.85 km^{2})
  - Water: 1.37 sq mi (3.55 km^{2})
- Elevation: 1,237 ft (377 m)

Population (2010)
  - Total: 1,199
  - Estimate (2016): 1,206
  - Density: 13.0/sq mi (5.01/km^{2})
- Time zone: UTC-5 (Eastern (EST))
  - Summer (DST): UTC-4 (EDT)
- ZIP Codes: 13345 (Greig); 13312 (Brantingham); 13343 (Glenfield); 13368 (Lyons Falls)
- Area code: 315
- FIPS code: 36-049-30796
- GNIS feature ID: 979026
- Website: https://townofgreig.gov/

Greig is a town in Lewis County, New York, United States, named after Congressman John Greig. The town was founded in 1828 from land taken from the town of Watson. Originally named "Brantingham", the town changed to its present name in 1832. Brantingham still survives as a hamlet within the boundaries of Greig, as a postal identity and for Brantingham Lake, to the east of town. As of the 2010 census, the population of Greig was 1,199.

== Geography ==
According to the United States Census Bureau, the town has a total area of 94.4 square miles (244 km^{2}), of which 93.0 square miles (241 km^{2}) is land and 1.4 square miles (3.6 km^{2}), or 1.48%, are water.

The eastern town line is the border of Herkimer County, and the western town line is defined by the Black River.

The eastern half of the town is inside the Adirondack Park.

== Demographics ==
Historical population
Census	Pop.	Note	%±
1830	662		—
1840	592		−10.6%
1850	1,074		81.4%
1860	1,733		61.4%
1870	2,638		52.2%
1880	1,570		−40.5%
1890	1,481		−5.7%
1900	1,100		−25.7%
1910	807		−26.6%
1920	635		−21.3%
1930	821		29.3%
1940	747		−9.0%
1950	642		−14.1%
1960	693		7.9%
1970	774		11.7%
1980	1,115		44.1%
1990	1,323		18.7%
2000	1,365		3.2%
2010	1,199		−12.2%
2016 (est.)	1,206		0.6%
U.S. Decennial Census

As of the census of 2000, there were 1,365 people, 533 households, and 386 families residing in the town. The population density was 14.7 inhabitants per square mile (5.7/km^{2}). There were 1,260 housing units at an average density of 13.6 per square mile (5.3/km^{2}). The racial makeup of the town was 98.90% White, 0.07% Native American, 0.37% Asian, 0.07% Pacific Islander, and 0.59% from two or more races. Hispanic or Latino of any race were 0.59% of the population.

There were 533 households, out of which 30.2% had children under the age of 18 living with them, 60.6% were married couples living together, 6.8% had a female householder with no husband present, and 27.4% were non-families. 21.6% of all households were made up of individuals, and 9.8% had someone living alone who was 65 years of age or older. The average household size was 2.55 and the average family size was 2.93.

In the town, the population was spread out, with 24.8% under the age of 18, 6.0% from 18 to 24, 28.2% from 25 to 44, 26.4% from 45 to 64, and 14.6% who were 65 years of age or older. The median age was 40 years. For every 100 females, there were 99.9 males. For every 100 females age 18 and over, there were 97.7 males.

The median income for a household in the town was $35,179, and the median income for a family was $39,028. Males had a median income of $32,596 versus $22,857 for females. The per capita income for the town was $15,838. About 4.7% of families and 8.9% of the population were below the poverty line, including 4.7% of those under age 18 and 10.8% of those age 65 or over.

== Communities and locations in Greig ==
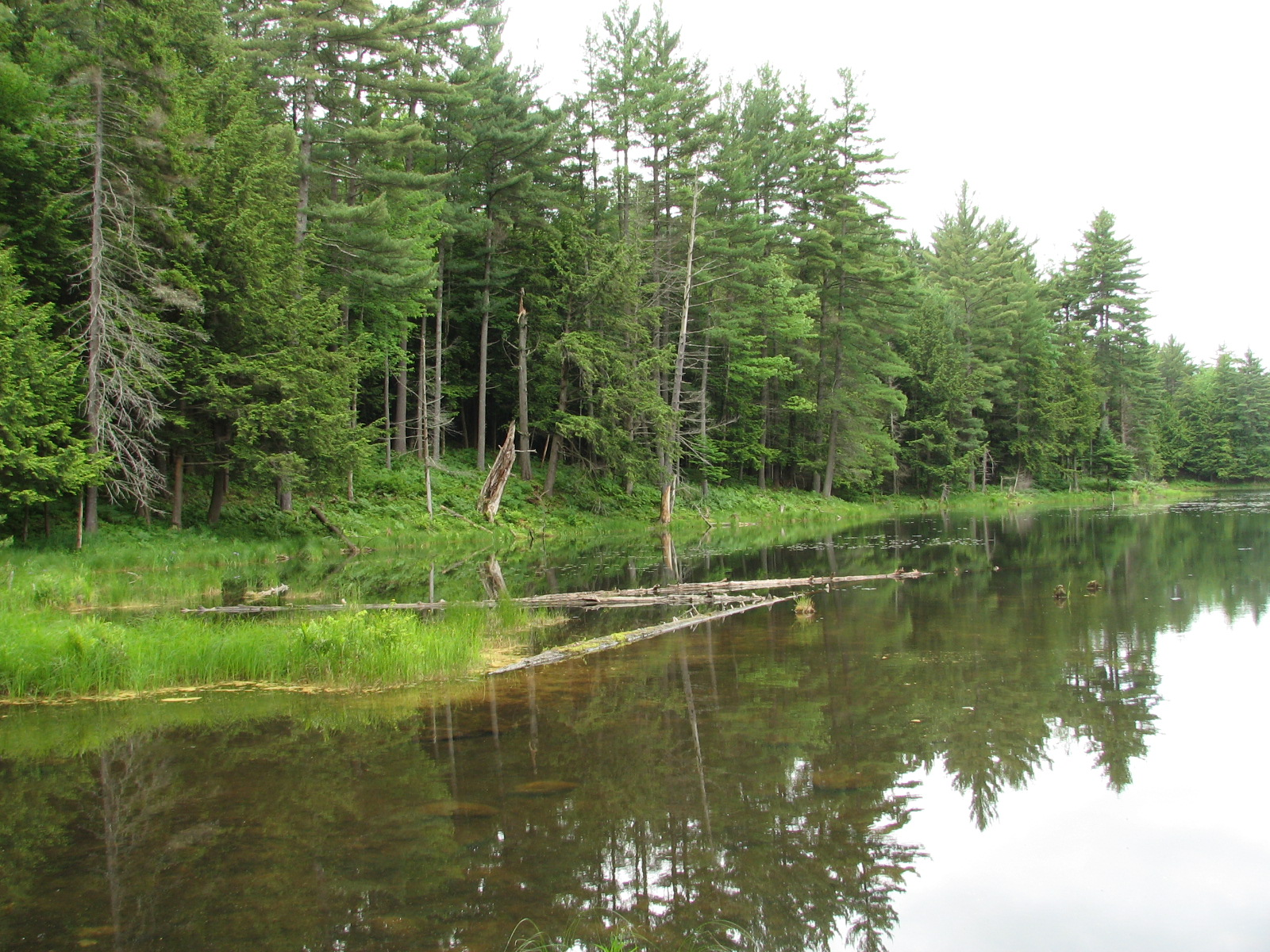
Catspaw Lake

- Brantingham – A hamlet near the center of the town, located inside the Adirondack Park.
- Brantingham Lake – A lake east of Brantingham and its residences.
- Catspaw Lake – A small lake north of Brantingham and its residences.
- Little Pine Lake – A small lake located south of Pine Lake.
- East Pine Pond – A 13 acre pond located east of Pine Lake.
- Glenfield – A hamlet at the western town line, at the Black River.
- Greig – The hamlet of Greig is in the southwestern part of the town.
- Otter Creek – A hamlet in the northwestern part of the town, north of Greig village.
- Pine Lake – A lake located east of Brantingham, near the eastern town line.
