= Negro Creek (Black River tributary) =

Location
- Country: United States
- State: New York

Physical characteristics
- Mouth: Black River
  - location: Castorland, New York
  - coordinates: 43°53′19″N 75°30′07″W
  - elevation: 721 ft (220 m)
- Basin size: 11.9 mi^{2} (31 km^{2})

Negro Creek flows into the Black River in Castorland, New York.
