= High Falls Pond =

- Location within New York High Falls Pond (the United States)
- Location: Lewis County, New York, United States
- Coordinates: 43°55′41″N 75°21′59″W
- Type: Lake
- Primary inflows: Beaver River, Balsam Creek
- Primary outflows: Beaver River
- Basin countries: United States
- Surface area: 156 acres (0.63 km^{2})
- Average depth: 13 feet (4.0 m)
- Max. depth: 40 feet (12 m)
- Shore length^{1}: 9.7 miles (15.6 km)
- Surface elevation: 912 feet (278 m)
- Islands: 10
- Settlements: High Falls, New York
- ^{1} Shore length is not a well-defined measure.

High Falls Pond is a lake located by High Falls, New York. Fish species present in the lake are rainbow trout, white sucker, brook trout, smallmouth bass, rock bass, yellow perch, and black bullhead. There is a carry down on Old State Road, on the north shore.
