= Crystal Creek (Black River tributary) =

Location
- Country: United States
- State: New York
- Region: Lewis County

Physical characteristics
- Source: Stewart Pond
  - coordinates: 43°49′53″N 75°16′11″W
  - elevation: 1,250 ft (380 m)
- Mouth: Black River
  - location: New Bremen, New York
  - coordinates: 43°49′49″N 75°28′11″W
  - elevation: 725 ft (221 m)
- Basin size: 26.4 mi^{2} (68 km^{2})

Crystal Creek is a stream in Lewis County, New York, USA. The stream flows into the Black River near New Bremen.
