= Pine Lake (Lewis County, New York) =

- Location within New York Pine Lake (the United States)
- Location: Lewis County, New York, United States
- Coordinates: 43°42′18″N 75°08′48″W
- Type: Lake
- Basin countries: United States
- Surface area: 66 acres (0.27 km^{2})
- Average depth: 5 feet (1.5 m)
- Max. depth: 13 feet (4.0 m)
- Shore length^{1}: 1.8 miles (2.9 km)
- Surface elevation: 1,545 feet (471 m)
- Islands: 2
- Settlements: Brantingham, New York
- ^{1} Shore length is not a well-defined measure.

Pine Lake is located east of Brantingham, New York. The outlet creek flows into Middle Branch. Fish species present in the lake are brook trout, brown trout, black bullhead, white sucker, and sunfish. There is access to the lake via trail on its north and west shore. No motors are allowed on this lake.

== Tributaries and locations ==
- East Pine Pond – A small 13 acre pond located east of Pine Lake. The outlet creek flows into Pine Lake. The pond has two islands. Fish species in East Pine Pond are brook trout, white sucker, black bullhead, and sunfish. Access to East Pine Pond via trail from Pine Lake. No motors are allowed on East Pine Pond.
