= Doe Pond (Big Moose, New York) =

Lake in Herkimer County, New York, US

- Location of Doe Pond within New York
- Location: Herkimer County, New York
- Coordinates: 43°47′42″N 74°57′18″W
- Basin countries: United States
- Surface area: 7 acres (0.011 mi^{2}; 2.8 ha)
- Surface elevation: 1,962 feet (598 m)
- Settlements: Old Forge

Doe Pond is a small lake north-northeast of Old Forge in Herkimer County, New York. It drains northwest via an unnamed creek that flows into the Independence River.

== See also ==
- List of lakes in New York
