= Mill Creek (Lyons Falls, Black River tributary) =

Location
- Country: United States
- State: New York

Physical characteristics
- Mouth: Black River
  - location: Lyons Falls, New York
  - coordinates: 43°38′12″N 75°22′21″W
  - elevation: 735 ft (224 m)
- Basin size: 7.24 mi^{2} (18.8 km^{2})

Mill Creek flows into the Black River near Lyons Falls, New York.
