= Forty Mountain =

Mountain in New York, United States

- Location within New York Location within the United States

Highest point
- Elevation: 1,814 feet (553 m)
- Coordinates: 43°25′23″N 74°59′56″W

Geography
- Location: Herkimer County, New York, U.S.
- Topo map: USGS Black Creek Lake

Forty Mountain is a mountain located in the Town of Ohio in Herkimer County, New York. The Forty Mountain Trail is a hiking trail that leads to Forty Mountain. North Branch Little Black Creek flows to the south of Forty Mountain.
