= Capidon Creek =

Location
- Country: United States
- State: New York

Physical characteristics
- Mouth: Black River
  - location: New Bremen, New York
  - coordinates: 43°51′30″N 75°28′42″W
  - elevation: 729 ft (222 m)
- Basin size: 6.67 mi^{2} (17.3 km^{2})

Capidon Creek flows into the Black River near New Bremen, New York.
