= Douglass Creek (New York) =

Location
- Country: United States
- State: New York

Physical characteristics
- Mouth: Black River
  - location: Greig, New York
  - coordinates: 43°41′08″N 75°22′16″W
  - elevation: 735 ft (224 m)
- Basin size: 4.63 mi^{2} (12.0 km^{2})

Douglass Creek flows into the Black River near Greig, New York.
