= Little Pine Lake =

Lake in Lewis County, New York, United States

- Location within New York Little Pine Lake (the United States)
- Location: Lewis County, New York, United States
- Coordinates: 43°40′57″N 75°08′50″W
- Basin countries: United States
- Surface area: 12 acres (0.049 km^{2})
- Average depth: 4 feet (1.2 m)
- Max. depth: 11 feet (3.4 m)
- Shore length^{1}: 1.2 miles (1.9 km)
- Surface elevation: 1,526 feet (465 m)
- Settlements: Brantingham, New York
- ^{1} Shore length is not a well-defined measure.

Little Pine Lake is located east of Brantingham, New York. The outlet creek flows into Middle Branch. Fish species present in the lake are brook trout, black bullhead, white sucker, and sunfish. No motors are allowed on this lake.
