= Ninety Five Hill =

Mountain in New York, United States

- Location within New York Location within the United States

Highest point
- Elevation: 1,499 feet (457 m)
- Coordinates: 43°21′04″N 75°07′19″W

Geography
- Location: WNW of Ninety Six Corners, New York, U.S.
- Topo map: USGS Hinckley

Ninety Five Hill is a summit located in Central New York Region of New York located in the Town of Remsen in Oneida County, west-northwest of Ninety Six Corners.
