= Hodge Creek =

Location
- Country: United States
- State: New York

Physical characteristics
- Mouth: Black River
  - location: Bushes Landing, New York
  - coordinates: 43°46′39″N 75°25′10″W
  - elevation: 751 ft (229 m)
- Basin size: 2.5 mi^{2} (6.5 km^{2})

Hodge Creek flows into the Black River near Bushes Landing, New York.
