= Fall Brook (Black River tributary) =

Location
- Country: United States
- State: New York

Physical characteristics
- Mouth: Black River
  - location: Port Leyden, New York
  - coordinates: 43°32′54″N 75°19′19″W
  - elevation: 869 ft (265 m)
- Basin size: 11.8 mi^{2} (31 km^{2})

Fall Brook flows into the Black River near Port Leyden, New York.
