= North Branch Sugar River (New York) =

Location
- Country: United States
- State: New York

Physical characteristics
- Mouth: Sugar River
  - location: Constableville, New York
  - coordinates: 43°33′45″N 75°27′17″W
  - elevation: 1,352 ft (412 m)

North Branch Sugar River flows into the Sugar River west of Constableville, New York.
