= Francis Lake (New York) =

Lake in Lewis County, New York, United States

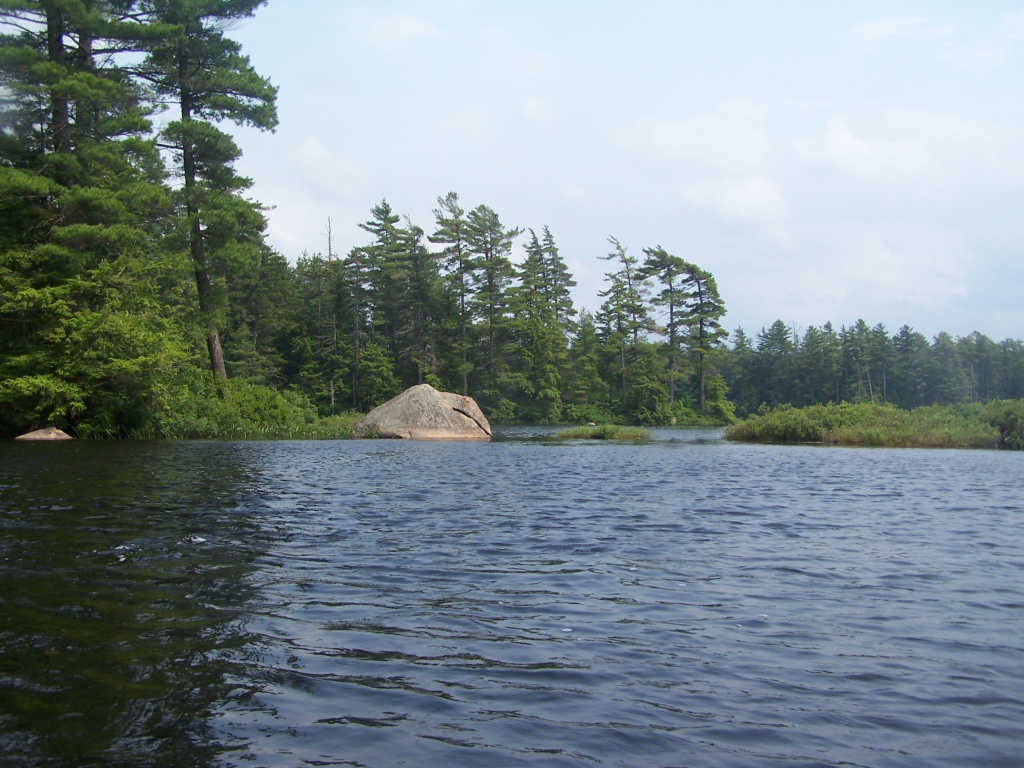
- Francis Lake by 2011

- Location within New York Location within the United States
- Location: Lewis County, New York, United States
- Coordinates: 43°51′09″N 75°10′17″W
- Basin countries: United States
- Surface area: 134 acres (0.54 km^{2})
- Average depth: 5 feet (1.5 m)
- Max. depth: 18 feet (5.5 m)
- Shore length^{1}: 3.4 miles (5.5 km)
- Surface elevation: 1,443 feet (440 m)
- Islands: 3
- Settlements: Number Four, New York
- ^{1} Shore length is not a well-defined measure.

Francis Lake is located southeast of Number Four, New York. Fish species present in the lake are pickerel, yellow perch, and black bullhead. There is carry down on Number Four Road, off Route 26.
