= Pine Grove Community Church =

Historic church in New York, United States

- U.S. National Register of Historic Places
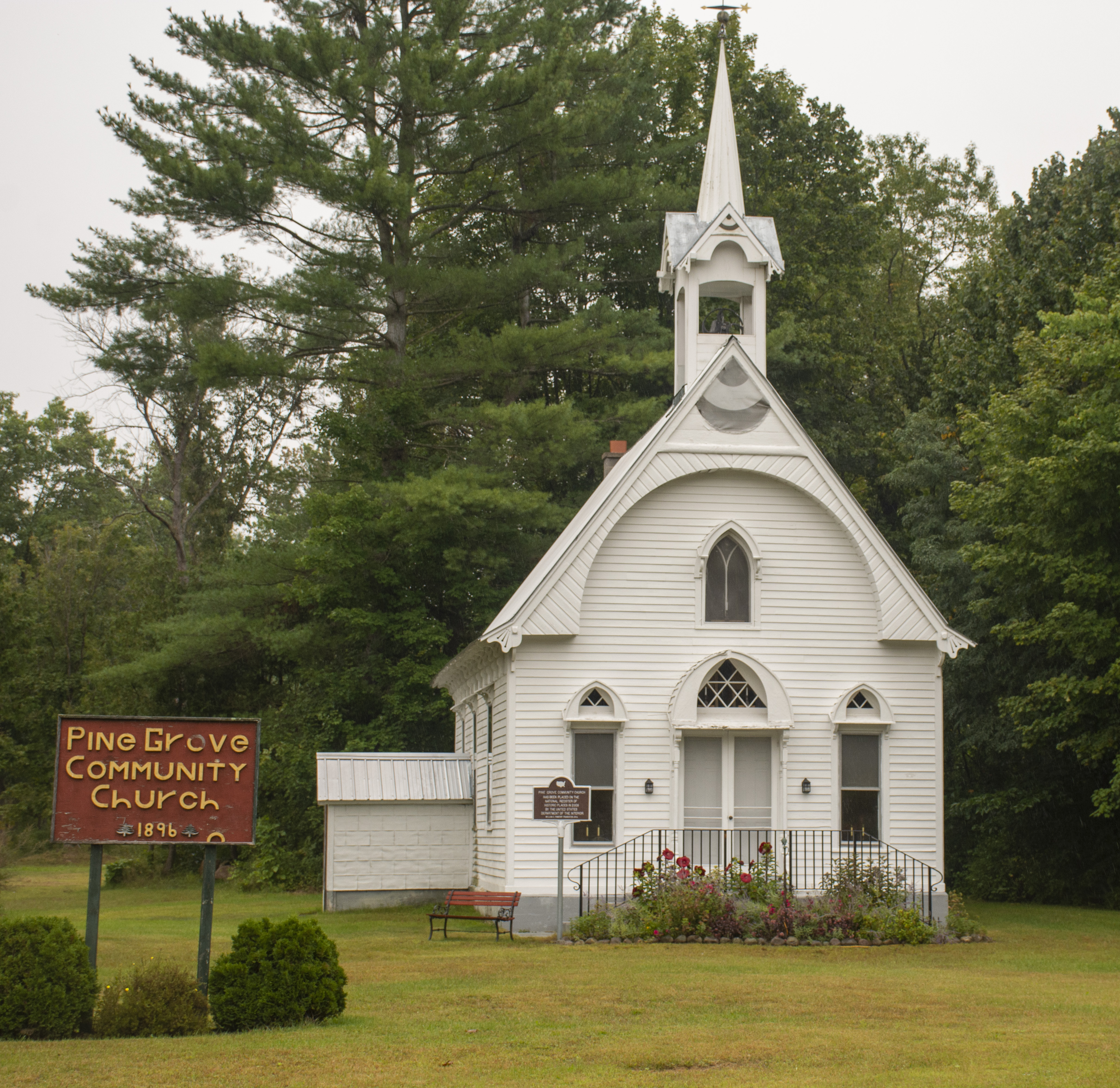

- Location within New York Location within the United States
- Location: Austin Rd. & Pine Grove Rd., Pine Grove, New York
- Coordinates: 43°45′6.6″N 75°22′38.54″W
- Area: 0.3 acres (0.12 ha)
- Built: 1895
- NRHP reference No.: 09000633
- Added to NRHP: August 20, 2009

Pine Grove Community Church is a historic non-denominational, Christian chapel located at Pine Grove in Lewis County, New York. It was built in 1895 and is a two-story, wood-frame building three bays in width and five bays deep. It features a projecting two-story bell tower attached to the center of the main block.

It was listed on the National Register of Historic Places in 2009.
