= Cold Brook (Oneida County, New York) =

- Location of mouth within New York Cold Brook (Oneida County, New York) (the United States)

Location
- Country: United States
- State: New York

Physical characteristics
- Source
  - coordinates: 43°29′46″N 75°13′32″W
- Mouth: Black River
  - location: Hawkinsville, New York
  - coordinates: 43°29′32″N 75°16′22″W
  - elevation: 1,043 ft (318 m)

Basin features
- Tributaries
  - left: Crystal Creek

Cold Brook flows into the Black River near Hawkinsville, New York.
