= Philomel Creek =

Creek in New York, USA

Location
- Country: United States
- State: New York

Physical characteristics
- Mouth: Black River
  - location: Watertown, New York
  - coordinates: 44°00′34″N 75°55′29″W
  - elevation: 321 ft (98 m)
- Basin size: 8.4 mi^{2} (22 km^{2})

Philomel Creek flows into the Black River near Watertown, New York, United States.
