= Croghan Island Mill =

- U.S. National Register of Historic Places
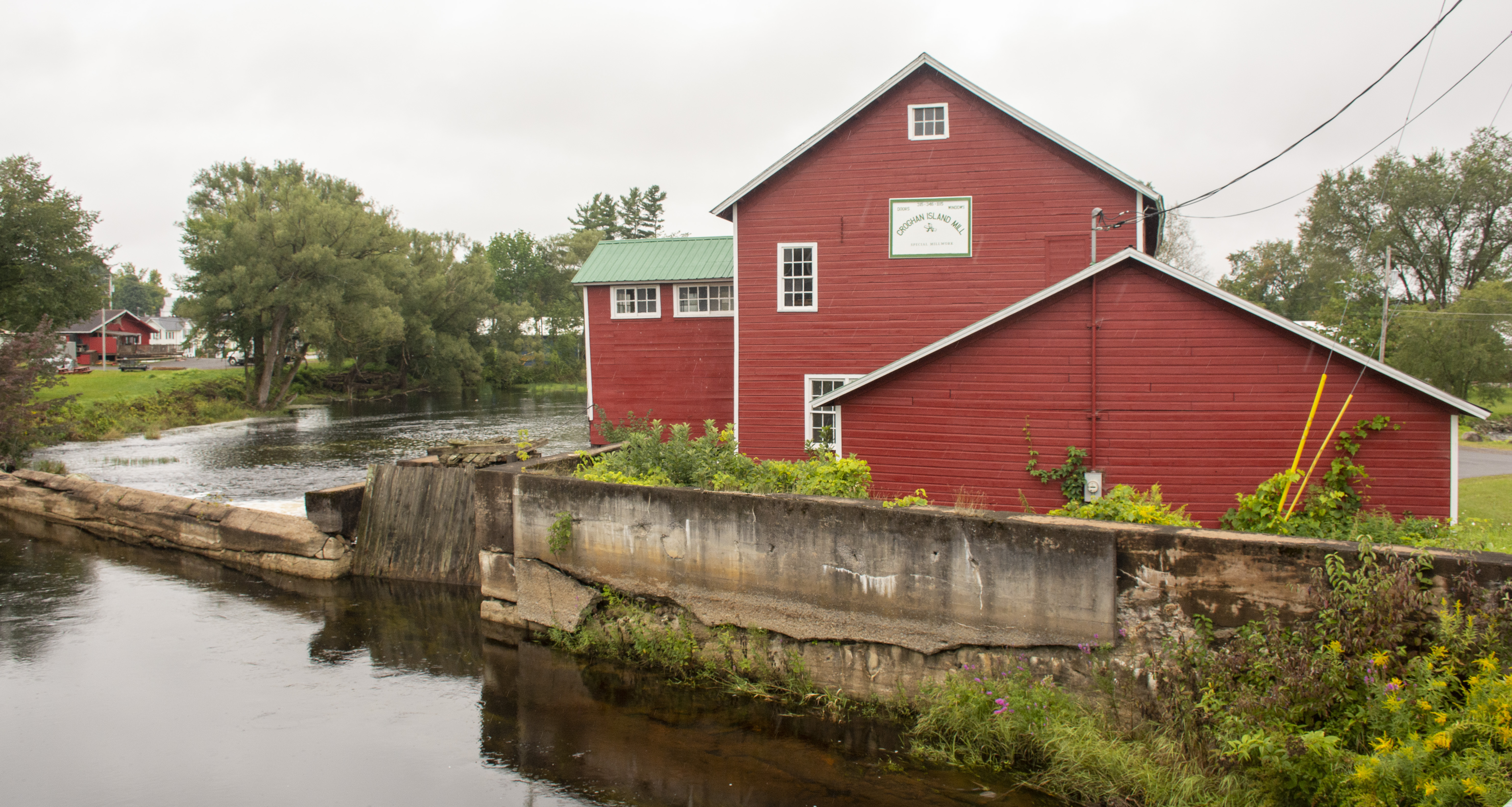

- Location within New York Location within the United States
- Location: 9897 South Bridge Street; Croghan, New York
- Coordinates: 43°53′52″N 75°23′37″W
- Area: 1.0 acre (0.40 ha)
- NRHP reference No.: 10000515
- Added to NRHP: July 30, 2010

Croghan Island Mill is a historic saw mill complex and concrete dam located near Croghan in Lewis County, New York. The mill complex consists of three blocks; the mill building main block, cold storage block, and office block. The main block is a five-by-three-bay, 2 1/2-story gable-roofed structure sheathed in clapboard, approximately 30 by 56 feet (9.1 by 17.1 m) in size. The cold storage block is a 1-story, gable-roofed addition to the north side of the main block. The office block is a 1 1/2-story, shed-roofed addition projecting south of the main block. The complex also includes the wheel house and flume box in a 1 1/2-story ell projecting off the main block. The concrete dam was built in 1906 and has an approximately 2-story drop.

The mill was listed on the National Register of Historic Places in 2010.

== See also ==
- Historic American Engineering Record (HAER) No. NY-546, "Croghan Island Mill, 9897 South Bridge Street, Croghan, Lewis County, NY", 22 photos, 2 data pages, 4 photo caption pages
