= Taylorville Reservoir =

- Location within New York
- Location: Lewis County, New York, United States
- Coordinates: 43°55′39″N 75°18′07″W
- Type: Reservoir
- Primary inflows: Beaver River
- Primary outflows: Beaver River
- Basin countries: United States
- Surface area: 93 acres (0.38 km^{2})
- Max. depth: 26 feet (7.9 m)
- Shore length^{1}: 5.5 miles (8.9 km)
- Surface elevation: 1,070 feet (330 m)
- Islands: 3
- Settlements: Belfort, New York
- ^{1} Shore length is not a well-defined measure.

Taylorville Reservoir is located east of Belfort, New York. Fish species present in the lake are pickerel, white sucker, yellow perch and black bullhead. There is carry down access near the dam on the west shore off Taylorville Road. There is also carry down access at Double Eddy on the north shore.
