= Twin Lakes (Black Creek Lake, Herkimer County, New York) =

Lakes in Herkimer County, New York, United States

- Location within New York Twin Lakes (the United States)
- Location: Herkimer County, New York
- Coordinates: 43°29′00″N 74°56′57″W
- Primary inflows: Twin Lakes Inlet
- Primary outflows: Twin Lakes Stream
- Basin countries: United States
- Surface elevation: 1,946 ft (593 m)
- Settlements: North Wilmurt, New York

Twin Lakes are two small lakes located northeast of North Wilmurt, New York.
