= Bailey Hills =

Mountain in New York, United States

- Location within New York Location within the United States

Highest point
- Elevation: 1,463 feet (446 m)
- Coordinates: 43°21′41″N 75°06′42″W

Geography
- Location: NW of Ninety Six Corners, New York, U.S.
- Topo map: USGS Hinckley

Bailey Hills is a summit located in Central New York Region of New York located in the Town of Remsen in Oneida County, northwest of Ninety Six Corners.
