= Trout Creek (Black River tributary) =

Location
- Country: United States
- State: New York

Physical characteristics
- Mouth: Black River
  - location: Dexter, New York
  - coordinates: 44°00′20″N 76°01′11″W
  - elevation: 265 ft (81 m)
- Basin size: 1.54 mi^{2} (4.0 km^{2})

Trout Creek flows into the Black River near Dexter, New York.
