= Croghan, New York =

- Town
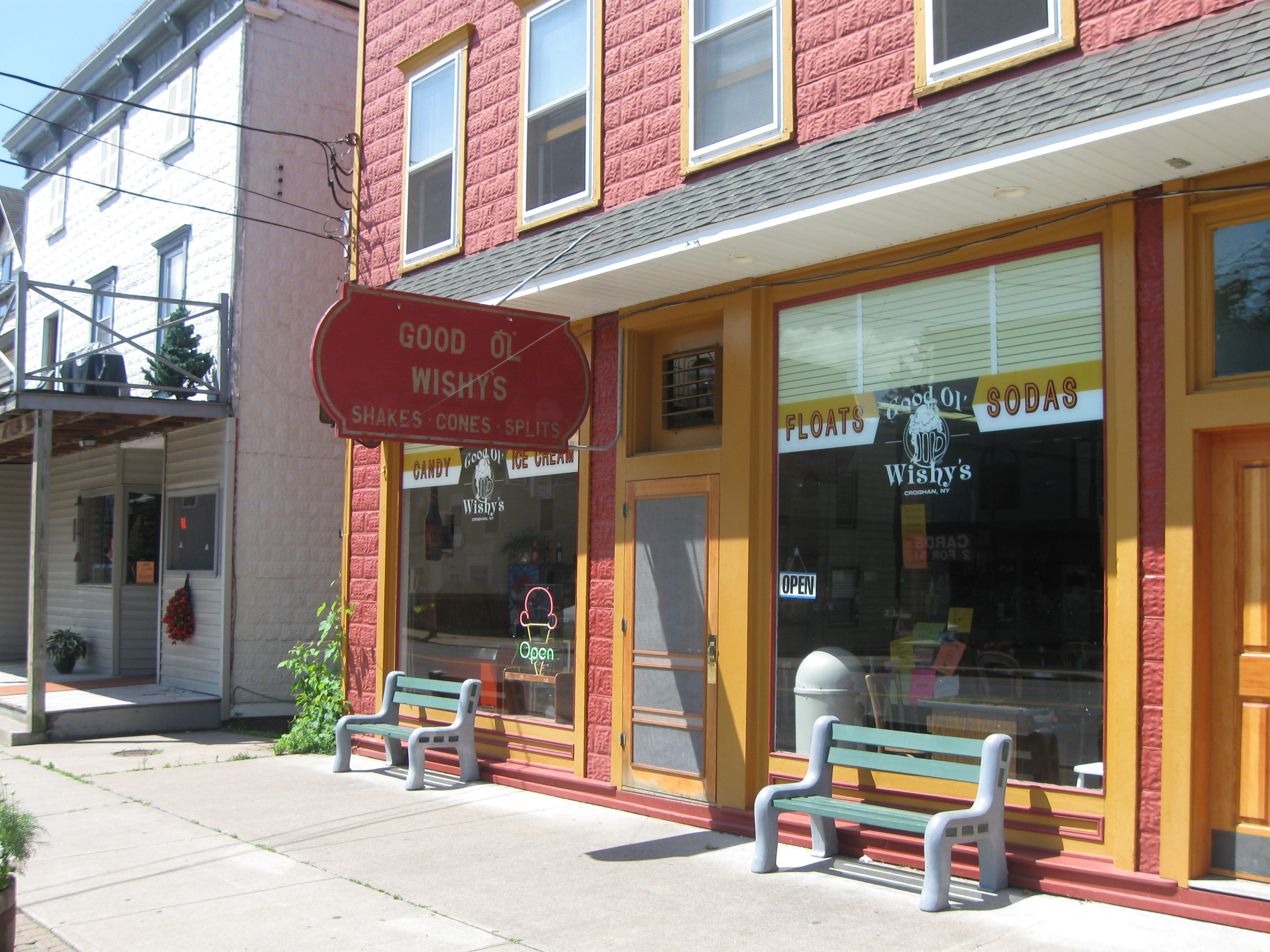
- Good Ol' Wishy's, a typical storefront

- Location in New York Location in the United States
- Coordinates: 43°58′13″N 75°21′24″W
- Country: United States
- State: New York
- County: Lewis

Area
  - Total: 182.03 sq mi (471.46 km^{2})
  - Land: 179.18 sq mi (464.08 km^{2})
  - Water: 2.85 sq mi (7.38 km^{2})
- Elevation: 994 ft (303 m)

Population (2010)
  - Total: 3,093
  - Estimate (2016): 3,082
  - Density: 17.2/sq mi (6.64/km^{2})
- Time zone: UTC-5 (Eastern (EST))
  - Summer (DST): UTC-4 (EDT)
- ZIP Codes: 13327 (Croghan); 13305 (Beaver Falls); 13619 (Carthage); 13620 (Castorland); 13665 (Natural Bridge)
- Area code: 315
- FIPS code: 36-049-19081
- GNIS feature ID: 978878
- Website: townofcroghan.gov

Croghan /ˈkroʊɡən/ is a town in Lewis County, New York, United States. The population was 3,093 at the 2010 census. The town is in the northern part of the county and located northeast of the county seat, Lowville. The town contains a village also named Croghan, a small part of which is located in the adjacent town of New Bremen. Both the village and town are locally pronounced \Krō-gun\ (with a hard g and silent h, emphasis on the first syllable).

== History ==
The southwestern part of the town was the locale of an ill-fated colony of refugees from the French Revolution. The settlements were disbanded by 1814. Modern settlement began circa 1830.

The town was formed in 1841 from the towns of Watson and Diana. In 1848, part of the town was used to help form New Bremen.

Theodore B. Basselin played a large part in Croghan's history. Mr. Basselin came to America and settled in Croghan, where he became the town's first millionaire due to his successful logging business. He was one of the town's top employers in his day.

The beautiful Basselin mansion still stands in downtown Croghan. Basselin was responsible for a few other landmarks in the town. The Croghan Library that was once the Basselin Opera House stands down the road from the Basselin mansion.

Also next to the library is the Basselin Cemetery. The American Maple Museum, which is located next to St. Stephen's church, was originally the Father Leo Memorial School. The school was built from the funds of the Basselin estate.

The Croghan Island Mill was listed on the National Register of Historic Places in 2010.

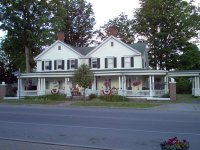
Basselin

== 1912 fire ==
The second great Croghan fire occurred on May 1, 1912. The fire caused considerable damage to the downtown business district of the village. 32 buildings were destroyed by the flames, with the total damage estimated to have been about $600,000.

Two children, who lived in the building where the fire started, died. The fire was so large that assistance had to be provided by the Lowville Fire Department, who sent a train into town with supplies and men.

The fire had its origin in a backyard bonfire which accidentally made its way into the Grounert Café building where two children of the family were trapped in the smoke-filled building. The children were eventually rescued from the blaze, but both died almost immediately afterwards.

The firefighters, who were excited by the rescue, underestimated the danger of the fire to spread to nearby structures. Most of the buildings at the time were wooden structures, which allowed the fire to spread quickly from building to building. The spreading happened so quickly that firefighters were driven from the hydrants with no time to shut them off. This weakened the water pressure significantly, which later handicapped the effort to stop the blaze.

The fire had crossed the street, setting both sides ablaze. 32 buildings were destroyed, including the post office, a general store, Peter Shinbourne's Shoe factory, William Ritz's Café, Raymond Lee's five and ten cent store, Norman Martin's hotel and many people's homes.

On the other side of the street, Monett's store, many more homes, the Town Hall, Honsicker's Meat Market, S.E. Simon's Drug Store, and Marilley's General Store were also destroyed. Marilley's Store alone lost an estimated $50,000 in damages. The Town Hall and Opera House had both been recently remodeled at large expense.

The local fire department realized that they needed assistance and made a call for help to Lowville. A train was sent with a chemical engine, 1,500 feet (460 m) of hose and a company of fifteen firemen. Much of the hose was lost because it could not be disconnected from the hydrants in time.

The Farney & Steiner and Virkler feed and grist mills were destroyed along with much value in machinery. One of the mill owners lost about $200,000. The fire was eventually stopped after firefighters concentrated their efforts.

The fire ended just short of St. Stephen's Roman Catholic Church. The Franciscan monastery with the large school building connected with it was also saved. On the opposite side of the street the blaze stopped at the Basselin Mansion, both of which still stand there today.

== Geography ==
According to the United States Census Bureau, the town has a total area of 182.1 square miles (471.5 km^{2}), of which 179.4 square miles (464.7 km^{2}) are land and 2.7 square miles (6.9 km^{2}) (1.46%) are water.

The western town line consists partly of the border of Jefferson County, and the eastern town line is the border of Herkimer County.

The Black River defines the western town line. The Indian River flows from the northwestern part of the town. The Beaver River flows through the southern part of Croghan.

New York State Route 812 is a north–south highway in the town. NY-812 intersects New York State Route 126 at the south town line. NY-126 intersects east–west highway New York State Route 410 by the western town line.

== Demographics ==
Historical population
| Census | Pop. | Note | %± |
|---|---|---|---|
| 1850 | 1,135 | | — |
| 1860 | 2,035 | | 79.3% |
| 1870 | 2,433 | | 19.6% |
| 1880 | 3,374 | | 38.7% |
| 1890 | 3,527 | | 4.5% |
| 1900 | 3,159 | | −10.4% |
| 1910 | 2,807 | | −11.1% |
| 1920 | 2,551 | | −9.1% |
| 1930 | 2,392 | | −6.2% |
| 1940 | 2,557 | | 6.9% |
| 1950 | 2,544 | | −0.5% |
| 1960 | 2,697 | | 6.0% |
| 1970 | 2,559 | | −5.1% |
| 1980 | 2,824 | | 10.4% |
| 1990 | 3,071 | | 8.7% |
| 2000 | 3,162 | | 3.0% |
| 2010 | 3,093 | | −2.2% |
| 2016 (est.) | 3,082 | ▼ | −0.4% |
U.S. Decennial Census

As of the census of 2000, there were 3,161 people, 1,115 households, and 855 families residing in the town. The population density was 17.6 inhabitants per square mile (6.8/km^{2}). There were 1,664 housing units at an average density of 9.3 per square mile (3.6/km^{2}). The racial makeup of the town was 99.24% White, 0.13% Black or African American, 0.06% Native American, 0.06% Asian, 0.22% from other races, and 0.28% from two or more races. Hispanic or Latino of any race were 0.47% of the population.

There were 1,115 households, out of which 37.9% had children under the age of 18 living with them, 64.0% were married couples living together, 7.3% had a female householder with no husband present, and 23.3% were non-families. 18.7% of all households were made up of individuals, and 9.7% had someone living alone who was 65 years of age or older. The average household size was 2.83 and the average family size was 3.25.

In the town, the population was spread out, with 28.7% under the age of 18, 8.4% from 18 to 24, 28.3% from 25 to 44, 22.9% from 45 to 64, and 11.7% who were 65 years of age or older. The median age was 36 years. For every 100 females, there were 102.0 males. For every 100 females age 18 and over, there were 100.5 males.

The median income for a household in the town was $34,722, and the median income for a family was $39,267. Males had a median income of $28,712 versus $19,423 for females. The per capita income for the town was $13,408. About 9.0% of families and 12.1% of the population were below the poverty line, including 13.9% of those under age 18 and 15.5% of those age 65 or over.

== Communities and locations in the town of Croghan ==
- Beaver Falls – A hamlet west of Croghan village.
- Beaver Falls Airport – An airport west of Beaver Falls. Was an emergency landing strip, but has not been used in years.
- Belfort – A hamlet northeast of Croghan village, colloquially known as "The City of the Future".
- Bishas Mill – A location on the eastern town line east of Jerden Falls. Both are now only cellar holes.
- Croghan – The Village of Croghan is at the southern town line on NY-812 and the Beaver River.
- Dutton Corners – A location in the northern part of the town, northwest of Jerden Falls.
- Forest City – A hamlet northwest of Croghan village.
- High Falls – A hamlet northeast of Croghan village.
- High Falls Pond – A small lake located next to the hamlet of High Falls.
- Indian River – A hamlet north of Croghan village on NY-812.
- Jerden Falls – A location in the northern part of the town. Once had a large tannery and associated hamlet.
- Karter Crossing – A location on the western town line near north Croghan Crossing.
- Long Pond – A lake located by Oswegatchie Camp.
- Naumburg – A hamlet at the junction of Routes NY-126 and NY-410 at the southwestern corner of the town near the confluence of the Black River and Beaver River.
- North Croghan – A hamlet in Jefferson County, west of North Croghan Crossing.
- North Croghan Crossing – A location at the western town line.
- Oswegatchie Camp – A hamlet on the eastern town line, located northeast of Soft Maple.
- Soft Maple – A hamlet near the eastern town line which consists of camps and a powerplant and a defunct gold mine.
- Soft Maple Dam Pond – A lake located by the southwestern corner of the town.
- Taylorville Reservoir – A reservoir located east of Belfort.
- Texas – A hamlet in the northwestern part of the town.
