= Sugar River (Black River tributary) =

Location
- Country: United States
- State: New York

Physical characteristics
- Source: North Branch Sugar River
- 2nd source: West Branch Sugar River
- Mouth: Black River
  - location: Boonville, New York
  - coordinates: 43°31′04″N 75°19′06″W
  - elevation: 911 ft (278 m)
- Basin size: 69.6 mi^{2} (180 km^{2})

Basin features
- Tributaries
  - right: Olmstead Brook, Stucky Creek, Moose Creek

Sugar River flows into the Black River near Boonville, New York.
