= Bardwell Mill, New York =

Bardwell Mill
- Hamlet
- Location in New York State Location within the United States
- Coordinates: 43°23′13″N 75°09′56″W
- Country: United States
- State: New York
- County: Oneida
- Town: Remsen
- Elevation: 1,178 ft (359 m)
- Time zone: UTC-5 (Eastern (EST))
  - Summer (DST): UTC-4 (EDT)
- ZIP code: 13438
- Area codes: 315

Bardwell Mill is a hamlet located-on Bardwell Mills Road in the Town of Remsen in Oneida County, New York. It is located south of Kayuta Lake.
