= Little Black Creek (Black River tributary) =

Location
- Country: United States
- State: New York

Physical characteristics
- Source: Black Creek Lake
  - coordinates: 43°27′10″N 74°54′01″W
  - elevation: 1,896 ft (578 m)
- Mouth: Black River
  - location: Bardwell Mill, New York
  - coordinates: 43°23′42″N 75°08′25″W
  - elevation: 1,158 ft (353 m)
- Basin size: 37.9 mi^{2} (98 km^{2})

Basin features
- Tributaries
  - right: Middle Branch Little Black Creek, North Branch Little Black Creek, Hars Brook, Muskrat Brook

Little Black Creek flows into the Black River near Bardwell Mill, New York, United States.
