= Welsh Calvinistic Methodist Church (Remsen, New York) =

Historic church in New York, United States

- U.S. National Register of Historic Places
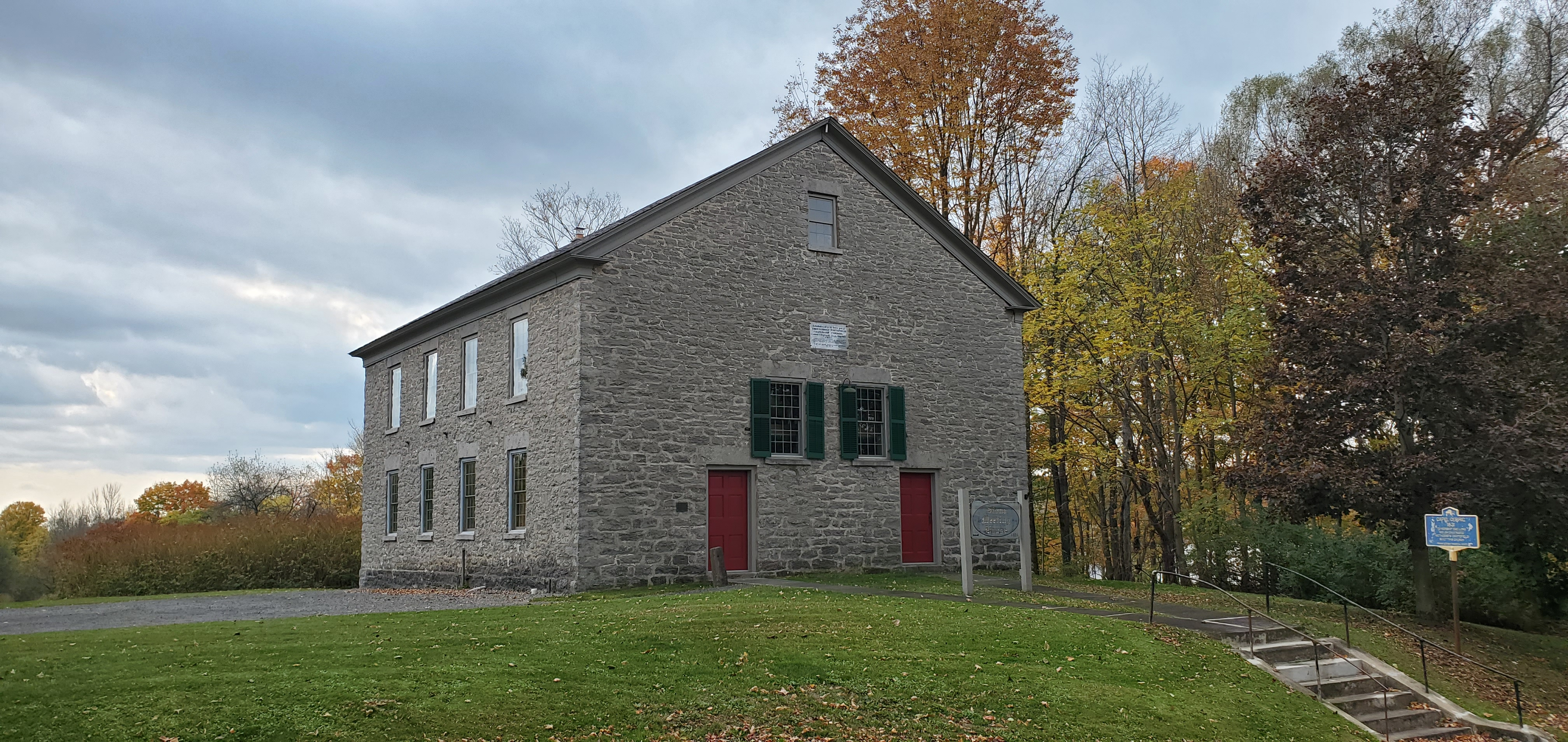
- Welsh Calvinistic Methodist Church, October 2020

- Location within New York Location within the United States
- Location: Prospect St., Remsen, New York
- Coordinates: 43°19′34″N 75°11′2″W
- Area: less than one acre
- Built: 1831
- Architectural style: Vernacular Federal
- NRHP reference No.: 87002275
- Added to NRHP: January 13, 1988

Welsh Calvinistic Methodist Church, also known as Capel Cerrig, is a historic Calvinistic Methodist church on Prospect Street in Remsen, Oneida County, New York. It was built in 1831 and is a vernacular stone meeting house building. It is a simple two story, rectangular building with a gable roof. It is known locally as the Stone Meeting House, and is home to the Remsen Steuben Historical Society.

It was listed on the National Register of Historic Places in 1988.
