= Miller Brook (Black River tributary) =

Location
- Country: United States
- State: New York

Physical characteristics
- Mouth: Black River
  - location: Port Leyden, New York
  - coordinates: 43°34′31″N 75°20′01″W
  - elevation: 862 ft (263 m)
- Basin size: 6.18 mi^{2} (16.0 km^{2})

Miller Brook flows into the Black River near Port Leyden, New York.
