= Douglas Creek (Canada) =

Stream in British Columbia, Canada

Douglas Creek PKOLS Creek
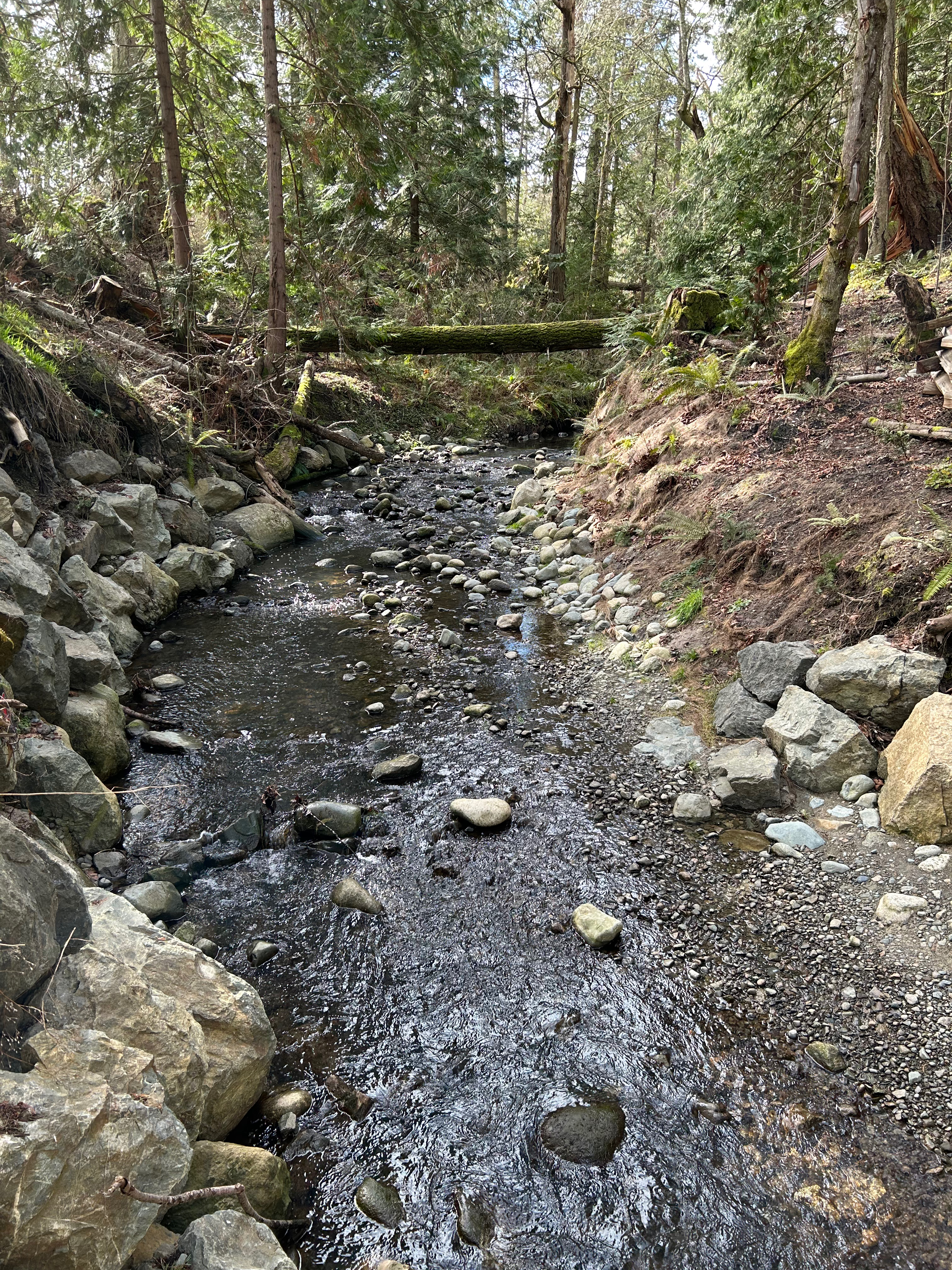
- Douglas Creek as seen from the pedestrian bridge in PKOLS (Mount Douglas Park)

- Map showing Douglas Creek

- Location of Douglas Creek on Vancouver Island
- Etymology: Named for James Douglas, the first Governor of British Columbia
- Nickname: Ash Creek (1928)

Location
- Country: Canada
- Province: British Columbia
- Municipality: Saanich
- Governing bodies: Fisheries and Oceans Canada, District of Saanich

Physical characteristics
- Source: Freshwater springs
  - location: Gordon Head
- 2nd source: Stormwater drainage system
- Mouth: Flows north into Cordova Bay, Haro Strait
  - location: PKOLS (Mount Douglas Park) Beach
  - coordinates: 48°29′48.0″N 123°19′57.8″W
  - elevation: Sea level
- Length: 0.8 kilometres (0.50 mi)

Basin features
- Progression: Douglas Creek → Cordova Bay

Douglas Creek is a small, 0.8 kilometres (0.50 mi) salmon-bearing urban stream that is located in the municipality of Saanich on Vancouver Island. It is located entirely within PKOLS (Mount Douglas Park) and its mouth empties into Haro Strait.

== History ==
Douglas Creek is located at the base of Mount Douglas (SENĆOŦEN: pq̕áls or PKOLS), which borders the traditional territories of the W̱SÁNEĆ and Lekwungen First Nations. For millennia, paddlers arriving from neighbouring Coast Salish Nations brought their canoes ashore at the beach where Douglas Creek empties into the Salish Sea. An archaeological shell midden at the mouth of Douglas Creek is recognized and protected by the British Columbia Heritage Conservation Act.

Historically, Douglas Creek consisted of approximately 7 kilometres (4.3 mi) of spring creek with several small tributaries that flowed through the land known today as Gordon Head. James Tod, the first European settler to register land in the watershed named his property "Spring Farm" on account of the plentiful freshwater springs in the area.

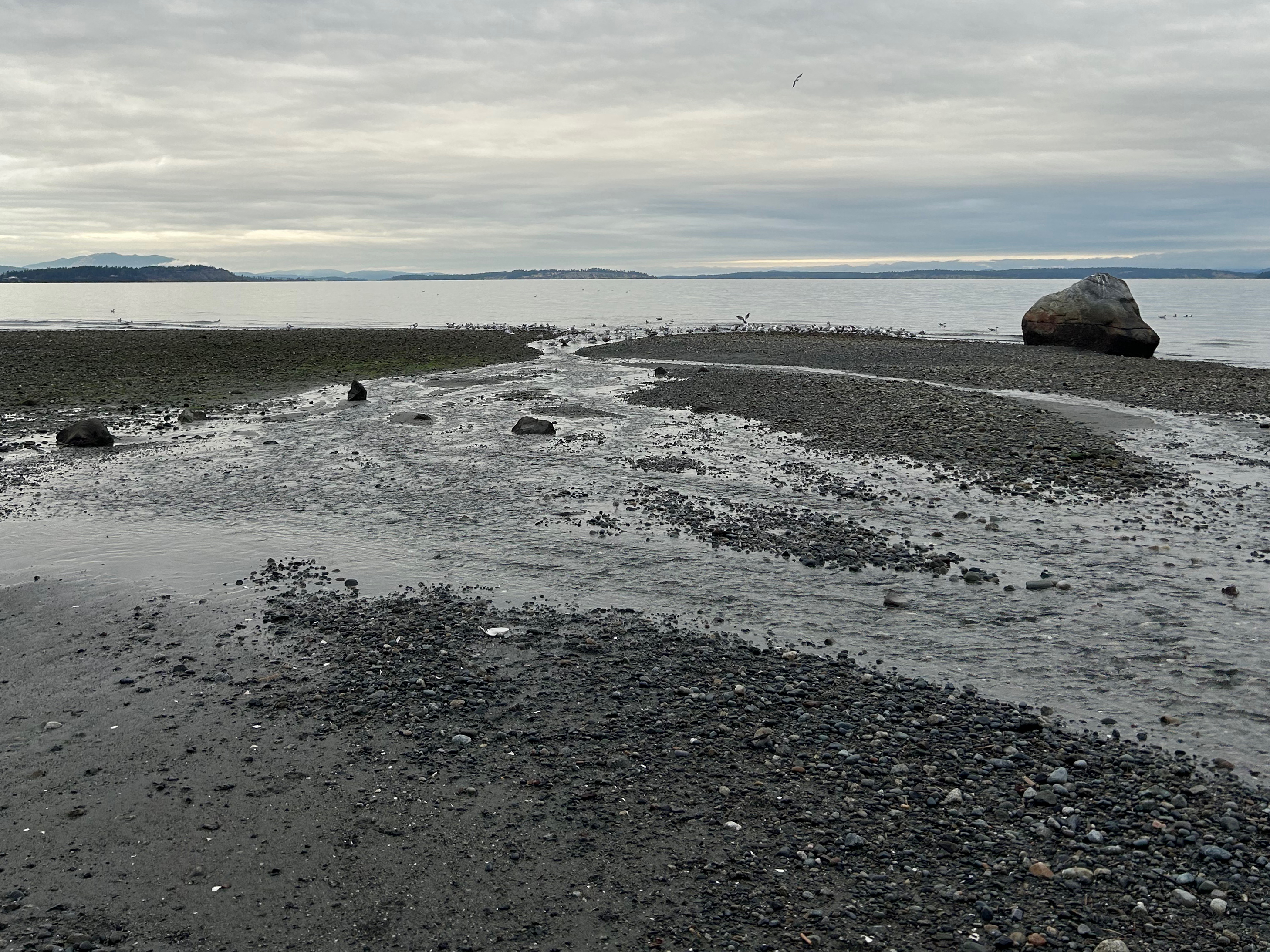
The tidal mouth of Douglas Creek as seen from PKOLS (Mount Douglas Park) beach at low tide.

== Description ==
=== Wildlife ===
Douglas Creek supports Chum salmon, Coho salmon, and Cutthroat trout. Salmon runs occurred annually until the mid-1960s, when the upper stream channels in the watershed were culverted and converted into a storm drain system.

The creek also supports benthic invertebrates, crayfish, and provides a year-round water source for many birds and mammals, including mallards, Columbian black-tailed deer, raccoons, and North American river otter.

=== Tributaries ===
In the present day, the creek is drained by three tributaries, all of which are located within the boundaries of PKOLS (Mount Douglas Park).

== Ecological restoration ==
As land use in the watershed shifted from agricultural to residential development, the open channels of Douglas Creek were culverted, leaving less than 1km of open stream. The increase of impervious surfaces and drainage infrastructure in the watershed led to extremely high peak water flows in the creek, resulting in ongoing bank erosion and deterioration of habitat. Chemical runoff and pollution were also contributing to poor water quality, with several oil and chemical spill incidents reported.

Beginning in 1995, habitat restoration efforts involving multiple levels of government organizations, community members, non-profits, and school groups were successful in improving habitat quality, and salmon fry were regularly released into the creek.

Although adult chum did return over subsequent years, the counts were minimal despite further fry releases, and issues with water and habitat quality persisted. A weir structure and sediment pond at the creek outlet was installed in 2001 to assist in filtering pollutants.

In subsequent years, ongoing habitat restoration and reintroduction of Chum and Coho salmon eggs, fry, and smolts have resulted in the successful return of spawning salmon every year since restoration work began. Salmon carcasses are transplanted into the creek bed each year in order to simulate the ecological process of nutrient cycling associated with natural salmon returns.

== Watershed ==
Douglas Creek drains 5.584 square kilometres (558.4 ha) including the land serviced by approximately 70-80 kilometres of storm drains. Historically, this region consisted of a mix of Douglas fir forests and Garry oak woodlands and meadows. The Douglas Creek watershed is located within the rain shadow of the Olympic Mountains and receives approximately 686.1 millimetres (27.01 in) of rainfall each year. A 2011 mapping analysis identifies the watershed as consisting of approximately 39.5% impervious surfaces, 33.2% tree cover, 27% vegetation, bare ground, or exposed bedrock, and 0.2% riparian area or seasonal wetland.

== See also ==
- List of rivers in Canada
- Salmon migration
- Tidal creek
- Daylighting (streams)
- Stormwater
