= Kelsey Creek (Black River tributary) =

Location
- Country: United States
- State: New York
- County: Jefferson

Physical characteristics
- Mouth: Black River
  - location: Watertown, New York
  - coordinates: 43°59′21″N 75°55′32″W
  - elevation: 371 ft (113 m)
- Basin size: 8.3 mi^{2} (21 km^{2})

Kelsey Creek flows into the Black River near Watertown, New York.
