= Harvey Creek (Wisconsin River tributary) =

Stream in Wisconsin, U.S.

Coordinates: 44°19′53″N 89°52′11″W

Harvey Creek is a stream in the U.S. state of Wisconsin. It is a tributary to the Wisconsin River.

Harvey Creek is named after R. Harvey, a local landowner.
