= Douglas Creek (Washington) =

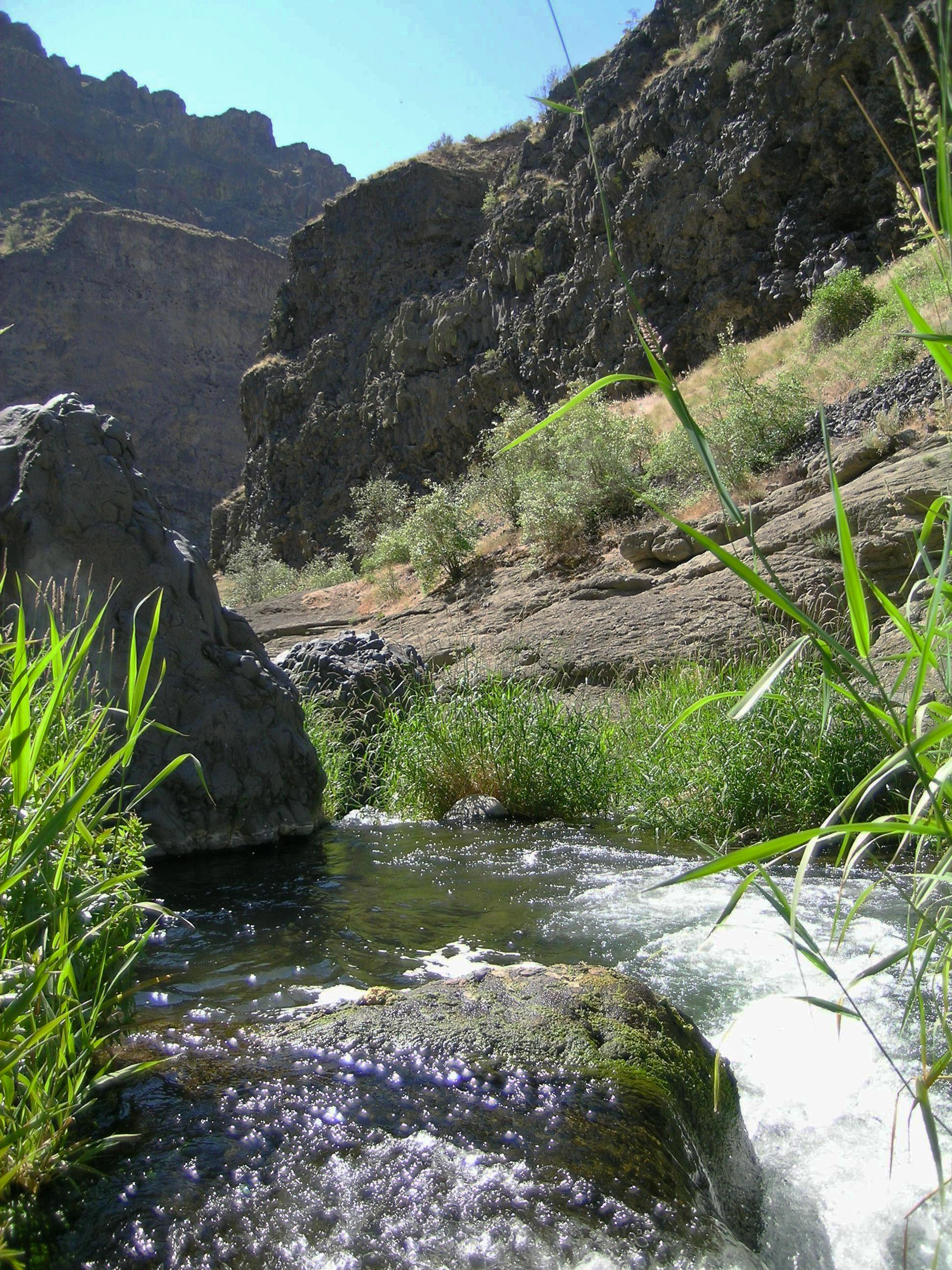

Physical characteristics
- Source
  - location: Waterville Plateau, Douglas County
  - coordinates: 47°44′09″N 119°59′49″W
- Mouth
  - location: Columbia River at Wanapum Lake in Douglas County
  - coordinates: 47°16′11″N 120°05′14″W
- Basin size: 132,056 acres (53,441 ha)
- Discharge
  - average: 12 to 25 cubic feet per second (0.34 to 0.71 m^{3}/s)

Basin features
- Progression: Columbia River → Pacific Ocean

Douglas Creek is a creek in Douglas County, Washington. It rises in Douglas County, flows through Moses Coulee then empties to Wanapum Lake on the Columbia River. The course of the creek through Moses Coulee displays an "outdoor geologic laboratory" exhibiting basalt formations and relics of the Missoula floods of the last ice age. The watershed of Douglas Creek proper covers 132,056 acres (53,441 ha), about 11% of the county, but including McCarteny Creek the entire Moses Coulee drainage is 1,000 square miles (2,600 km^{2}) or a little more than half of the county. The creek's flow reaches the Columbia River "during storm water runoff events", otherwise being absorbed into the aquifer.
