= Cold Brook (Black River tributary) =

- Location of mouth within New York Cold Brook (Black River tributary) (the United States)

Location
- Country: United States
- State: New York

Physical characteristics
- Source
  - coordinates: 43°35′10″N 75°16′15″W
- Mouth: Black River
  - location: Port Leyden
  - coordinates: 43°35′09″N 75°20′21″W
  - elevation: 853 ft (260 m)

Cold Brook is a stream in Lewis County, New York, United States, that flows into the Black River near Port Leyden, New York. It has a drainage area of 4.80 square miles, and is designated by the United States Geological Survey as "Hydrologic Unit 04150101".
