= Soft Maple Reservoir =

- Location within New York Soft Maple Reservoir (the United States)
- Location: Lewis County, New York, United States
- Coordinates: 43°54′50″N 75°13′10″W
- Type: Reservoir
- Primary inflows: Beaver River, Fish Creek
- Primary outflows: Beaver River
- Basin countries: United States
- Surface area: 338 acres (1.37 km^{2})
- Average depth: 22 feet (6.7 m)
- Max. depth: 63 feet (19 m)
- Shore length^{1}: 6.1 miles (9.8 km)
- Surface elevation: 1,289 feet (393 m)
- Islands: 9
- Settlements: Eagle Falls, New York
- ^{1} Shore length is not a well-defined measure.

Soft Maple Reservoir is a reservoir located by Eagle Falls, New York. Fish species present in the lake are tiger muskie, white sucker, pickerel, smallmouth bass, rock bass, yellow perch, and black bullhead. There is a carry down on Soft Maple Road, on the southwest shore.

== Locations and tributaries ==
- Engle Pond – A bay of Soft Maple Reservoir, located north of the dam.
- Soft Maple Dam Pond – An 89-acre lake located west of the reservoir. It is the secondary outflow of the Soft Maple Reservoir. There is access to the pond via a small channel from Soft Maple Reservoir.
