= Doe Pond (Limekiln Lake, New York) =

Lake in Herkimer County, New York, United States

- Location of Doe Pond within New York
- Location: Herkimer County, New York
- Coordinates: 43°41′13″N 74°50′16″W
- Surface area: 7 acres (0.011 mi^{2}; 2.8 ha)
- Surface elevation: 1,824 feet (556 m)
- Settlements: Old Forge

Doe Pond is a small lake east-southeast of Old Forge in Herkimer County, New York. It drains west via an unnamed creek that flows into Johns Lake.

== See also ==
- List of lakes in New York
