= Hawkinsville, New York =

- Hamlet
- Location within New York Location within the United States
- Coordinates: 43°29′37″N 75°16′38″W
- Country: United States
- State: New York
- County: Oneida
- Town: Boonville
- Elevation: 1,073 ft (327 m)
- Time zone: UTC-5 (Eastern (EST))
  - Summer (DST): UTC-4 (EDT)
- ZIP code: 13309
- Area code: 315

Hawkinsville is a hamlet located east of Boonville, New York on Hawkinsville Road in Oneida County, New York. The Black River flows north through the hamlet.
