= Kayuta Lake =

- Location within New York Kayuta Lake (the United States)
- Location: Oneida County, New York, United States
- Coordinates: 43°24′38″N 75°11′58″W
- Type: Reservoir
- Primary inflows: Black River, Gulf Creek, Pine Creek, Baker Brook, Indian Creek
- Primary outflows: Black River
- Basin countries: United States
- Surface area: 474 acres (1.92 km^{2})
- Average depth: 10 feet (3.0 m)
- Max. depth: 22 feet (6.7 m)
- Shore length^{1}: 13.1 miles (21.1 km)
- Surface elevation: 1,142 feet (348 m)
- Islands: 5
- Settlements: Bardwell Mill, New York, Forestport, New York
- ^{1} Shore length is not a well-defined measure.

Kayuta Lake is located northwest of Bardwell Mill, New York. Kayuta Lake Campground is located by the Black River inlet. Fish species present in the lake are smallmouth bass, pickerel, white sucker, rock bass, yellow perch, bluegill, and black bullhead. There is a carry down access on the north shore located on State Dam Road.
