= Wheelertown, New York =

- Hamlet
- Location within New York Location within the United States
- Coordinates: 43°23′43″N 75°03′48″W
- Country: United States
- State: New York
- County: Herkimer
- Town: Russia
- Elevation: 1,385 ft (422 m)
- Time zone: UTC-5 (Eastern (EST))
  - Summer (DST): UTC-4 (EDT)
- ZIP code: 13324
- Area code: 315

Wheelertown is a hamlet located on Wheelertown Road in the town of Russia in Herkimer County, New York, United States. Little Black Creek flows east through the hamlet.
