= Watson, New York =

- Town
- Location within New York Location within the United States
- Coordinates: 43°48′16″N 75°17′30″W
- Country: United States
- State: New York
- County: Lewis

Area
  - Total: 115.70 sq mi (299.65 km^{2})
  - Land: 112.74 sq mi (291.99 km^{2})
  - Water: 2.96 sq mi (7.67 km^{2})
- Elevation: 1,280 ft (390 m)

Population (2010)
  - Total: 1,881
  - Estimate (2016): 1,849
  - Density: 16.4/sq mi (6.33/km^{2})
- Time zone: UTC-5 (Eastern (EST))
  - Summer (DST): UTC-4 (EDT)
- ZIP Codes: 13367 (Lowville); 13343 (Glenfield)
- Area code: 315
- FIPS code: 36-049-78729
- GNIS feature ID: 979607
- Website: townofwatsonny.com

Watson is a town in Lewis County, New York, United States. The population was 1,802 at the 2020 census. The town is named after early landowner James Watson. The town is at the eastern border of the county and is east of Lowville, the county seat.

== History ==
The area of Watson was first settled circa 1815. The town was formed from the town of Leyden in 1821. Parts of Watson were later taken to form the towns of Greig (1828), Diana (1830), Croghan (1841), and New Bremen (1848).

== Geography ==
According to the United States Census Bureau, the town has a total area of 115.7 square miles (300 km^{2}), of which 112.7 square miles (292 km^{2}) are land and 3.0 square miles (7.8 km^{2}), or 2.56%, are water.

The eastern town line is the border of Herkimer County, and the western town line is partly defined by the Black River.

The Beaver River, a tributary of the Black River, flows through the northern part of the town. The eastern section of Watson is inside the Adirondack Park.

== Demographics ==
Historical population
Census	Pop.	Note	%±
1830	909		—
1840	1,707		87.8%
1850	1,138		−33.3%
1860	1,028		−9.7%
1870	1,146		11.5%
1880	1,470		28.3%
1890	1,299		−11.6%
1900	981		−24.5%
1910	757		−22.8%
1920	707		−6.6%
1930	528		−25.3%
1940	536		1.5%
1950	586		9.3%
1960	781		33.3%
1970	1,072		37.3%
1980	1,272		18.7%
1990	1,613		26.8%
2000	1,986		23.1%
2010	1,881		−5.3%
2016 (est.)	1,849		−1.7%
U.S. Decennial Census

As of the census of 2020, there were 1,802 people, 774 households, and 500 families residing in the town. The population density was 15.6 inhabitants per square mile (6.0/km^{2}). There were 1,296 housing units at an average density of 11.2 per square mile (4.3/km^{2}). The racial makeup of the town was 94.89% White, 0.17% African American, 0.05% Native American, 0.17% Asian, 0.00% Pacific Islander, and 4.67% from two or more races. Hispanic or Latino of any race were 0.94% of the population.

There were 774 households, out of which 153 had children under the age of 18 living with them, 438 were married couples living together, 129 had a female householder with no husband present, and 274 were non-families. 69 of all households were made up of individuals, and 47 had someone living alone who was 65 years of age or older. The average family size was 2.68.

In the town, the population was spread out, with 19% under the age of 18, 7.6% from 18 to 24, 20.72% from 25 to 44, 32.24% from 45 to 64, and 20.5% who were 65 years of age or older. The median age was 47.2 years.

The median income for a household in the town was $68,364, and the median income for a family was $70,203. 9.2% of the population were below the poverty line.

== Communities and locations in Watson ==
- Beaver Lake – A lake in the northeastern part of the town by the town line.
- Bushes Landing – A hamlet east of Watson Village on County Road 26 and near the Black River.
- Chase Lake – A lake south of Sperryville.
- Crystal Dale – A location near the northern town line, located north of Petries Corners on County Road 26.
- Eagle Falls – A location on the Beaver River in the northern part of the town.
- Francis Lake – A lake near the eastern town line, south of Beaver Lake.
- Moshier Falls – A location at the eastern town line in Herkimer County.
- Number Four – A location in the northeastern part of the town, west of Beaver Lake on County Road 26.
- Petries Corners – A hamlet in the southern section of the town, northeast of Watson village on County Road 26.
- Pine Grove – A hamlet near the southern town line, southeast of Watson village. The Pine Grove Community Church was listed on the National Register of Historic Places in 2009.
- Soft Maple Reservoir – An artificial lake at the town line by Eagle Falls.
- Sperryville – A hamlet in the southern part of the town, inside the Adirondack Park.
- Stony Lake – A lake east of Sperryville.
- Watson – The hamlet of Watson is on County Road 26 in the southwestern part of the town by the Black River.
