= North Wilmurt, New York =

- Hamlet
- Location within New York Location within the United States
- Coordinates: 43°26′59″N 75°01′00″W
- Country: United States
- State: New York
- County: Herkimer
- Town: Ohio
- Elevation: 1,621 ft (494 m)
- Time zone: UTC-5 (Eastern (EST))
  - Summer (DST): UTC-4 (EDT)
- ZIP code: 13324
- Area code: 315

North Wilmurt is a hamlet located on Farr Road in the town of Ohio in Herkimer County, New York, United States. Twin Lakes Stream flows west through the hamlet.
