= Glenfield, New York =

- Hamlet
- Location within New York Location within the United States
- Coordinates: 43°42′37″N 75°24′08″W
- Country: United States
- State: New York
- County: Lewis
- Town: Martinsburg
- Elevation: 768 ft (234 m)
- Time zone: UTC-5 (Eastern (EST))
  - Summer (DST): UTC-4 (EDT)
- ZIP code: 13343
- Area codes: 315 & 680
- GNIS feature ID: 951212

Glenfield is a hamlet in the town of Martinsburg, Lewis County, New York, United States. The community is located in the southeast corner of Martinsburg, along the Black River and New York State Route 12, 7 miles (11 km) southeast of Lowville. Glenfield has a post office with ZIP code 13343, which opened on March 3, 1855.
