= Black River (New York) =

River in New York state, United States

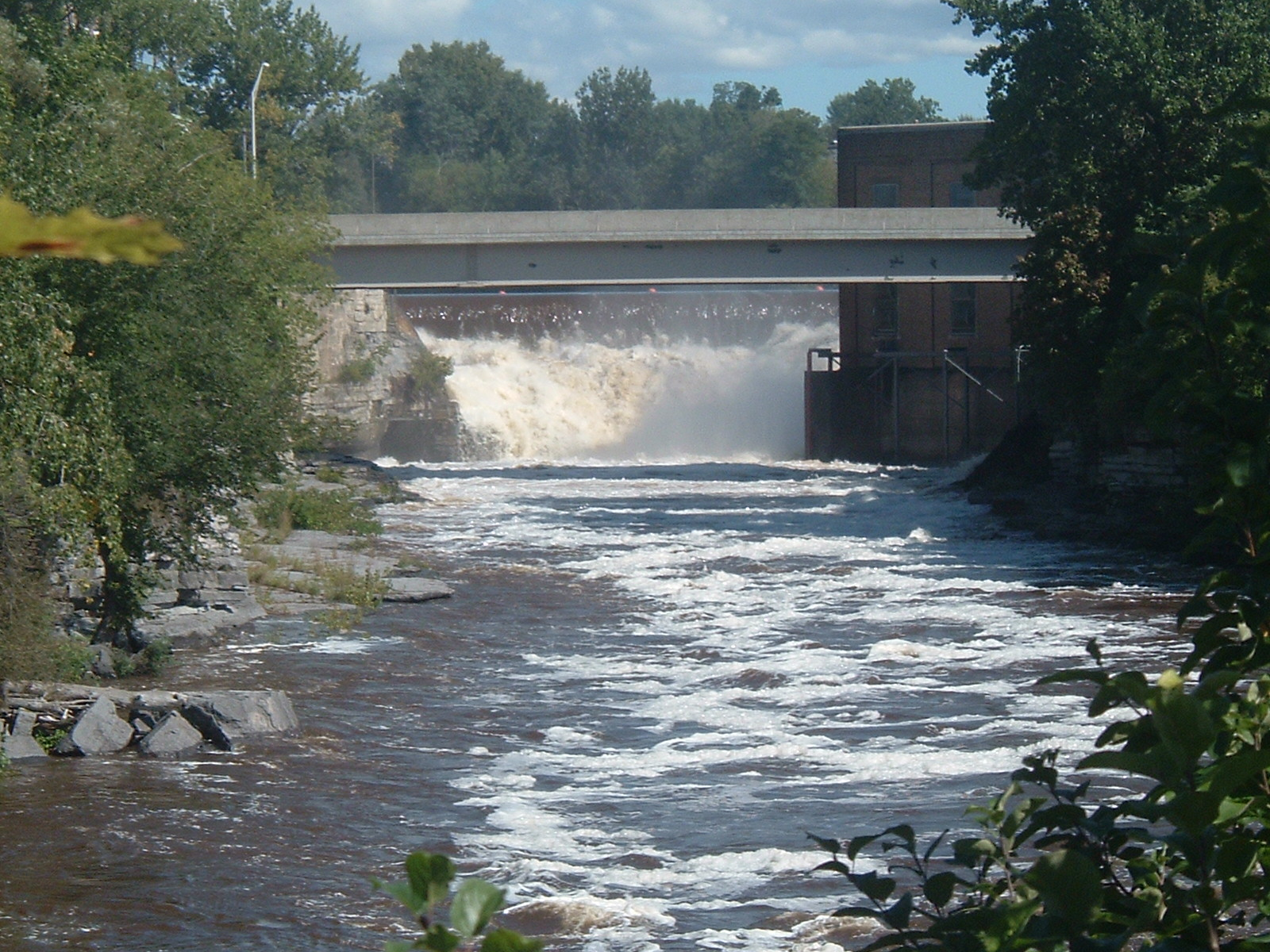
- The Black River's Great Falls, Watertown, New York

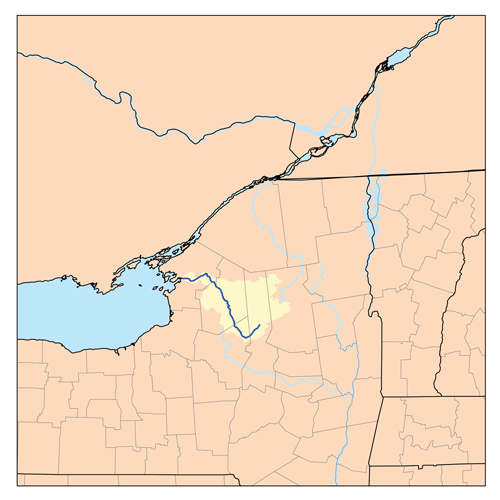
- A map of the Black River watershed

Location
- Country: United States
- State: New York

Physical characteristics
- Source: North Lake
  - location: Herkimer County, New York, Adirondack Mountains
  - coordinates: 43°31′19″N 74°56′53″W
  - elevation: 1,850 ft (560 m)
- Mouth: Lake Ontario
  - location: Dexter, Jefferson County
  - coordinates: 43°59′39″N 76°03′54″W
  - elevation: 246 ft (75 m)
- Length: 125 mi (201 km)
- Basin size: 1,920 sq mi (5,000 km^{2})
- Discharge
  - location: Watertown
  - average: 4,242 cu ft/s (120.1 m^{3}/s)
  - minimum: 137 cu ft/s (3.9 m^{3}/s)
  - maximum: 52,000 cu ft/s (1,500 m^{3}/s)

Basin features
- Progression: Lake Ontario→ Saint Lawrence River→ Gulf of Saint Lawrence
- River system: Lake Ontario drainage basin
- Tributaries
  - left: South Branch Black River, Deer River
  - right: Moose River; Otter Creek, Independence River, Beaver River

The Black River is a 125-mile-long (201 km) blackwater river that empties into the eastern end of Lake Ontario on the shore of Jefferson County, New York in the United States. The origin of the name is not clear, but it may stem from the natural tannic acid that darkens the water in places. The river flows in a generally northwest direction, with its valley dividing the Adirondack Mountains on the east from the Tug Hill region to the west.

== Course ==
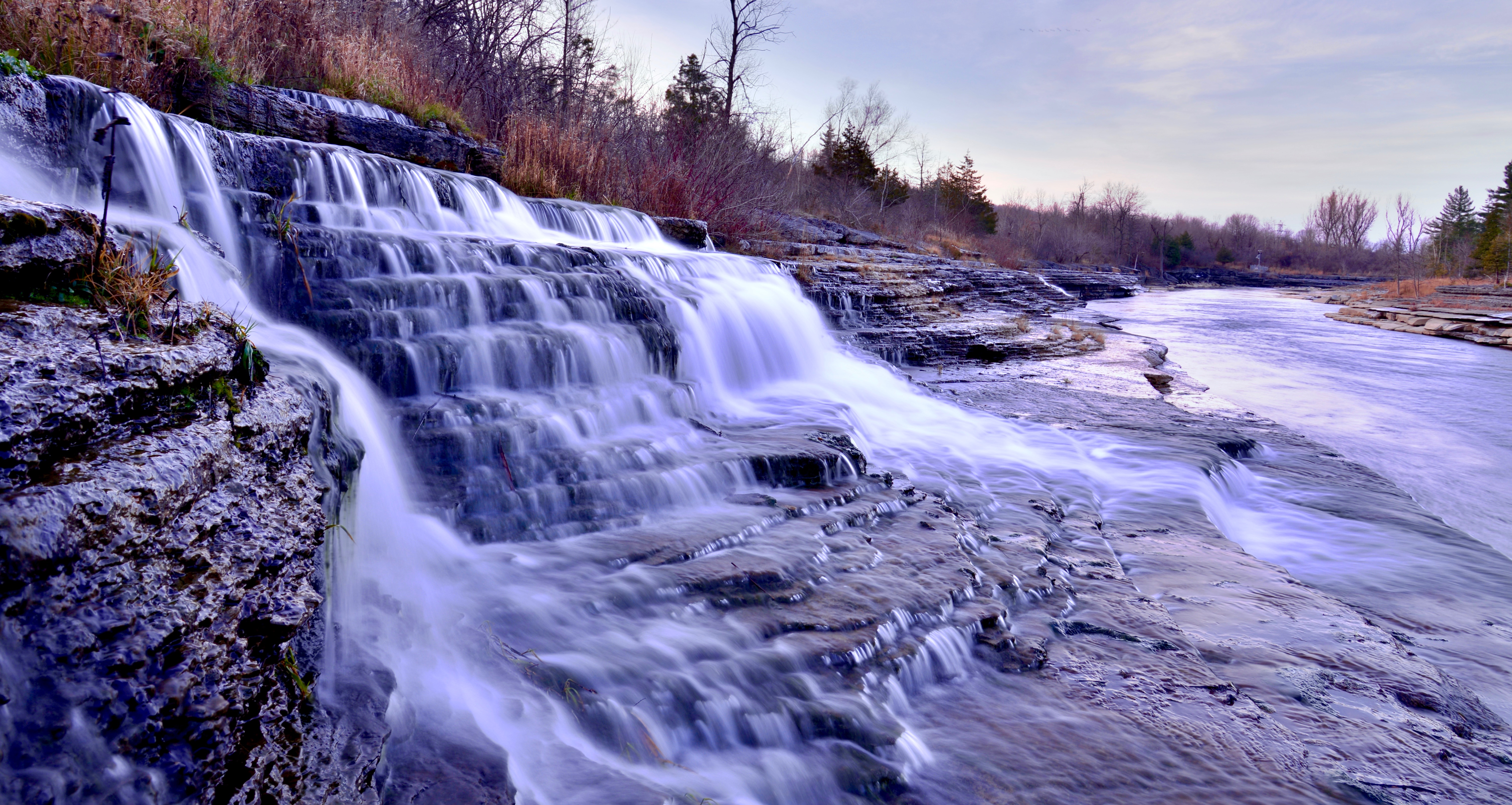
The cascade of a small tributary entering the Black River just south of NY Route 3, in the Village of Black River

The Black River originates at North Lake in the foothills of the Adirondacks, in Herkimer County, about 25 miles (40 km) east of Boonville. The river flows west into Oneida County then north, past Forestport and Boonville into Lewis County. At Lyons Falls, it is joined by the Moose River from the east just above the eponymous waterfall, where the river drops 70 feet (21 m) over a gneiss cliff.

Near Glenfield the Black River receives the smaller tributaries of Otter Creek and the Independence River, also from the east. Further north, it passes Lowville, then receives the Beaver River from the east, then the Deer River, its only major western tributary. Starting above Carthage the river briefly divides Lewis and Jefferson Counties before crossing entirely into Jefferson County, where it turns sharply west toward Lake Ontario, flowing past Great Bend, Black River and Watertown. Below Watertown it enters a canyon, well known for its challenging rapids.

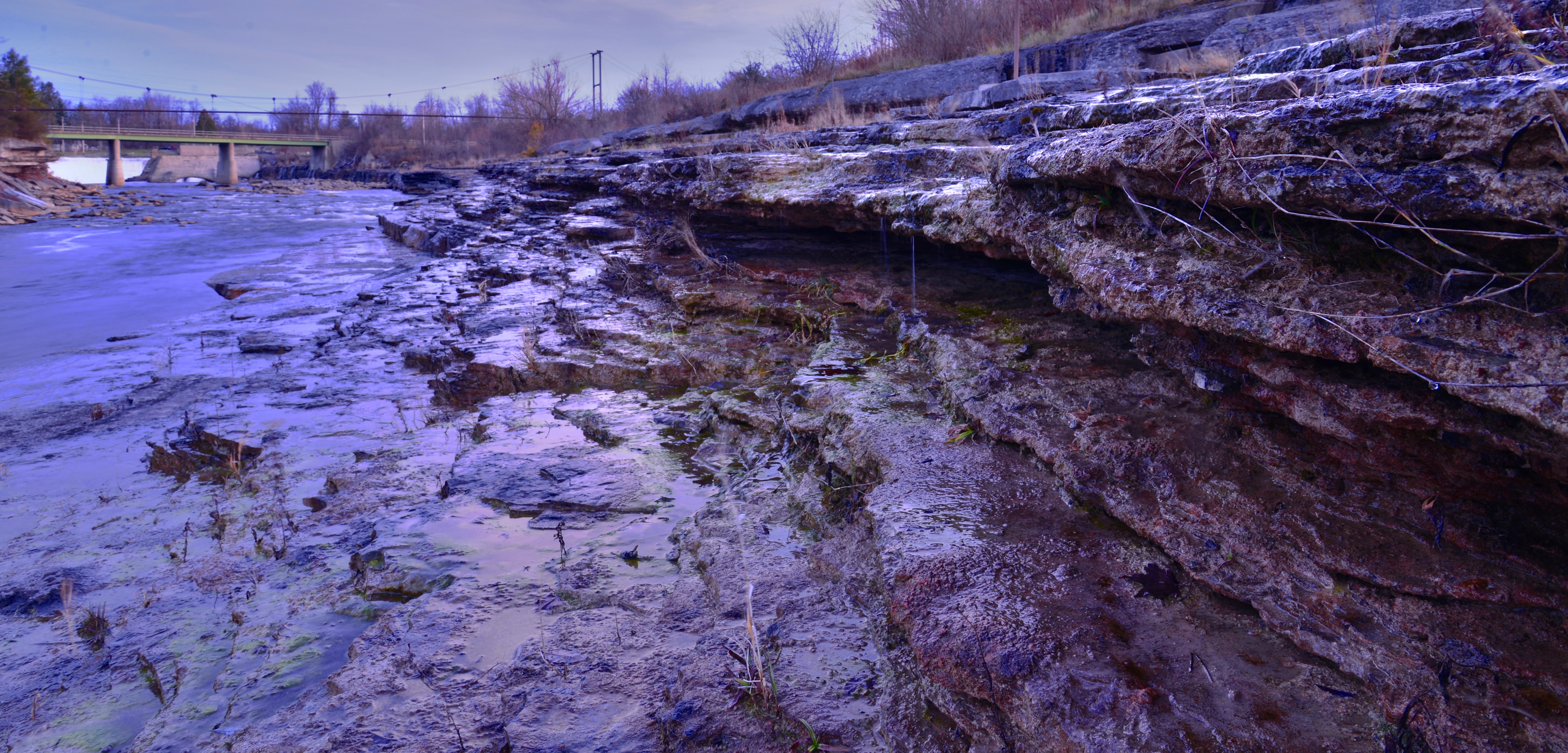
Looking north at the bridge over NY Route 3

The river ends at Lake Ontario in the village of Dexter, about 10 miles (16 km) west of Watertown, where it empties into the Black River Bay and Marsh, which are parts of the Golden Crescent. For the last few miles it forms the boundary between the Towns of Brownville and Hounsfield.

== Dams ==
There are at least 17 dams on the Black River, with eight in the upper part above Lyons Falls, and nine below Watertown. The upper and lower reaches of the river have a steep gradient and were originally developed to provide mechanical power for mills, such as the old Georgia-Pacific paper mill (which now sits abandoned and falling into disrepair) in Lyons Falls, and later hydroelectricity. In contrast the middle 40 miles (64 km) of the river have practically no gradient and are not suitable to the development of head for industrial or hydropower projects.

The three uppermost dams, forming North Lake, Kayuta Lake and the smaller Forestport Reservoir are the only structures forming significant impoundments. The other dams are run-of-the-river, with no appreciable storage capacity, so power generation is entirely dependent on the natural flow of the river combined with releases from upstream reservoirs, which is relatively consistent except for drought years.

== Sporting activities ==
Abundant trout, salmon, bass, and pike are present in the stream, and salmon is the most favored.

Whitewater rafting and kayaking are popular on some stretches of the river, notably the Black River Canyon, which begins in Watertown and ends in Brownville. The Black River Canyon is one of few whitewater streams which have reliable flows throughout the summer. The "Canyon" itself is not actually present until you reach Brownville and ends in the Dexter Reservoir.

== Environmental issues ==
A number of streams and lakes in the watershed have been impaired as a result of acid rain. Elevated levels of mercury have led to restrictions on the consumption of fish in some areas.

In August 2005, the Black River was contaminated by a spill from a manure lagoon on Marks Dairy Farm (a concentrated animal feeding operation near Lowville) when a retaining wall gave way, allowing the contents of a waste holding pond to spill. About 3 million US gallons (11,000 m^{3}) of pollution flowed into the river. An estimated 280,000 to 375,000 fish were killed. As of August 3, 2006, a settlement has been reached and Marks Dairy Farm, originator of the spill, was ordered to pay $2.2 million.

== Tributaries ==
Left
South Branch Black River
Twin Lakes Stream
Little Black Creek
Kent Creek
Mill Creek
Sugar River
Mill Creek
Douglass Creek
House Falls Creek
Whetstone Creek
Roaring Brook
Rainbow Creek
Mill Creek
Negro Creek
Stony Creek
Deer River
Felts Mills Creek

Right
Otter Brook
Indian Creek
Cold Brook
Cummings Creek
Mile Creek
Fall Brook
Miller Brook
Cold Brook
Moose River
Fish Creek
Otter Creek
Independence River
Harvey Creek
Hodge Creek
Crystal Creek
Capidon Creek
Beaver River
Potash Creek
Swiss Creek
Kelsey Creek
Philomel Creek
Trout Creek

== See also ==
- List of New York rivers
- Village of Black River, New York
