= Carthage Senior High School (Carthage, New York) =

Coordinates: 43°59′13″N 75°38′41″W

Carthage Central High School

Location
- 36500 NYS Route 26; Carthage, New York 13619; United States

Information
- Type: Public
- Established: 1945
- School district: Carthage Central School District
- Principal: Emily Remington
- Teaching staff: 75.20 (FTE)
- Grades: 9 - 12
- Enrollment: 887 (2024–2025)
- Student to teacher ratio: 11.80
- Colors: Scarlet Red and Grey
- Mascot: Comet
- Yearbook: Carthadian
- Feeder schools: Black River, Carthage, and West Carthage elementary schools, Carthage Middle School
- Tuition: None
- Website: https://hs.carthagecsd.org

Carthage Central High School is located on a 123 acres (50 ha) site in a rural geographic area of northern New York State, 40 mi (64 km) from the Canada–United States border, 6 mi (9.7 km) south of Fort Drum, 15 mi (24 km) east of Watertown, and 90 mi (140 km) northeast of Syracuse. The high school serves the villages of Carthage, West Carthage, Black River, Great Bend, Felt Mills, Deferiet, Deer River, Herrings, and Natural Bridge along with a portion of the housing at the Fort Drum Army base. The population within this area is approximately 22,000. The high school is on Route 26, 1.5 mi (2.4 km) east from the intersection of Route 26 and Route 126 in West Carthage and serves an area of about 260 sq mi (670 km^{2}). It maintains a population of about 950 for grades 9–12.

== Alumni ==
- Khalid, Top charting singer-songwriter (did not graduate)
- Casey Powell, professional lacrosse player
- Ryan Powell, professional lacrosse player
- Mikey Powell, professional lacrosse player
- Dave Trembley, Major League Baseball manager and executive
- Edward J. Westcott, Adjutant General of New York
