= Augusta Larned =

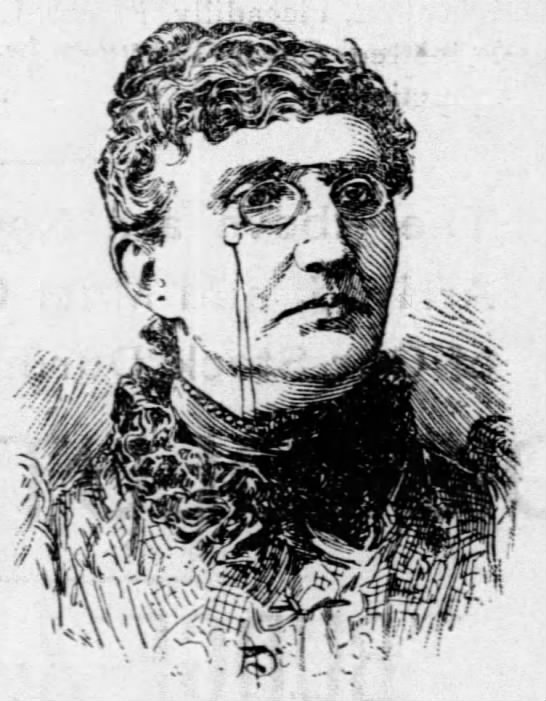
- Born: April 16, 1835; Rutland
- Died: January 8, 1924 (aged 88)

Augusta Larned (April 16, 1835 – January 8, 1924) was an American author, editor, and suffragist.

Augusta Larned was born on April 16, 1835 in Rutland, New York, the daughter of Zebedee and Sarah A. Etheridge Larned. She began her literary career in 1867, writing for The Independent. In 1870, she edited the women's rights journal The Revolution. For 20 years, she wrote for The Christian Register.

Larned lived for many years in Summit, New Jersey. She wrote a book, The Borderland of Country Life (1919), describing the changes the automobile made to Summit, called "Heaven's Hill" in her work.

Augusta Larned died on 8 January 1924.

== Bibliography ==
- Home Stories (1872-78), six volumes
- Talks with Girls (1873)
- Old Tales Retold from Grecian Mythology (1875)
- The Norse Grandmother, Tales from the Eddas (1880)
- Village Photographs (1887)
- In Woods and Fields (1895)
- The Borderland of Country Life (1919)
