= New York State Route 3F =

New York State Route 3F may refer to:

- New York State Route 3F (1931–1932) in Jefferson County
- New York State Route 3F (1932–1935) in Wayne, Cayuga, and Oswego Counties
