= Herrings, New York =

- Village
- Location within New York Location within the United States
- Coordinates: 44°1′26″N 75°39′35″W
- Country: United States
- State: New York
- County: Jefferson
- Town: Wilna
- Incorporated: 1921
- Dissolved: March 31, 2017

Area
  - Total: 0.19 sq mi (0.50 km^{2})
  - Land: 0.15 sq mi (0.40 km^{2})
  - Water: 0.039 sq mi (0.10 km^{2})
- Elevation: 690 ft (210 m)

Population (2020)
  - Total: 116
  - Density: 753.3/sq mi (290.84/km^{2})
- Time zone: UTC-5 (Eastern (EST))
  - Summer (DST): UTC-4 (EDT)
- ZIP Code: 13619 (Carthage)
- Area code: 315
- FIPS code: 36-34220
- GNIS feature ID: 0952642

Herrings is a hamlet and former village in Jefferson County, New York, United States. The population was 90 at the 2010 census, down from 129 in 2000. The hamlet is named after two brothers who owned a paper mill in the area.

Herrings is at the western edge of the town of Wilna and is east of Watertown.

== History ==
The community was an important stagecoach stop.

Herrings was incorporated as a village in 1921, but dissolved that status in 2017.

== Geography ==
Herrings is located in eastern Jefferson County at 44°1′26″N 75°39′35″W (44.023868, -75.659709), on the southwestern edge of the town of Wilna. The community lies on the north bank of the Black River, which forms the boundary between Wilna and the town of Champion.

According to the United States Census Bureau, the CDP has a total area of 0.33 square miles (0.86 km^{2}), of which 0.28 square miles (0.73 km^{2}) are land and 0.05 square miles (0.13 km^{2}), or 14.79%, are water.

New York State Route 3 passes through the community, leading west 14 miles (23 km) to Watertown, the county seat, and southeast 4 miles (6 km) to Carthage.

== Demographics ==
Historical population
Census	Pop.	Note	%±
1930	274		—
1940	232		−15.3%
1950	192		−17.2%
1960	171		−10.9%
1970	137		−19.9%
1980	170		24.1%
1990	140		−17.6%
2000	129		−7.9%
2010	90		−30.2%
2020	116		28.9%
U.S. Decennial Census

As of the census of 2000, there were 129 people, 42 households, and 30 families residing in what was then a village. The population density was 446.7 inhabitants per square mile (172.5/km^{2}). There were 44 housing units at an average density of 152.3 per square mile (58.8/km^{2}). The racial makeup of the village was 86.82% White, 4.65% African American, 4.65% Native American, 0.78% Asian, 1.55% from other races, and 1.55% from two or more races. Hispanic or Latino of any race were 2.33% of the population.

There were 42 households, out of which 45.2% had children under the age of 18 living with them, 59.5% were married couples living together, 7.1% had a female householder with no husband present, and 26.2% were non-families. 16.7% of all households were made up of individuals, and 2.4% had someone living alone who was 65 years of age or older. The average household size was 3.02 and the average family size was 3.29.

In the village, the population was spread out, with 34.1% under the age of 18, 7.0% from 18 to 24, 30.2% from 25 to 44, 24.0% from 45 to 64, and 4.7% who were 65 years of age or older. The median age was 32 years. For every 100 females, there were 101.6 males. For every 100 females age 18 and over, there were 102.4 males.

The median income for a household in the village was $33,750, and the median income for a family was $33,750. Males had a median income of $24,583 versus $23,750 for females. The per capita income for the village was $9,674. There were 13.5% of families and 18.8% of the population living below the poverty line, including 21.3% of under eighteens and 22.2% of those over 64.
