= Carthage Senior High School =

There is more than one Carthage Senior High School:

- Carthage Senior High School (Carthage, Missouri)
- Carthage Senior High School (Carthage, New York)
- Carthage High School (Carthage, Texas)
- Carthage High School (Carthage, Illinois) - now deactivated and a component of the consolidated Illini West High School
