= Diana, New York =

- Town
- Location in New York Location in the United States
- Coordinates: 44°6′4″N 75°21′9″W
- Country: United States
- State: New York
- County: Lewis

Area
  - Total: 140.83 sq mi (364.75 km^{2})
  - Land: 137.10 sq mi (355.08 km^{2})
  - Water: 3.73 sq mi (9.67 km^{2})
- Elevation: 873 ft (266 m)

Population (2010)
  - Total: 1,709
  - Estimate (2016): 1,704
  - Density: 12/sq mi (4.8/km^{2})
- Time zone: UTC-5 (Eastern (EST))
  - Summer (DST): UTC-4 (EDT)
- ZIP Codes: 13648 (Harrisville); 13665 (Natural Bridge)
- Area code: 315
- FIPS code: 36-049-20555
- GNIS feature ID: 978902
- Website: https://www.townofdianany.gov/

Diana is a town in Lewis County, New York, United States. The population was 1,709 at the 2010 census. The town is on the northeastern border of the county and is located northeast of Watertown. The northwestern section of Diana is in the Fort Drum military reservation.

== History ==
The town of Diana was established from part of the town of Watson in 1830. In 1841, part of the town was used to help establish the town of Croghan. It was named after the Roman goddess Diana.

The Alpina Archeological District and Lewisburg Archeological District were added to the National Register of Historic Places in 1995.

=== Notable person ===
- Joseph Bonaparte, the older brother of Napoleon, spent part of his exile living in the town near Natural Bridge. Lake Bonaparte in the northern part of the town is named after him.

== Geography ==
According to the United States Census Bureau, the town has a total area of 140.8 square miles (365 km^{2}), of which 137.1 square miles (355 km^{2}) are land and 3.7 square miles (9.6 km^{2}), or 2.63%, are water.

Part of the Fort Drum Military Reservation is in the northwestern reaches of the town.

The northeastern town line is the border of St. Lawrence County, and the eastern town line is the border of Herkimer County. The eastern part of the town is in the Adirondack Park.

New York State Route 3 passes across the town and links with New York State Route 812 south of Remington Center. The highways run conjointly near the northeastern town line.

The Indian River, part of the Oswegatchie River watershed, flows out the western side of Diana.

== Demographics ==
Historical population
Census	Pop.	Note	%±
1830	309		—
1840	883		185.8%
1850	970		9.9%
1860	1,483		52.9%
1870	1,778		19.9%
1880	2,026		13.9%
1890	2,395		18.2%
1900	2,083		−13.0%
1910	2,279		9.4%
1920	2,181		−4.3%
1930	2,080		−4.6%
1940	1,871		−10.0%
1950	1,717		−8.2%
1960	1,641		−4.4%
1970	1,649		0.5%
1980	1,709		3.6%
1990	1,743		2.0%
2000	1,660		−4.8%
2010	1,709		3.0%
2016 (est.)	1,704		−0.3%
U.S. Decennial Census

As of the census of 2000, there were 1,661 people, 642 households, and 473 families residing in the town. The population density was 12.1 inhabitants per square mile (4.7/km^{2}). There were 1,206 housing units at an average density of 8.8 per square mile (3.4/km^{2}). The racial makeup of the town was 97.11% White, 0.06% African American, 1.14% Native American, 0.48% Asian, 0.06% Pacific Islander, 0.06% from other races, and 1.08% from two or more races. Hispanic or Latino of any race were 0.54% of the population.

There were 642 households, out of which 32.7% had children under the age of 18 living with them, 63.4% were married couples living together, 6.5% had a female householder with no husband present, and 26.2% were non-families. 21.0% of all households were made up of individuals, and 10.0% had someone living alone who was 65 years of age or older. The average household size was 2.59 and the average family size was 3.00.

In the town, the population was spread out, with 25.8% under the age of 18, 7.3% from 18 to 24, 26.5% from 25 to 44, 27.8% from 45 to 64, and 12.5% who were 65 years of age or older. The median age was 38 years. For every 100 females, there were 95.6 males. For every 100 females age 18 and over, there were 98.4 males.

The median income for a household in the town was $33,900, and the median income for a family was $39,563. Males had a median income of $35,450 versus $21,813 for females. The per capita income for the town was $15,916. About 8.8% of families and 12.1% of the population were below the poverty line, including 15.5% of those under age 18 and 9.9% of those age 65 or over.

== Communities and locations in Diana ==
- Alpina – A location west of Lake Bonaparte, now inside Fort Drum.
- Bartlett Corners – A location east of Diana Center.
- Birch Island – An island in Lake Bonaparte.
- Blanchard Corners – A location east of Diana Center.
- Diana Center – A hamlet in the western part of the town on NY-3.
- Harrisville – The former village of Harrisville, now a hamlet, is in the northeastern part of the town, located on combined routes NY-3 and NY-812.
- Kimball Mill – A hamlet south of Harrisville.
- Lake Bonaparte (lake) – A lake in the northern part of Diana.
- Lake Bonaparte – A hamlet on the south shore of Lake Bonaparte.
- Lewisburg (formerly, "Louisburg" and "Sterlingbush") – A hamlet in the northwestern corner of Diana, now inside Fort Drum.
- Middle Branch Corners – A location in the eastern part of the town.
- Natural Bridge – A hamlet at the western town line.
- Oswegatchie Corners – A location northwest of Kimball Mill on NY-812.
- Remington Corners – A hamlet southwest of Harrisville village on NY-3.
- Rices Corners – A location at the northern tip of the town at the town line.
- Round Island – An island at the western end of Bonaparte Lake.
- Tinney Corners – A location in the eastern part of the town, south of Middle Branch Corners.
- Tyler Corners – A location southwest of Remington Corners on NY-3.
