= New York State Route 3A (disambiguation) =

New York State Route 3A is an east–west state highway in Jefferson County, New York, United States, that was established in the 1950s.

New York State Route 3A may also refer to:

- New York State Route 3A (1930–1932) in eastern Niagara and Orleans Counties
- New York State Route 3A (1932–1935) in central Niagara County
