= Natural Bridge, New York =

- Census-designated place
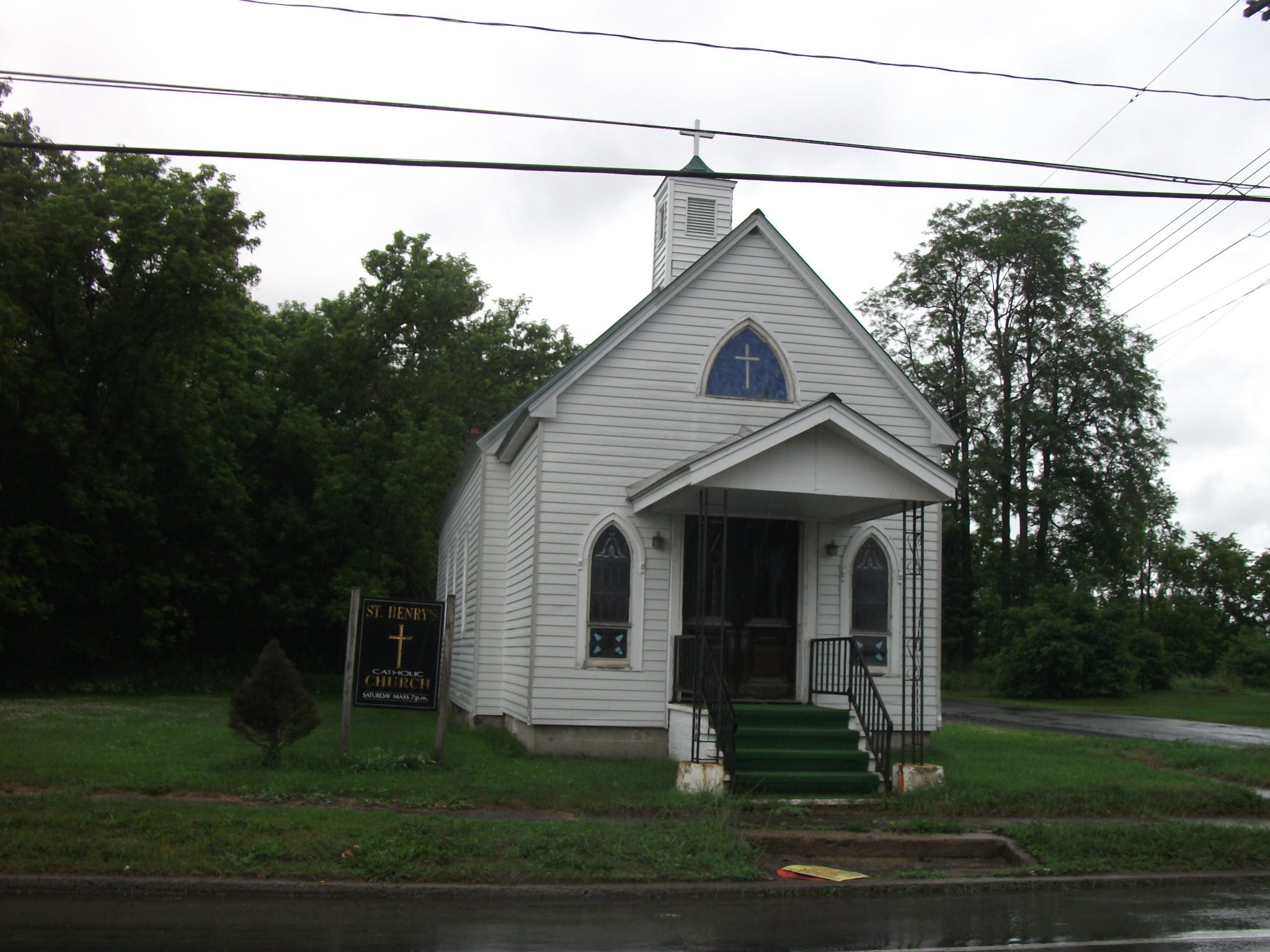
- Church in Natural Bridge

- Location within New York Location within the United States
- Coordinates: 44°4′7″N 75°29′41″W
- Country: United States
- State: New York
- County: Jefferson, Lewis
- Town: Wilna

Area
  - Total: 1.28 sq mi (3.31 km^{2})
  - Land: 1.28 sq mi (3.31 km^{2})
  - Water: 0 sq mi (0.00 km^{2})
- Elevation: 817 ft (249 m)

Population (2020)
  - Total: 296
  - Density: 231.8/sq mi (89.48/km^{2})
- Time zone: UTC-5 (Eastern (EST))
  - Summer (DST): UTC-4 (EDT)
- ZIP code: 13665
- Area code: 315
- FIPS code: 36-49605
- GNIS feature ID: 0958296

Natural Bridge is a hamlet and census-designated place (CDP) in Jefferson County, New York, United States. As of the 2020 census, Natural Bridge had a population of 296.

It is located in the northeastern corner of the town of Wilna and is east of Watertown. The name "Natural Bridge" was derived from Natural Bridge Caverns, marble cave which the Indian River runs underground through. Natural Bridge Station is a location along a railroad line southeast of the community in Lewis County.

== History ==
In 1812, a hunter, Aleaser Carr, crossed the Indian River on what he assumed to be a log while hunting. Much to his amazement while hunting a short time later, he again came to the river on the same side as before he crossed. After an examination by himself and a party of hunters, it appeared that he had unknowingly recrossed the river on what turned out to be a marble arch. Consequently, this is how Natural Bridge received its name.

Settlement began in the area in 1818. The former king of Spain, Joseph Bonaparte, known in America as the Count de Survilliers, owned land consisting of a one-mile square. After coming to look at his land in 1828, he was impressed by the limestone arch and with being so close to his lake, "Lake Bonaparte" (8 miles (13 km) to the northeast), he decided to build a second summer residence in Natural Bridge in 1829. He resided here with his "Madame" until 1835. The house was destroyed in September 1905 in a fire that also consumed two hotels and their barns, the country store, and another dwelling house.

Tourists at Natural Bridge Caverns

An old story which still proves to be a mystery today is of the Joseph Bonaparte residence. The cellar of the residence was supposedly connected by secret passage to the caverns so that if he ever needed to escape, he had this passage.

Natural Bridge Caverns, the hamlet's namesake, was formerly operated as a show cave, with tourists being ferried by boat on the underground portion of the Indian River.

== Geography ==
Natural Bridge is located along the eastern edge of Jefferson County at 44°4′7″N 75°29′41″W (44.068527, -75.494749), in the eastern part of the town of Wilna. It is bordered to the east by the town of Diana in Lewis County.

According to the United States Census Bureau, the CDP has a total area of 1.4 square miles (3.6 km^{2}), all land. The Indian River flows northward through the community to the east of the downtown area.

Natural Bridge is located on New York State Route 3 southeast of Fort Drum, at the western edge of the Adirondacks. Watertown, the Jefferson county seat, is 23 miles (37 km) to the southwest via Routes 3 and 3A, while Harrisville is 11 miles (18 km) to the northeast.

== Demographics ==
Historical population
Census	Pop.	Note	%±
2020	296		—
U.S. Decennial Census

As of the census of 2010, there were 365 people, 139 households, and 100 families residing in Natural Bridge. The racial makeup of the population was 94.8% White, 1.1% African American, 2.2% American Indian and Alaska Native, 0.3% Asian, and 1.1% from two or more races. 2.2% were Hispanic or Latino, 1.4% Mexican and 0.8% Puerto Rican.

There were 139 households, out of which 30.2% had children under the age of 18 living with them, 48.9% were Husband and Wife, 15.1% had a female householder with no husband present, and 28.1% were Nonfamily. 23.0% of all households were made up of individuals, and 8.3% had someone living alone who was 65 years of age or older. The average household size was 2.63 and the average family size was 3.05.

In the village the population was spread out, with 29.6% under the age of 18, 6.4% from 18 to 24, 30.9% from 25 to 44, 23.2% from 45 to 64, and 9.9% who were 65 years of age or older. The median age was 34 years. For every 100 females, there were 104.2 males. For every 100 females age 18 and over, there were 93.0 males.

The median income for a household in the community was $26,838, and the median income for a family was $25,662. Males had a median income of $18,571 versus $15,536 for females. The per capita income for the CDP was $10,349. About 20.4% of families and 26.4% of the population were below the poverty line, including 43.8% of those under age 18 and none of those age 65 or over.
