= Clay Dumaw =

American film director

- Born: Carthage, New York
- Occupation: Director • Screenwriter • Editor • Author
- Website: claydumaw.com

Clay Dumaw is an American film director, screenwriter, editor and author, best known for independent films.

He directed Get Out Alive (2012), Hold'em (2014) and Jack Wyatt and the Gun from Hell (2021). He also wrote Stay the Course: How I Began a Career in Film, a memoir about his early life and career.

== Early life ==
Clay was born in Carthage, New York. He studied Visual Communications at the Charles H. Bohlen Technical Center.

== Career ==
Clay began his career as an editor and visual effects artist, creating title sequences for independent productions. He wrote and directed two feature films, Get Out Alive (2012) and Hold'em (2014), which earned official selections at the Snowtown International Film Festival and the Buffalo International Film Festival. He later worked on national ads for Honda, Toyota, Ford, United States Olympic & Paralympic Committee, Professional Bull Riders, United States Anti-Doping Agency, Pikes Peak International Hill Climb and Space Force.

His third film, Jack Wyatt and the Gun from Hell (2021), was shot entirely on a green screen in Colorado Springs, with computer generated environments added in post-production. Post-production on Jack Wyatt and the Gun from Hell spanned nearly two years. It earned multiple awards at film festivals worldwide.

== Filmography ==
| Year | Title | Director | Writer | Editor | Producer | Notes |
|---|---|---|---|---|---|---|
| 2012 | Get Out Alive | Yes | Yes | Yes | Yes | |
| 2014 | Hold'em | Yes | Yes | Yes | Yes | Also Composer |
| 2021 | Jack Wyatt and the Gun from Hell | Yes | Yes | Yes | Yes | Also Visual Effects |

== Awards and nominations ==
| Year | Work | Festival | Award |
|---|---|---|---|
| 2012 | Get Out Alive | Scare-a-Con Film Festival | Official Selection |
| 2014 | Hold'em | Buffalo International Film Festival | Official Selection |
| 2015 | Hold'em | Snowtown International Film Festival | Official Selection |
| 2021 | Jack Wyatt and the Gun from Hell | The Wild Bunch Film Festival | Best Western Drama |
| 2021 | Jack Wyatt and the Gun from Hell | The Wild Bunch Film Festival | Best Colorado Film |
| 2021 | Jack Wyatt and the Gun from Hell | The Wild Bunch Film Festival | Best Sci Fi |
| 2021 | Jack Wyatt and the Gun from Hell | The Wild Bunch Film Festival | 1st Place Movie Poster |
| 2021 | Jack Wyatt and the Gun from Hell | Horsetooth Intl. Film Festival | Best Narrative Film |
| 2021 | Jack Wyatt and the Gun from Hell | The Tylerman Film Festival | Best Feature Film |
| 2021 | Jack Wyatt and the Gun from Hell | Cannes Independent Film Festival | Best Action Film |
| 2021 | Jack Wyatt and the Gun from Hell | Eastern Europe International Movie Awards | Best Western |
| 2021 | Jack Wyatt and the Gun from Hell | Rocky Mountain International Film Festival | Semi-Finalist |
| 2021 | Jack Wyatt and the Gun from Hell | Colorado International SciFi & Fantasy Film Festival | Finalist |
| 2021 | Jack Wyatt and the Gun from Hell | The Galactic Imaginarium Film Festival | Finalist |
| 2021 | Jack Wyatt and the Gun from Hell | Mindfield Film Festival | Finalist |
| 2021 | Jack Wyatt and the Gun from Hell | Syracuse International Film Festival | Official Selection |
| 2022 | Jack Wyatt and the Gun from Hell | Snowtown International Film Festival | Official Selection |

== Books ==
| Year | Title | Synopsis | Category |
|---|---|---|---|
| 2022 | Stay the Course: How I Began a Career in Film | A memoir about a young man in a rural town with a dream of directing movies. | Self-published |
