= Edward J. Westcott =

US Army brigadier general (1873–1926)

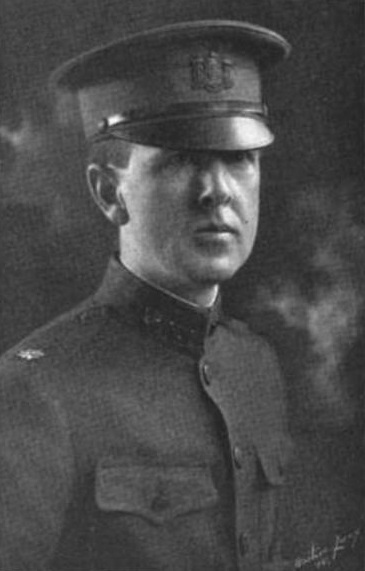
- Westcott at the time of his appointment as acting adjutant general of New York October 1918
- Born: October 14, 1873; Carthage, New York, US
- Died: February 9, 1926 (aged 52); Albany, New York, US
- Burial place: Albany Rural Cemetery, Menands, New York, US
- Education: Albany Law School
- Spouse: Norma Winifred Wright (m. 1903–1926)
- Children: 2
- Military career
- Service: United States Army; New York National Guard
- Service years: 1898–1900 (Army); 1901–1926 (National Guard)
- Rank: Brigadier General
- Units: 203rd New York Volunteer Infantry (Army); 10th Separate Infantry Battalion (New York National Guard)
- Commands: Adjutant General of New York
- Wars: Spanish–American War; World War I
- Other work: Attorney

Edward J. Westcott (14 October 1873 – 9 February 1926) was an American attorney and military officer. In addition to practicing law in Albany, New York, he served in the United States Army during the Spanish–American War. Westcott was a member of the New York National Guard from 1901 until his death. In 1923, Westcott was promoted to brigadier general and assigned as Adjutant General of New York. He continued to hold this post until his death.

== Early life ==
Edward John Westcott was born in Carthage, New York on 14 October 1873, the son of Asahel (Asa) B. Westcott and Martha E. Westcott. He was raised and educated in Carthage, and graduated from Carthage Senior High School. He graduated from Albany Law School in 1897, which was followed by studying law with attorney Willard Barnes Van Allen. After attaining admission to the bar, he practiced in Watertown, New York.

== Early career ==
In July 1898, Westcott began a military career when he enlisted in the United States Army for the Spanish–American War. Assigned as a private in the 203rd New York Infantry, a unit of United States Volunteers raised for the war, he served in Syracuse, New York and Greenville, South Carolina. He was hospitalized at Camp Black, New York from November 1898 to January 1899. Westcott was discharged on 13 January 1899.

In 1900, Westcott moved to Albany, New York to begin working fulltime in the office of the Adjutant General of New York. In February 1901, he joined the New York National Guard's 10th Separate Infantry Battalion as a private in Company A. He was promoted to corporal in November 1907 and sergeant in the quartermaster section of the 3rd Brigade in June 1909.

== Later career ==
In May 1912, Westcott was commissioned as a second lieutenant in the 10th Infantry. In August 1915, he was appointed assistant to the adjutant general. Westcott was promoted to major in July 1916. In 1917, the U.S. military expanded in anticipation of U.S. entry into World War I, and America entered the conflict in April 1917. Westcott played a prominent role in the New York National Guard's wartime activities, and he received appointment as assistant adjutant general and promotion to lieutenant colonel in June 1918. He was acting adjutant general from September 1918 to January 1919. He then returned to the assistant adjutant general's position, and he was promoted to colonel in March 1919.

Westcott was appointed Adjutant General of New York by Governor Al Smith in November 1923 and received promotion to brigadier general. Smith appointed him to a full two-year term in January 1925, and Westcott continued to serve until his death. In early 1926, Westcott became ill with kidney disease. He died in Albany on 9 February. Westcott was buried at Albany Rural Cemetery in Menands, New York. He was succeeded as adjutant general by Franklin W. Ward.

== Effective dates of promotion ==
Westcott's effective dates of promotion were:

- Private (Army), 14 July 1898
- Private (National Guard), 28 February 1901
- Corporal (National Guard), 23 November 1907
- Sergeant (National Guard), 8 June 1909
- Second Lieutenant (National Guard), 23 May 1912
- Major (National Guard), 31 July 1916
- Lieutenant Colonel (National Guard), 28 June 1918
- Colonel (National Guard), 19 March 1919
- Brigadier General (National Guard), 28 November 1923
