= Fletcher Brothers =

American preacher

Pastor Fletcher A. Brothers is a fundamentalist preacher and author from Carthage, New York.

== Freedom Village ==
Brothers is best known as the founder of Freedom Village USA, a home for troubled teens operated from a Christian Fundamentalist perspective and founded in Lakemont, New York in 1981. The campus was the site of the Lakemont Academy, a secular boys and girls boarding school. Freedom Village also operated an office in Burlington, Ontario and it had many students from Canada.

Freedom Village came under fire when it was revealed to be paying workers less than minimum wage, and for the punishment practiced on students, and for allegedly abusing child labor laws as well as many cases of sexual abuse from other residents or grooming from staff members like Zodaman Weyhe among others including other "senior residents" often performing hazing rituals like having to run across the "quad" naked and also including the "woodpile" carrying logs in and endless circles for anywhere from 8 hours through the day or 4 hour pushes to even up to 5am to 10pm. It was either 5-7 then 2-4 then 6-10, 6-10 or the dreaded 5am to 10pm no school. There was also times where the monitor could yell NO PUT DOWN and that means you to endlessly carry YOUR log from 2lbs to 50lbs stumps until they say stop. 10 mins to hours. The abuse on food, rations and more were truly endless

Brothers had to sell the Lakemont property to cover his millions of dollars in debt after he was denied the ability to file for bankruptcy.

The podcast We Warned Them: Freedom Village investigated the legacy of Freedom Village and the life of Fletcher Brothers, revealing their larger connections to the 'troubled teen' industry.
