= Wilna, New York =

- Town
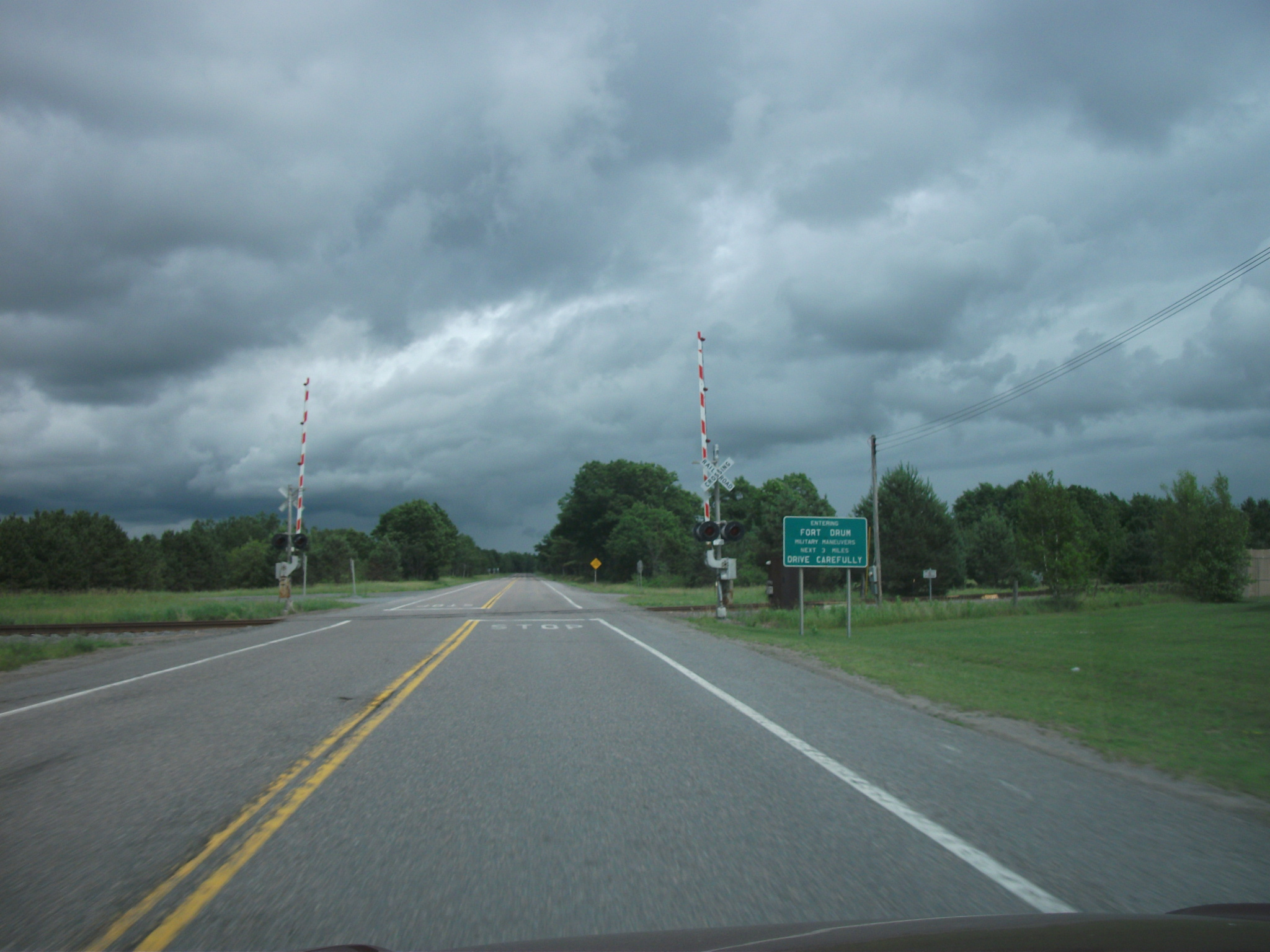
- New York State Route 3A and Jefferson County Route 36 at the entrance to Fort Drum in the town of Wilna.

- Location within New York Location within the United States
- Coordinates: 44°1′5″N 75°35′49″W
- Country: United States
- State: New York
- County: Jefferson

Government
  - Type: Town Council
  - Town Supervisor: Paul H. Smith (D)
  - Town Council: Members' List: • Daniel Nevills (R); • Marco Franchini (D); • Michael F. Storms (D); • Francis Skvorak (D)

Area
  - Total: 79.32 sq mi (205.43 km^{2})
  - Land: 78.42 sq mi (203.11 km^{2})
  - Water: 0.90 sq mi (2.32 km^{2})
- Elevation: 720 ft (220 m)

Population (2020)
  - Total: 5,732
- Time zone: UTC-5 (Eastern (EST))
  - Summer (DST): UTC-4 (EDT)
- ZIP Codes: 13619 (Carthage); 13628 (Deferiet); 13665 (Natural Bridge); 13602 (Fort Drum)
- Area code: 315
- FIPS code: 36-045-82348
- GNIS feature ID: 0979645
- Website: townofwilnany.gov

Wilna is a town in Jefferson County, New York, United States. The population was 5,732 at the 2020 census. The town is on the eastern side of the county and is east of Watertown.

== History ==
The town was first settled around 1798 at the location of the future village of Carthage. The town of Wilna was officially established in 1813 from parts of the town of Le Ray and the Lewis County town of Leyden. The origin of the name of the town is obscure, although it is alleged to be named after the German and Polish spelling ("Wilno") of Vilnius, in commemoration of the French occupation of Vilnius in 1812.

Wood's Grist Mill was listed on the National Register of Historic Places in 1995.

== Geography ==
According to the United States Census Bureau, the town has a total area of 79.5 square miles (205.9 km^{2}), of which 78.6 square miles (203.6 km^{2}) are land and 0.89 square miles (2.3 km^{2}), or 1.10%, are water. The Black River flows along the southwest border of the town, and the Indian River is in the north.

The northern half of the town's area is within the Fort Drum Military Reservation.

New York State Route 3 and New York State Route 3A are east-west highways.

== Demographics ==
Historical population
Census	Pop.	Note	%±
1820	648		—
1830	1,602		147.2%
1840	2,591		61.7%
1850	2,993		15.5%
1860	3,662		22.4%
1870	4,660		27.3%
1880	4,393		−5.7%
1890	4,522		2.9%
1900	5,172		14.4%
1910	6,218		20.2%
1920	7,014		12.8%
1930	7,322		4.4%
1940	7,029		−4.0%
1950	6,969		−0.9%
1960	6,809		−2.3%
1970	6,538		−4.0%
1980	6,227		−4.8%
1990	6,899		10.8%
2000	6,235		−9.6%
2010	6,427		3.1%
2020	5,732		−10.8%
U.S. Decennial Census

As of the census of 2000, there were 6,235 people, 2,335 households, and 1,639 families residing in the town. The population density was 79.0 inhabitants per square mile (30.5/km^{2}). There were 2,658 housing units at an average density of 33.7 per square mile (13.0/km^{2}). The racial makeup of the town was 92.83% White, 2.92% African American, 0.72% Native American, 0.91% Asian, 0.03% Pacific Islander, 0.85% from other races, and 1.73% from two or more races. Hispanic or Latino of any race were 2.10% of the population.

There were 2,335 households, out of which 35.6% had children under the age of 18 living with them, 53.4% were married couples living together, 12.6% had a female householder with no husband present, and 29.8% were non-families. 24.0% of all households were made up of individuals, and 10.8% had someone living alone who was 65 years of age or older. The average household size was 2.61 and the average family size was 3.08.

In the town, the population was spread out, with 28.1% under the age of 18, 8.2% from 18 to 24, 29.1% from 25 to 44, 21.6% from 45 to 64, and 13.0% who were 65 years of age or older. The median age was 35 years. For every 100 females, there were 95.8 males. For every 100 females age 18 and over, there were 91.1 males.

The median income for a household in the town was $29,103, and the median income for a family was $35,022. Males had a median income of $29,119 versus $19,655 for females. The per capita income for the town was $13,556. About 15.7% of families and 20.4% of the population were below the poverty line, including 29.3% of those under age 18 and 10.6% of those age 65 or over.

== Communities and locations in Wilna ==
- Carthage – A village located at the southern end of the town on NY-3 by the Black River.
- Cowan Corners – A location west of Natural Bridge.
- Deferiet – A village along the southwestern town line on NY-3A by the Black River.
- DeVoice Corners – A location at the intersection of County Routes 40 and 42.
- Doolins Crossing – A location by the northwestern town line, within Fort Drum.
- Fargo – A location by the Fort Drum reservation boundary on NY-3.
- Fort Drum – Part of the military reservation occupies the northern part of the town.
- Gates Corners – A location inside Fort Drum on NY-3.
- Herrings – A hamlet and census-designated place on the southwestern town line on NY-3 by the Black River.
- Hewitt Park – A location north of Carthage on NY-3.
- Hubbards Crossing – A location in the western part of the town, within Fort Drum.
- Karter Crossing – A location in the eastern part of Wilna, near North Croghan.
- Mt. Quillen – A hill north of Carthage.
- Natural Bridge – A hamlet and census-designated place by the eastern town line on NY-3.
- North Croghan – A location by the eastern town line on County Road 40.
- North Wilna – A location in the northern part of the town, within Fort Drum.
- Ormistead Corners – A location in the southeastern part of Wilna on NY-3 at the junction of County Road 42.
- Reedsville A location by the northwestern town line, within Fort Drum.
- Woods Mills ("Woods Settlement") – A location in the southeastern part of Wilna, located inside Fort Drum.
