= Rutland, New York =

- Town
- Location within New York Location within the United States
- Coordinates: 43°57′35″N 75°47′39″W
- Country: United States
- State: New York
- County: Jefferson

Government
  - Type: Town Council
  - Town Supervisor: Gary Eddy (R)
  - Town Council: Members' List: • Raymond P. Cramer (R); • Michael Gillette (R); • Kenneth Gleason, Jr. (R); • Clarence Woodruff (R)

Area
  - Total: 45.57 sq mi (118.03 km^{2})
  - Land: 45.24 sq mi (117.17 km^{2})
  - Water: 0.33 sq mi (0.86 km^{2})
- Elevation: 978 ft (298 m)

Population (2020)
  - Total: 3,038
  - Estimate (2016): 3,014
  - Density: 66.6/sq mi (25.72/km^{2})
- Time zone: UTC-5 (Eastern (EST))
  - Summer (DST): UTC-4 (EDT)
- ZIP Codes: 13612 (Black River); 13626 (South Rutland); 13638 (Felts Mills); 13601 (Watertown); 13619 (Carthage)
- Area code: 315
- FIPS code: 36-045-64265
- GNIS feature ID: 0979444
- Website: https://townofrutland-ny.org/

Rutland is a town in Jefferson County, New York, United States. The population was 3,038 at the 2020 census.

Rutland is in the eastern part of the county, east of Watertown and southwest of Fort Drum.

== History ==
Prehistoric remains are evidence of an original early native population. The first modern settlement took place near Rutland Center circa 1799.

The town was formed from part of the town of Watertown in 1802, before the establishment of Jefferson County. In 1844, an island in the Black River at Felts Mills was annexed from the town of Le Ray.

== Geography ==
According to the United States Census Bureau, the town has a total area of 45.4 square miles (117.5 km^{2}), of which 45.1 square miles (116.8 km^{2}) are land and 0.3 square miles (0.7 km^{2}), or 0.61%, are water. The Black River defines the northern town line, and most of the southern town line is the county line of Lewis County.

New York State Route 12 and New York State Route 126 are east–west highways through the central part of the town. New York State Route 3 follows the south bank of the Black River.

The community of Black River set itself apart from Rutland and the town of Le Ray by incorporating as a village in 1891.

== Demographics ==
Historical population
Census	Pop.	Note	%±
1820	1,945		—
1830	2,339		20.3%
1840	2,090		−10.6%
1850	2,265		8.4%
1860	2,097		−7.4%
1870	1,903		−9.3%
1880	1,796		−5.6%
1890	1,798		0.1%
1900	1,885		4.8%
1910	1,862		−1.2%
1920	1,810		−2.8%
1930	1,734		−4.2%
1940	1,622		−6.5%
1950	1,925		18.7%
1960	2,229		15.8%
1970	2,448		9.8%
1980	2,685		9.7%
1990	3,023		12.6%
2000	2,959		−2.1%
2010	3,060		3.4%
2020	3,038		−0.7%
2016 (est.)	3,014		−1.5%
U.S. Decennial Census

As of the census of 2000, there were 2,959 people, 1,097 households, and 840 families residing in the town. The population density was 65.5 inhabitants per square mile (25.3/km^{2}). There were 1,178 housing units at an average density of 26.1 per square mile (10.1/km^{2}). The racial makeup of the town was 95.34% White, 1.49% African American, 0.41% Native American, 0.68% Asian, 0.03% Pacific Islander, 0.84% from other races, and 1.22% from two or more races. Hispanic or Latino of any race were 1.82% of the population.

There were 1,097 households, out of which 36.9% had children under the age of 18 living with them, 58.1% were married couples living together, 12.7% had a female householder with no husband present, and 23.4% were non-families. 17.8% of all households were made up of individuals, and 5.1% had someone living alone who was 65 years of age or older. The average household size was 2.70 and the average family size was 3.02.

In the town, the population was spread out, with 27.2% under the age of 18, 7.8% from 18 to 24, 32.6% from 25 to 44, 22.5% from 45 to 64, and 9.8% who were 65 years of age or older. The median age was 36 years. For every 100 females, there were 102.8 males. For every 100 females age 18 and over, there were 99.1 males.

The median income for a household in the town was $36,417, and the median income for a family was $38,906. Males had a median income of $30,040 versus $21,450 for females. The per capita income for the town was $14,919. About 10.3% of families and 12.1% of the population were below the poverty line, including 17.7% of those under age 18 and 4.1% of those age 65 or over.

== Communities and locations in Rutland ==
- Black River – A village along the northern town line and the Black River, half in Rutland and half in Le Ray. It was once called "Lockport".
- Felts Mills – A hamlet (and census-designated place) by the northern town line and the Black River. A mill was built in 1800, establishing the community.
- Harpers Ferry – A hamlet on NY-126 at County Road 163, east of Rutland Center.
- Rutland Center – A hamlet on NY-126.
- Rutland Hollow – A shallow valley in the northwestern part of the town.
- Rutland Lake – A small lake near Rutland Center.
- Sandy Creek – A stream flowing through the southern part of Rutland.
- Tylerville – A hamlet in the southern part of town at the junction of County Roads 69 and 161. The community dates from circa 1805 and was originally called "South Rutland".
- Underwood Hill – An elevation in the southwestern part of Rutland.
