= Felts Mills, New York =

- Census-designated place
- Location within New York Location within the United States
- Coordinates: 44°1′18″N 75°45′46″W
- Country: United States
- State: New York
- County: Jefferson
- Town: Rutland

Area
  - Total: 0.60 sq mi (1.55 km^{2})
  - Land: 0.59 sq mi (1.52 km^{2})
  - Water: 0.015 sq mi (0.04 km^{2})
- Elevation: 580 ft (180 m)

Population (2020)
  - Total: 473
  - Density: 807.7/sq mi (311.86/km^{2})
- Time zone: UTC-5 (Eastern (EST))
  - Summer (DST): UTC-4 (EDT)
- ZIP Codes: 13638 (Felts Mills); 13612 (Black River)
- Area code: 315
- FIPS code: 36-25571
- GNIS feature ID: 0949970

Felts Mills is a hamlet and census-designated place (CDP) in the town of Rutland of Jefferson County, New York, United States. The population was 473 at the 2020 census. Felts Mills' original name was "Mid Road" because it is close to the halfway point between Watertown and Carthage.

== History ==
Felts Mills was sited on one of several natural falls on the Black River and first settled with the construction of a gristmill in about 1800. An improved dam was erected in 1821, and a stone mill in the following year. In 1824, John Felts constructed the large sawmills that gave the town its name. In 1889, the Taggart Paper Company built a large paper mill on an island across the river, ruins of which are still visible today.

== Geography ==
The community is in the northeast corner of the town of Rutland, east of the center of Jefferson County. New York State Route 3 passes through the CDP, leading west 8 miles (13 km) to Watertown, the county seat, and east 10 miles (16 km) to Carthage.

According to the U.S. Census Bureau, the Felts Mills CDP has an area of 0.33 square miles (0.85 km^{2}), all land.

== Demographics ==
In the 2020 Decennial Census a population of 473 was determined, 27 of which are Hispanic or Latino. In the 2023 American Community Survey, a Median Household Income was estimated to be $60,938 for a total of 192 households. Regarding education, 19,4% have Bachelor's degrees or higher, and employment is 55,3%.

Historical population
Census	Pop.	Note	%±
2020	473		—
U.S. Decennial Census
