= Deferiet, New York =

- Village
- Location within New York Location within the United States
- Coordinates: 44°2′3″N 75°40′58″W
- Country: United States
- State: New York
- County: Jefferson
- Town: Wilna

Area
  - Total: 0.75 sq mi (1.95 km^{2})
  - Land: 0.68 sq mi (1.75 km^{2})
  - Water: 0.077 sq mi (0.20 km^{2})
- Elevation: 660 ft (200 m)

Population (2020)
  - Total: 245
  - Density: 363.2/sq mi (140.23/km^{2})
- Time zone: UTC-5 (Eastern (EST))
  - Summer (DST): UTC-4 (EDT)
- ZIP Codes: 13628 (Deferiet); 13619 (Carthage)
- FIPS code: 36-19994
- GNIS feature ID: 948249
- Website: https://deferiet.racog.org/

Deferiet is a village in Jefferson County, New York, United States. As of the 2020 census, Deferiet had a population of 245. The village is named after settler Jenika de Ferriet.

Deferiet is on the southwestern side of the town of Wilna, east of Watertown and south of Fort Drum.

== Geography ==
Deferiet is located in eastern Jefferson County at 44°2′3″N 75°40′58″W (44.034248, -75.682892). Its western border follows the Black River, separating the village from the town of Champion.

According to the United States Census Bureau, Deferiet has a total area of 0.73 square miles (1.9 km^{2}), of which 0.66 square miles (1.7 km^{2}) are land and 0.1 square miles (0.2 km^{2}), or 11.21%, are water.

Deferiet is located on New York State Route 3, which leads west 12 miles (19 km) to Watertown, the Jefferson county seat, and southeast 6 miles (10 km) to Carthage. Route 3A intersects NY-3 in Deferiet and leads east 5 miles (8 km) to a second junction with NY-3 in the hamlet of Fargo.

== Demographics ==
Historical population
Census	Pop.	Note	%±
1930	739		—
1940	620		−16.1%
1950	616		−0.6%
1960	470		−23.7%
1970	347		−26.2%
1980	326		−6.1%
1990	293		−10.1%
2000	309		5.5%
2010	294		−4.9%
2020	245		−16.7%
U.S. Decennial Census

As of the census of 2000, there were 309 people, 120 households, and 92 families residing in the village. The population density was 434.8 inhabitants per square mile (167.9/km^{2}). There were 134 housing units at an average density of 188.6 per square mile (72.8/km^{2}). The racial makeup of the village was 93.20% White, 1.62% African American, 1.62% Native American, 1.62% Asian, 1.29% from other races, and 0.65% from two or more races. Hispanic or Latino of any race were 1.29% of the population.

There were 120 households, out of which 33.3% had children under the age of 18 living with them, 65.0% were married couples living together, 9.2% had a female householder with no husband present, and 23.3% were non-families. 19.2% of all households were made up of individuals, and 12.5% had someone living alone who was 65 years of age or older. The average household size was 2.58 and the average family size was 2.86.

In the village, the population was spread out, with 26.2% under the age of 18, 4.2% from 18 to 24, 25.9% from 25 to 44, 23.3% from 45 to 64, and 20.4% who were 65 years of age or older. The median age was 40 years. For every 100 females, there were 98.1 males. For every 100 females age 18 and over, there were 88.4 males.

The median income for a household in the village was $34,688, and the median income for a family was $36,250. Males had a median income of $26,875 versus $21,750 for females. The per capita income for the village was $15,650. About 16.2% of families and 13.3% of the population were below the poverty line, including 18.9% of those under the age of eighteen and 10.8% of those 65 or over.
