= United States Post Office (Carthage, New York) =

- US Post Office-Carthage
- U.S. National Register of Historic Places
- Location within New York Location within the United States
- Location: 521 State St., Carthage, New York
- Coordinates: 43°58′49″N 75°36′27″W
- Area: less than one acre
- Built: 1934
- Architect: US Treasury Dept.; Simon, Louis A.
- Architectural style: Colonial Revival
- MPS: US Post Offices in New York State, 1858-1943, TR
- NRHP reference No.: 88002470
- Added to NRHP: November 17, 1988

US Post Office-Carthage is a historic post office building located at Carthage in Jefferson County, New York. It was designed and built in 1934–1935, and is one of a number of post offices in New York State designed by the Office of the Supervising Architect of the Treasury Department, Louis A. Simon. The one story brick building is in the Colonial Revival style. It features a central pavilion with the entrance and flanking tripartite windows, set beneath a portico supported by four Doric columns.

It was listed on the National Register of Historic Places in 1988.
