= New York State Route 3A =

Highway in Jefferson County, New York

New York State Route 3A
- Map of the Jefferson County area with NY 3A highlighted in red

Route information
- Maintained by Jefferson County
- Length: 5.19 mi (8.35 km)
- Existed: September 1950–present

Major junctions
- West end: NY 3 in Deferiet
- East end: NY 3 in Wilna

Location
- Country: United States
- State: New York
- Counties: Jefferson

Highway system
- New York Highways; Interstate; US; State; Reference; Parkways
← NY 3	→ US 4

New York State Route 3A (NY 3A) is a county-maintained state highway in Jefferson County, New York, in the United States. The route is an alternate route of NY 3 between the village of Deferiet and Fargo, a hamlet within the town of Wilna. While NY 3 veers south to serve the village of Carthage, NY 3A follows a direct east–west alignment between the two communities. The eastern half of the route passes through the Fort Drum limits. All of NY 3A is co-designated as County Route 36 (CR 36) and is co-signed as such.

The origins of the route date back to the 1930s when it was first designated as part of NY 3. The alignments of NY 3 and New York State Route 3G between Deferiet and Fargo were flipped c. 1938, placing NY 3 on its modern alignment via Carthage and NY 3G on modern NY 3A. The NY 3G designation was eliminated in the 1940s. Its former alignment went unnumbered until September 1950, when it was redesignated as NY 3A.

== Route description ==
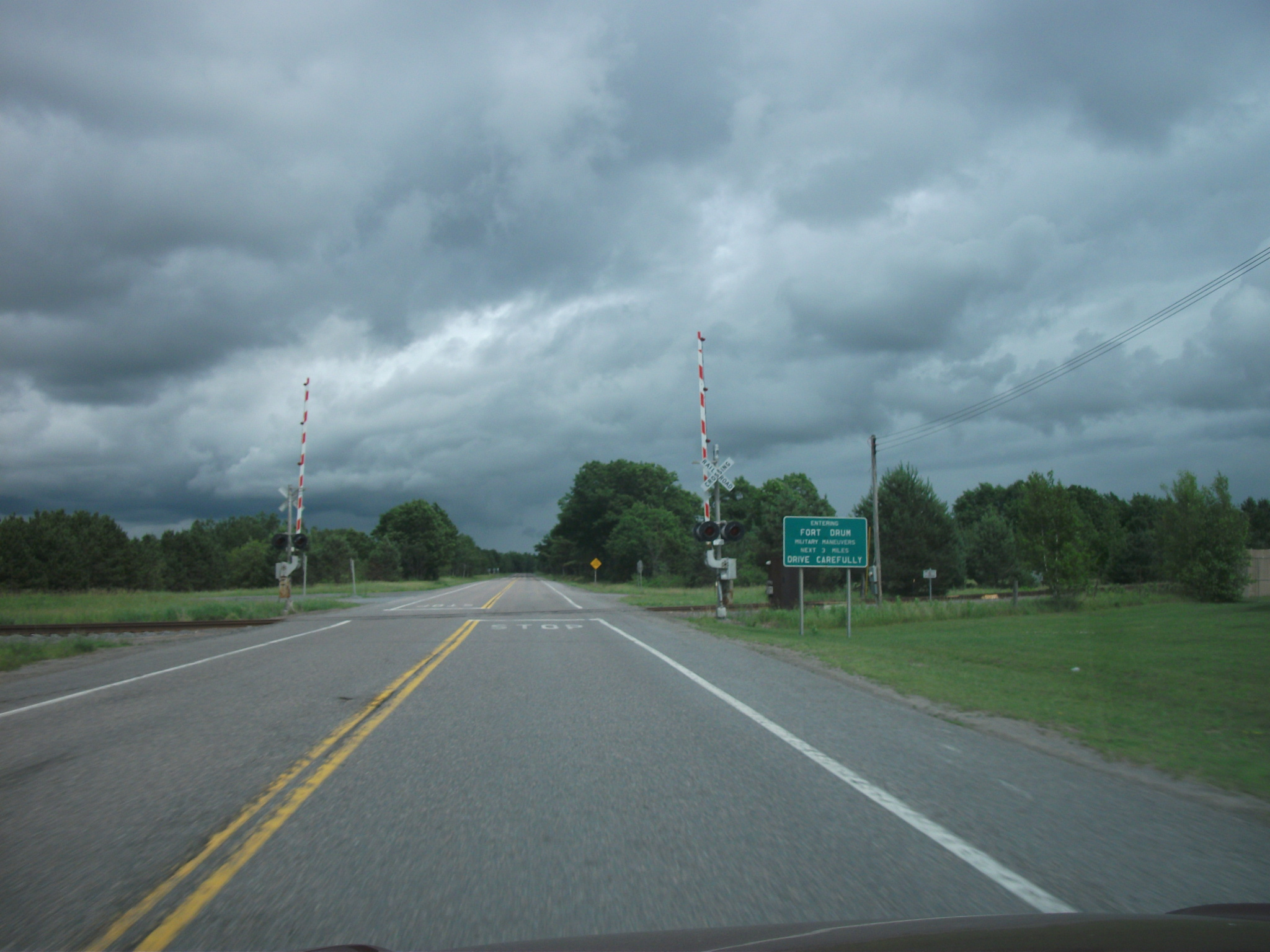
NY 3A and CR 36 approaching the railroad tracks that mark the entrance to Fort Drum in Wilna

NY 3A begins at an intersection with NY 3 in the village of Deferiet. It heads northeastward, passing to the south of the village center as it heads through an undeveloped area of the community. It continues across a small canal and past a chemical plant before turning eastward and leaving the Deferiet village limits. The route heads on through the town of Wilna, passing through a small, unnamed community built up around CR 37 and little else before entering the limits of Fort Drum. While in Fort Drum, NY 3A heads through a dense forest as it heads across an area with no development whatsoever. This trend finally ceases in the small hamlet of Fargo, where NY 3A passes by a handful of buildings before ending at another junction with NY 3. All of NY 3A is maintained by Jefferson County; as a result, it is co-designated and co-signed as CR 36.

== History ==
NY 3 originally went through Carthage on its way from Deferiet to Fargo. It was realigned c. 1931 to bypass Carthage to the north on modern NY 3A. The former routing of NY 3 between Deferiet and Carthage was originally designated as NY 3F; however, it was redesignated as NY 3G by the following year. NY 3 was moved back to the Deferiet–Carthage–Fargo alignment c. 1938 while the NY 3G designation was transferred to the former routing of NY 3 between Deferiet and Fargo. The NY 3G designation was removed in the 1940s. Its former routing remained unnumbered until September 1950, when it was redesignated as NY 3A.

In 2016, a study by the Missile Defense Agency of the United States Department of Defense proposed the idea of shutting down NY 3A to the public for a missile defense site at Fort Drum. Ceasing to be a public highway, the traffic that would follow NY 3A (AADT of 2,298) would be directed onto NY 3 directly through the village of Carthage.

== Major intersections ==
The entire route is in Jefferson County.

Location	mi	km	Destinations	Notes
Deferiet	0.00	0.00	NY 3 / CR 36 – Carthage, Great Bend	Western terminus; western terminus of CR 36 and concurrency with NY 3A
Wilna			CR 37 – Carthage	
Wilna	5.19	8.35	NY 3 / CR 36 – Harrisville, Carthage, Adirondack Region	Eastern terminus; eastern terminus of CR 36 and concurrency with NY 3A; hamlet of Fargo
1.000 mi = 1.609 km; 1.000 km = 0.621 mi: Concurrency terminus

== See also ==
- List of county routes in Jefferson County, New York
