= First Baptist Church and Cook Memorial Building =

Historic church in New York, United States

- U.S. National Register of Historic Places
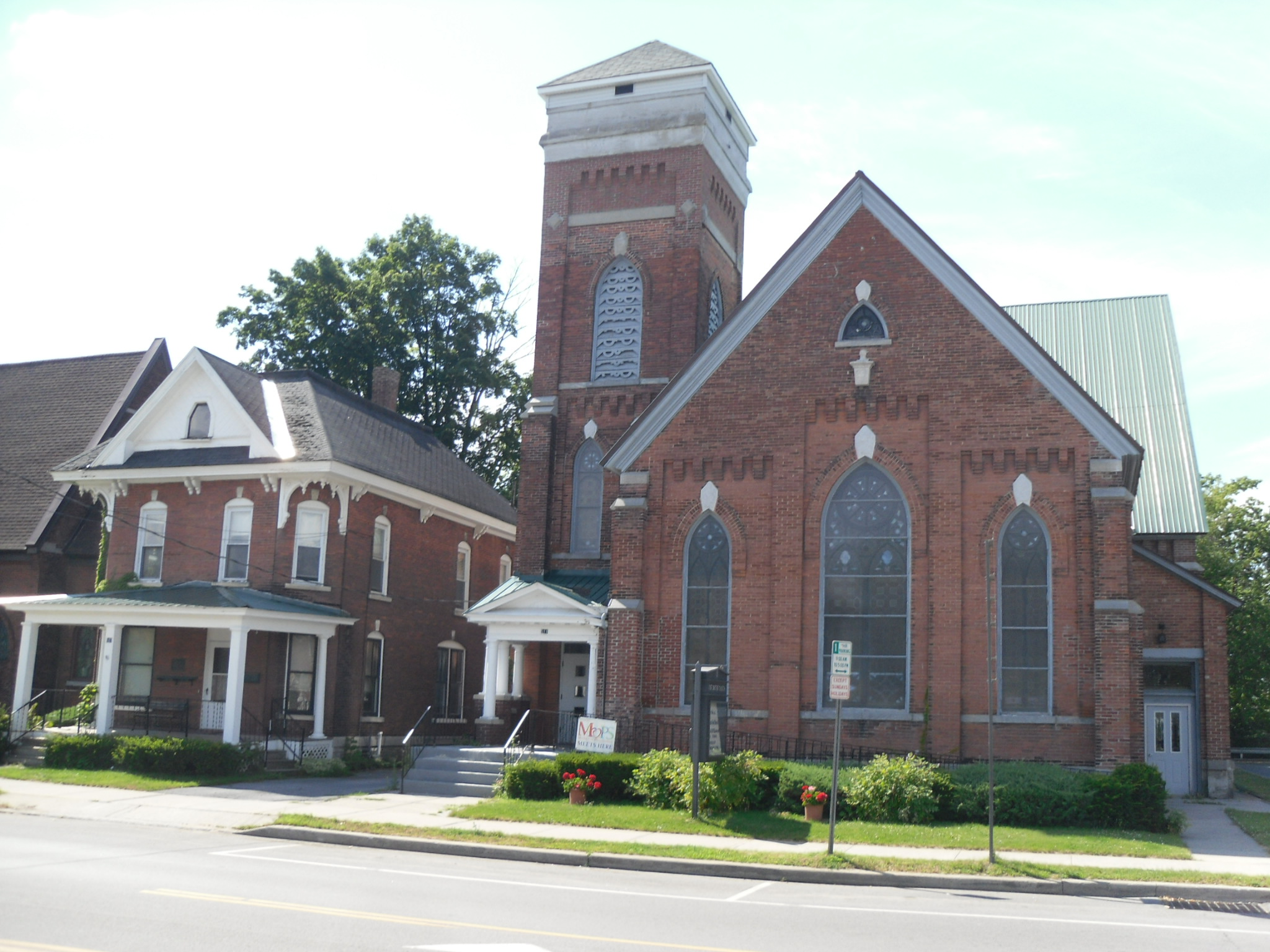
- First Baptist Church and Cook Memorial Building, July 2010

- Location within New York Location within the United States
- Location: 511 State St., Carthage, New York
- Coordinates: 43°58′55″N 75°36′29″W
- Area: 0.4 acres (0.16 ha)
- Built: 1860
- Architectural style: Gothic, Romanesque
- NRHP reference No.: 05000016
- Added to NRHP: February 9, 2005

First Baptist Church and Cook Memorial Building is a historic Baptist church located at Carthage in Jefferson County, New York. The church was built in 1885 and is a vernacular Gothic / Romanesque Revival–style edifice. It is of brick with stone trim and features asymmetrical massing, a multi-story bell tower, broad cross gables, corbelled brick cornices, stone-capped brick buttresses, and lencet-arched stained glass windows. The Cook Memorial Building dates to the 1860s-1870s and is a two-story brick dwelling with a variety of Italianate style and late Victorian eclectic features.

It was listed on the National Register of Historic Places in 2005.
