= State Street Historic District (Carthage, New York) =

Historic district in New York, United States

- U.S. National Register of Historic Places
- U.S. Historic district
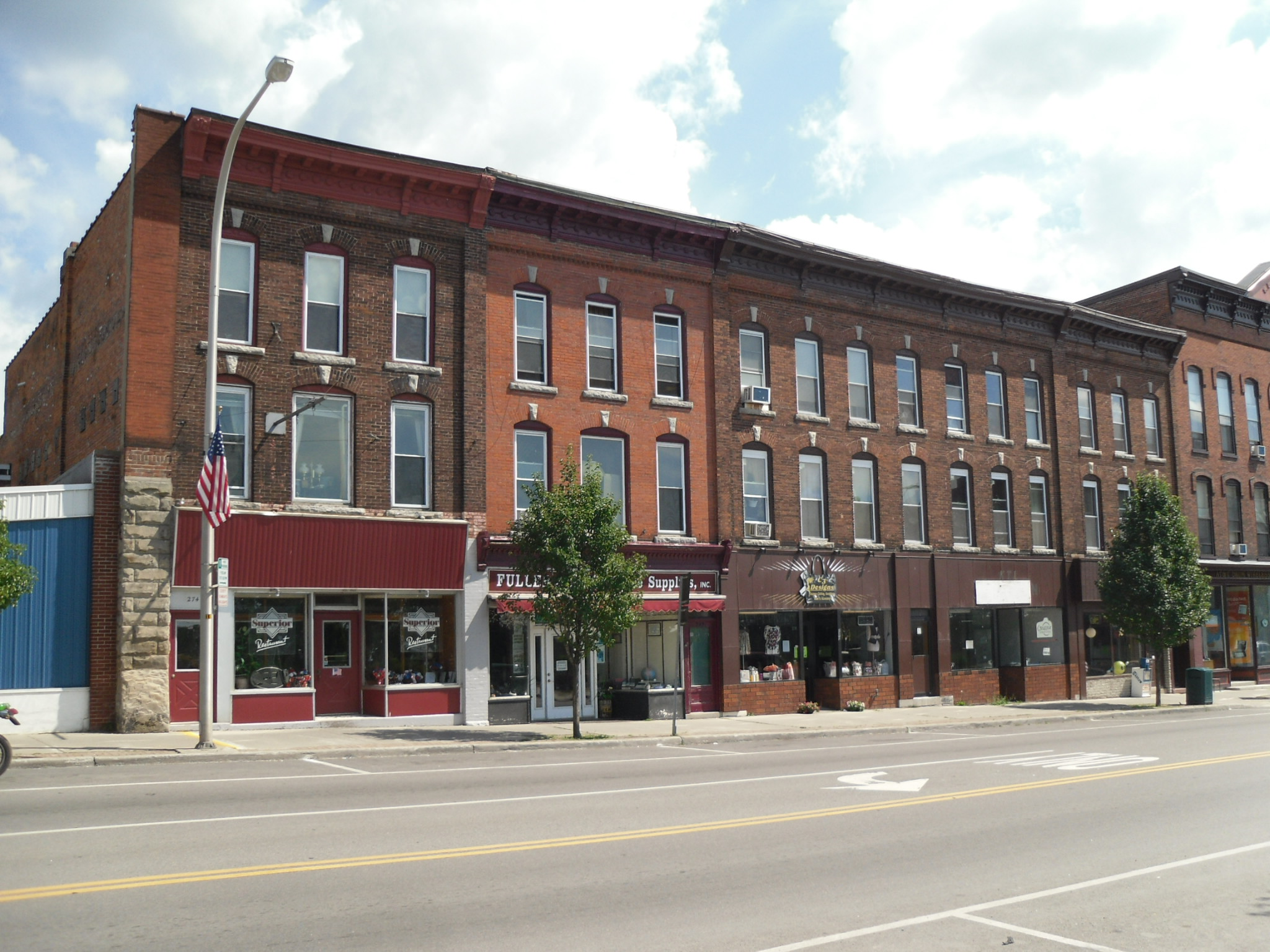
- State Street Historic District, July 2010

- Location within New York Location within the United States
- Location: 249-401 State St., 246-274 State St. and 106-108 Mechanic St., Carthage, New York
- Coordinates: 43°58′40″N 75°36′36″W
- Area: 6 acres (2.4 ha)
- Built: 1862
- Architect: Multiple
- Architectural style: Italianate, Romanesque, Richardsonian
- NRHP reference No.: 83001684
- Added to NRHP: September 22, 1983

State Street Historic District is a national historic district located at Carthage in Jefferson County, New York. The district includes 26 contributing buildings. They are attached brick commercial buildings built between 1860 and 1900 in a variety of styles.

It was listed on the National Register of Historic Places in 1983.

== Gallery ==
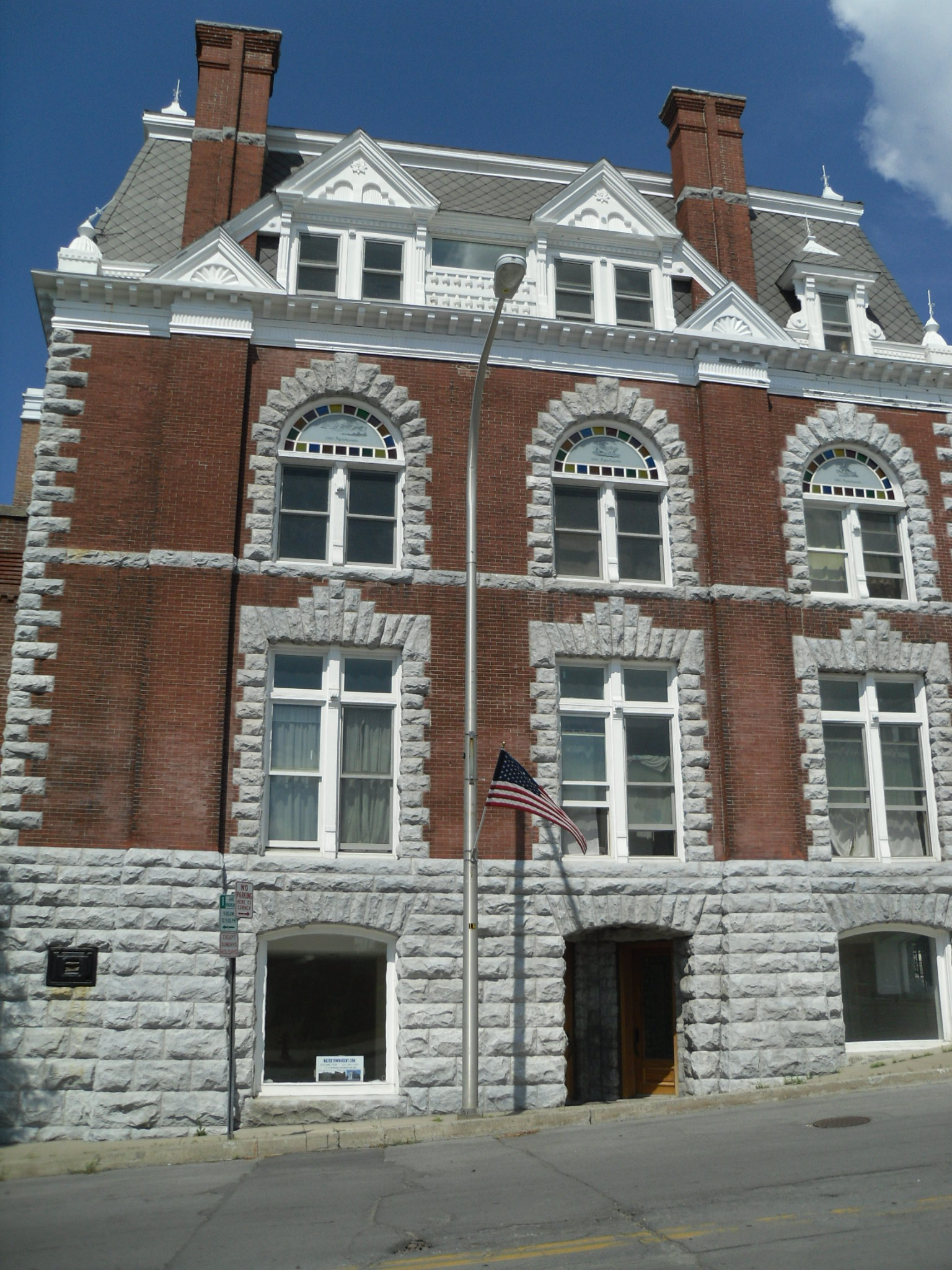
State Street Historic District, July 2010
