= Hold'em (film) =

- Film Festival Poster
- Directed by: Clay Dumaw
- Written by: Clay Dumaw
- Produced by: Clay Dumaw
- Starring: Richard Cooke; Jay Storey; David Iannotti
- Edited by: Clay DuMaw
- Production company: Clay Pigeon Studios
- Release date: 2014
- Country: United States
- Language: English

Hold'em is a 2014 American thriller film directed by Clay Dumaw. The film's plot combines Texas hold 'em with elements from horror and thriller films such as Battle Royale and Saw.

== Synopsis ==
Former poker pro, Jake Emerson joins an underground card game with a million dollars at stake, but the entry fee is more than he bargained for. He along with long-time rivals Marcus Lester and Cyrus Wolf assemble in a dreary warehouse for a battle royale of cards. Each player who loses is killed, and the last man standing walks away an undisputed champion.

== Cast ==
- Richard Cooke as Jake Emerson
- Jay Storey as Nathaniel Savage
- Peter Doroha as Cyrus Wolf
- David Iannotti as Marcus Lester
- Fyne Print Williams as Valentine
- John Henderson as Bruno Grimes
- Eric Scordo as Otto Freeman
- Dalton Beach as Elmo Richards
- Hassan McKnight as Henchmen

== Production ==
The film was shot almost entirely handheld, and the cast supplied their own wardrobe. Because much of the production took place at night, the windows in the film's primary location had to be digitally corrected to appear as though it were day. Peter Doroha's identical twin brother, Stephen Doroha, did all his stunts and was his stand-in on days when he couldn't be on set.

== Reception ==
The film received an Official Selection at the 2014 Scare-a-Con Film Festival. It also screened at the 2014 Buffalo International Film Festival and the 2015 Snowtown Film Festival.
