= Get Out Alive =

- Directed by: Clay Dumaw
- Written by: Clay Dumaw
- Produced by: Clay Dumaw
- Starring: David Fichtenmayer; Rhiannon Roberts; David Iannotti; Jay Storey
- Production company: Clay Pigeon Studios
- Release date: September 2013 (Scare-A-Con)
- Running time: 84 minutes
- Country: United States
- Language: English

Get Out Alive is a 2013 American Horror/Thriller film directed by Clay Dumaw. The movie's plot pays tribute to elements from 70s and 80s horror films like The Texas Chain Saw Massacre and The Evil Dead.

== Synopsis ==
While returning from a vacation, siblings, Paul (David Fichtenmayer) and Marilyn (Rhiannon Roberts), fall prey to a pair of homicidal mechanics and their bloodthirsty pet monster.

== Cast ==
- David Fichtenmayer as Paul
- Rhiannon Roberts as Marilyn
- David Iannotti as The Mechanic
- Jay Storey as Earl

== Reception ==
The film received an Official Selection at the 2013 Scare-a-Con Film Festival, and won Best Music.
