= Lake Bonaparte (New York) =

Lake in Lewis County, New York, United States

- Location within New York Location within the United States
- Location: Lewis County, New York
- Coordinates: 44.151°N 75.393°W
- Primary inflows: Mud Lake, Clark Creek
- Primary outflows: Dobson Creek
- Basin countries: United States
- Surface area: 1,286 acres (5.20 km^{2})
- Average depth: 31 feet (9.4 m)
- Max. depth: 75 feet (23 m)
- Shore length^{1}: 9.4 miles (15.1 km)
- Surface elevation: 768 feet (234 m)
- Islands: Round Island, Birch Island, Rock Island, Sister Islands
- ^{1} Shore length is not a well-defined measure.

Lake Bonaparte is located in Lewis County, New York named after Joseph Bonaparte of the House of Bonaparte. The lake has many different species of fish, and is stocked regularly by the NYSDEC.

== Fishing ==
The lake is good for both ice fishing and summer fishing. The most commonly targeted are northern pike, largemouth bass or panfish. There are many fish species in the lake such as lake trout, smallmouth bass, northern pike, brown trout, yellow perch, landlocked salmon, walleye, rainbow trout, rock bass, black crappie, and cisco. Northern pike up to 25", and large or smallmouth bass up to 18" are caught in the lake often. 2,800 brown trout and 800 lake trout are stocked annually in the lake.
