= New York State Route 3 =

Major east–west state highway in New York, US

New York State Route 3
- Map of northern New York with NY 3 highlighted in red

Route information
- Maintained by NYSDOT and the cities of Watertown and Plattsburgh
- Length: 245.88 mi (395.71 km)
- Existed: 1924–present
- Tourist routes: Great Lakes Seaway Trail

Major junctions
- West end: NY 104A in Sterling
- NY 481 in Fulton; NY 104 in Mexico; I-81 in Watertown; NY 86 in Saranac Lake; I-87 in Plattsburgh
- East end: US 9 in Plattsburgh

Location
- Country: United States
- State: New York
- Counties: Cayuga, Oswego, Jefferson, Lewis, St. Lawrence, Essex, Franklin, Clinton

Highway system
- New York Highways; Interstate; US; State; Reference; Parkways
← NY 2	→ NY 3A

New York State Route 3 (NY 3) is a major east–west state highway in New York, in the United States, that connects central New York to the North Country region near the Canada–US border via Adirondack Park. The route extends for 245.88 miles (395.71 km) between its western terminus at an intersection with NY 104A in the Cayuga County town of Sterling and its eastern terminus at a junction with U.S. Route 9 (US 9) in the Clinton County city of Plattsburgh. NY 3 traverses eight counties and is a lakeside roadway from Mexico to Sackets Harbor, a mountainous route in Adirondack Park, and an urban arterial in Fulton, Watertown, and Plattsburgh.

In 1924, the segment of the Theodore Roosevelt International Highway within New York was designated NY 3. At that time, it spanned the full east–west length of the state, extending from the eastern bank of the Niagara River in North Tonawanda to the western edge of Lake Champlain in Plattsburgh; however, the routing through the North Country was significantly different at that time from its modern alignment. The route was moved onto its modern routing east of Watertown as part of the 1930 renumbering of state highways in New York; it was truncated to Sterling on its western end and rerouted to follow its current alignment from Sterling to Watertown roughly five years later.

Since 1924, there have been 14 suffixed routes of NY 3, all designated between NY 3A and NY 3G. Of these, all but one only existed during the 1930s. The only active designation is NY 3A, which was assigned in the 1950s to an alternate route of NY 3 in Jefferson County.

== Route description ==
A substantial portion of NY 3 travels east–west across northern New York and passes through the northern part of the Adirondack Mountain Range. Much of this section of the highway is named as part of the Olympic Trail Scenic Byway.

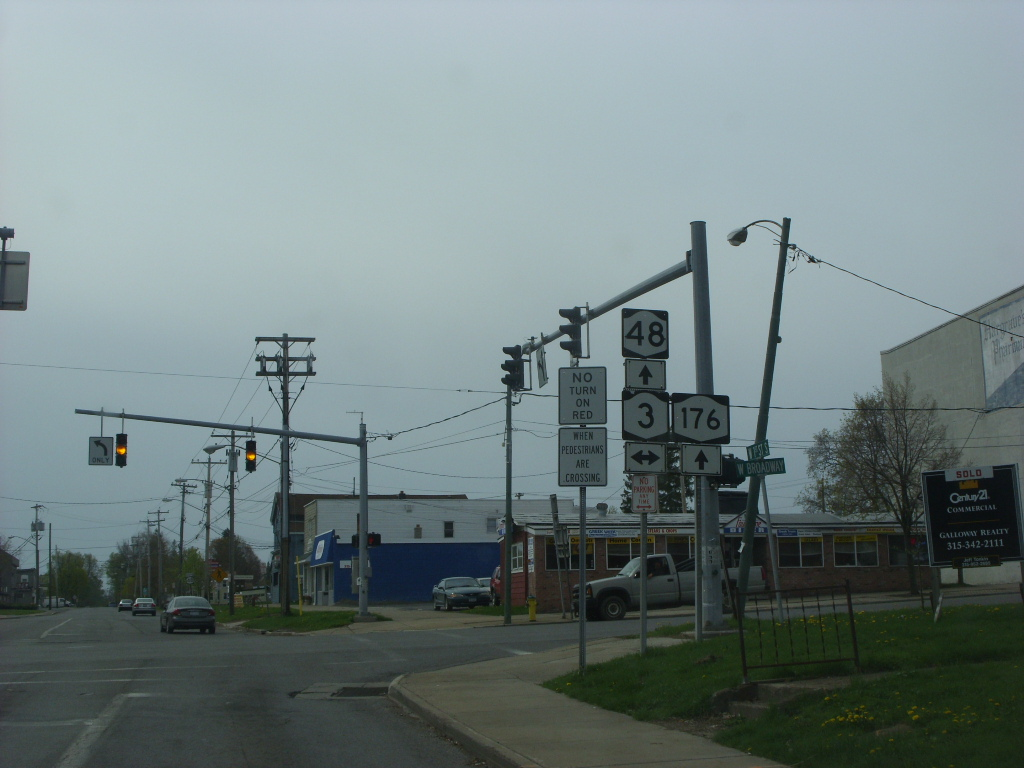
Junction of NY 3 and NY 48 in Fulton

The areas NY 3 passes through alternate between long stretches of rural area, consisting of a mix of open terrain and dispersed residences, and compact settlements containing concentrations of houses and businesses. NY 3 is classified mainly as a minor arterial road, the major exception being the section that is concurrent with NY 812, which is a principal arterial road. Most of the route is maintained by the New York State Department of Transportation. Exceptions are in the cities of Watertown and Plattsburgh, where at least part of the road is city-maintained. In Watertown, NY 3 is locally maintained from Massey Street (southbound US 11 junction) to the end of the NY 3/NY 12 overlap. The route is entirely city-maintained in Plattsburgh.

=== Sterling to Watertown ===
NY 3 begins at an intersection with NY 104A in Sterling. NY 3 continues east to meet NY 104 in the center of Hannibal. From there, NY 3 progresses across Oswego County and passes Lake Neatahwanta prior to entering Fulton. Within Fulton, NY 3 intersects NY 48 on the west bank of the Oswego River before crossing the river and meeting NY 481 at the eastern bank. East of the city, NY 3 passes south of the Oswego County Airport as it heads to the northeast through Palermo. Upon intersecting NY 264, NY 3 becomes signed as a north–south highway instead of as an east–west route. It proceeds north to the village of Mexico, where it meets NY 104 once again. NY 3 and NY 104 overlap briefly through the western portion of the village before separating at the center of Mexico. While NY 104 heads east toward Williamstown, NY 3 heads north toward the hamlet of Texas.

East of Texas, NY 3 meets NY 104B near the Lake Ontario shoreline. Past NY 104B, NY 3 parallels both Interstate 81 (I-81) and US 11 as it heads along the shore of Lake Ontario. Near the Selkirk Shores State Park west of Pulaski, NY 3 intersects NY 13 adjacent to the mouth of the Salmon River. After crossing the Salmon River, NY 3 passes the Sandy Island Beach State Park before entering Jefferson County. At the county line, NY 3 becomes signed as an east–west highway once again. The route continues northward toward Ellisburg where it meets NY 193 at the entrance to Southwick Beach State Park northwest of the community. Past NY 193, NY 3 passes the lakeside at Westcott Beach State Park prior to entering the vicinity of Sackets Harbor. The route bypasses both Sackets Harbor and the Sackets Harbor Battlefield State Historic Site to the east before separating from Lake Ontario and proceeding eastward toward Watertown.

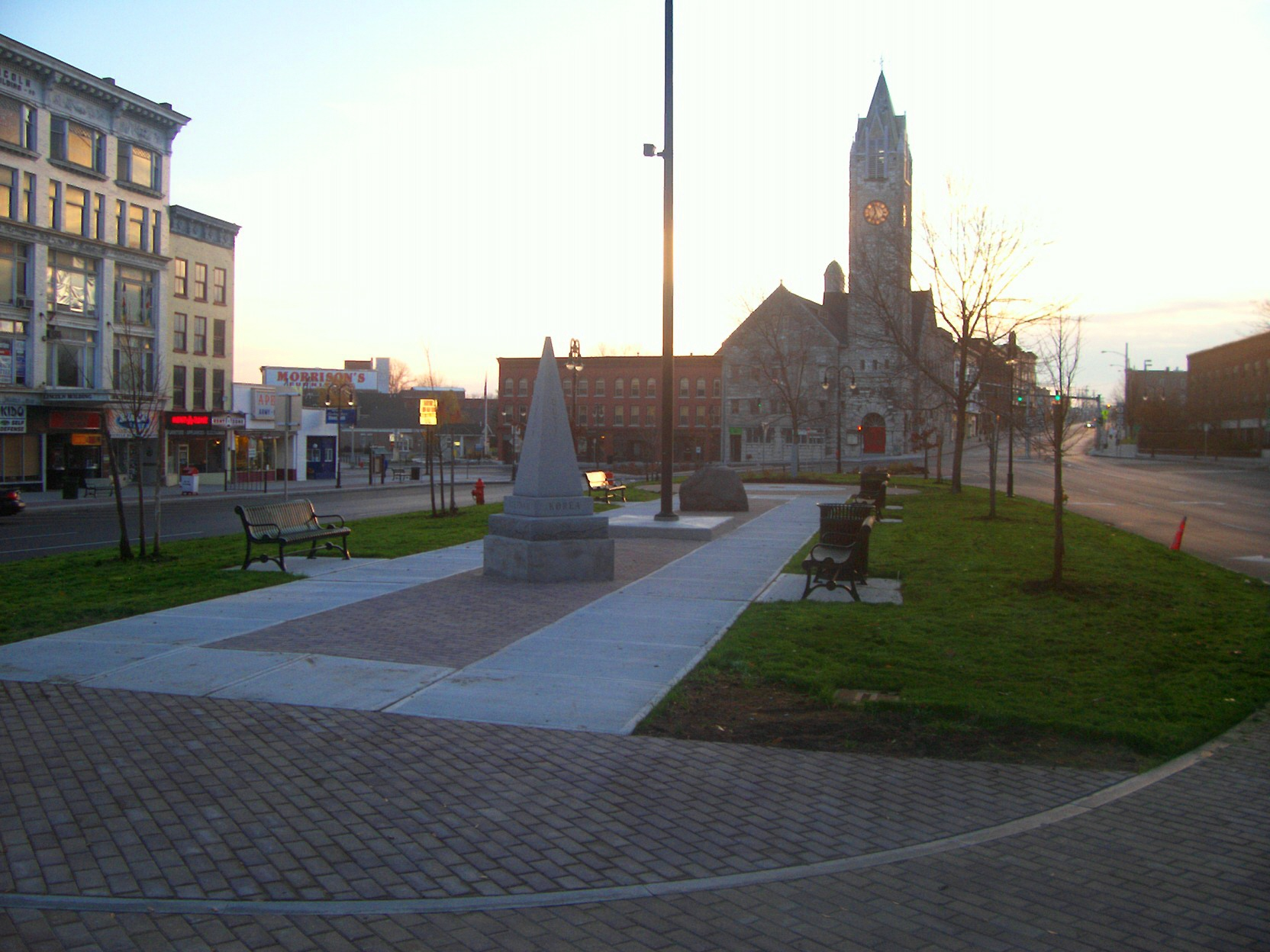
Watertown's Public Square, encircled by NY 3

West of the city of Watertown, NY 3 intersects NY 180 southwest of the Watertown International Airport before connecting to I-81 by way of an interchange at the city line. NY 3 heads east into Watertown, intersecting with both US 11 and NY 12 at Massey Street. At this point, maintenance of NY 3 shifts from the state to the city of Watertown. The route overlaps NY 12 southbound and a short piece of US 11 northbound through downtown to Public Square, where NY 3 meets northbound NY 12. US 11 northbound leaves NY 3 here while the overlap between NY 3 and NY 12 continues eastward through Watertown. The concurrency ends near the eastern fringe of the city, where NY 3 leaves NY 12 and becomes state-maintained once more as it departs the city to the northeast.

=== Watertown to Plattsburgh ===
In Black River, northeast of Watertown, NY 3 intersects NY 342 at the southwestern tip of the Fort Drum Military Reservation. NY 3 follows the southern edge of the base to Deferiet, where NY 3 turns south to follow the Black River while NY 3A continues along the border of Fort Drum. NY 3 follows the river to Carthage, where it overlaps NY 126 briefly before heading northeast to rejoin NY 3A at Fargo. NY 3 forms the southern boundary of the base from NY 3A east to just west of the Jefferson-Lewis County line; however, near Natural Bridge, the Fort Drum boundary heads due north before becoming delimited by the Indian River. NY 3, meanwhile, traverses the river and enters Lewis County.

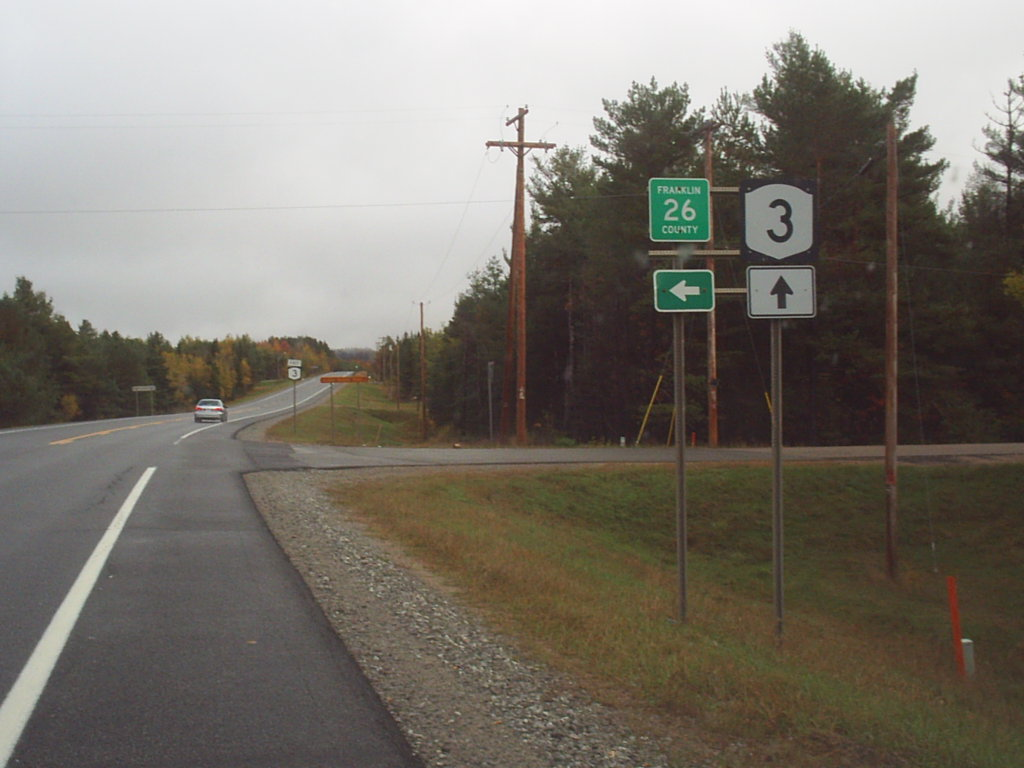
NY 3 eastbound at Franklin CR 26 (former NY 99) in the town of Franklin

Midway between Natural Bridge and Harrisville, NY 3 intersects NY 812. NY 812 turns east onto NY 3, following NY 3 northeast into St. Lawrence County before splitting to the northwest between Harrisville and Pitcairn. Shortly after departing NY 812, NY 3 enters Adirondack Park. The route follows a largely east–west routing from its entry point to Tupper Lake, where it merges with NY 30. Near Upper Saranac Lake, NY 30 heads north toward Malone as NY 3 continues northeast through nearby Saranac Lake toward Plattsburgh.

West of Plattsburgh, NY 3 exits the park and encounters NY 374 via an interchange. Past the exit, the two routes follow parallel routings before separating outside of Plattsburgh. NY 3 curves to the southeast toward the former Clinton County Airport, where it meets NY 22B just west of what was once the main entrance to the airport. From NY 22B, NY 3 continues east to the outskirts of Plattsburgh, where it meets the Adirondack Northway (I-87). Past I-87, NY 3 follows Cornelia Street into the city, where it becomes city-maintained. Within Plattsburgh, NY 3 intersects NY 22 before terminating at US 9 just west of Lake Champlain.

== History ==
=== Original alignment ===
NY 3 originally followed a vastly different alignment than it does today. In 1924, it was assigned to the New York portion of the Theodore Roosevelt International Highway, an auto trail that extended from Portland, Maine, to Portland, Oregon. In New York, it connected North Tonawanda (near Niagara Falls) in the west to Plattsburgh in the east via Rochester and Watertown. NY 3 began at what is now the intersection of US 62 and NY 425 and followed modern NY 425 north through Cambria Station to Cambria Center, from where the highway continued to Lockport on Lower Mountain, Gothic Hill, and Upper Mountain Roads and modern NY 31. It remained on current NY 31 through the city and mostly followed that route's modern alignment across western New York to the city of Rochester. The most significant exception to this was between Lockport and Gasport, where NY 3 veered south by way of modern NY 77 and County Route 10 (CR 10) to serve the hamlet of McNalls.

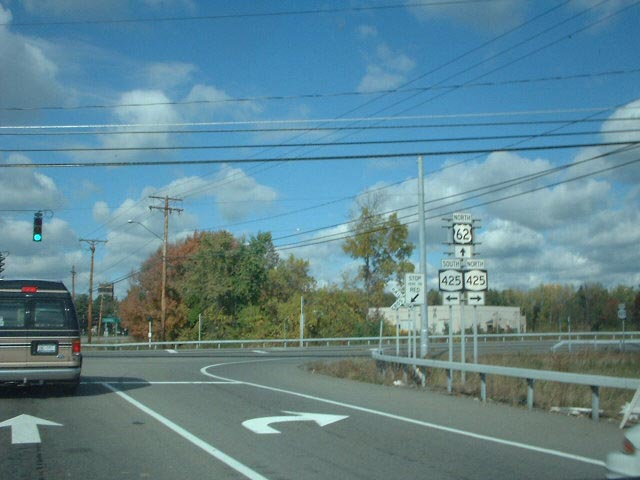
The original western terminus of NY 3 near North Tonawanda. When it was first assigned, NY 3 left this junction on modern NY 425 northbound (right).

Within Rochester, NY 3 remained on the current alignment of NY 31 to what is now the intersection of Lyell Avenue and Broad Street. Here, NY 3 broke from modern NY 31 and continued east on Lyell Avenue to State Street. NY 3 then followed State Street, Main Street, and East Avenue (modern NY 96) through downtown before turning north onto Culver Road in the eastern portion of the city. The route remained on Culver Road to Empire Boulevard, where it turned east toward Irondequoit. Once in Irondequoit, it followed what is now NY 404 around the southern extent of Irondequoit Bay to Webster. NY 3 was realigned by 1930 to stay on East Avenue to Winton Road near the eastern edge of the city. Here, the route turned north, following Winton Road through eastern Rochester to Irondequoit, where it rejoined its previous routing at Empire Boulevard.

Past Webster, NY 3 followed Ridge Road through Wayne County to Red Creek, where it continued northeast on what is now NY 370 and NY 104A through Red Creek, Fair Haven, and Sterling to western Oswego County. At Southwest Oswego, NY 3 joined the routing of modern NY 104 through Oswego and Mexico to Maple View. Between Maple View and Watertown, NY 3 overlapped NY 2 along what is now US 11. Past Watertown, NY 3 was routed along today's NY 12F and NY 180 to Limerick, where it continued north to Clayton by way of modern NY 12E. East of Clayton, it followed modern NY 12, NY 26 and CR 192 through Alexandria Bay to Redwood. From there, it utilized the current alignment of NY 37 up through Ogdensburg (by way of Main and Ford Streets in the city) before continuing to Waddington on Van Rensselaer Road. NY 3 went east from here along a now-dismantled riverside highway and Town Line Road to Massena, where it was routed on modern NY 37B.

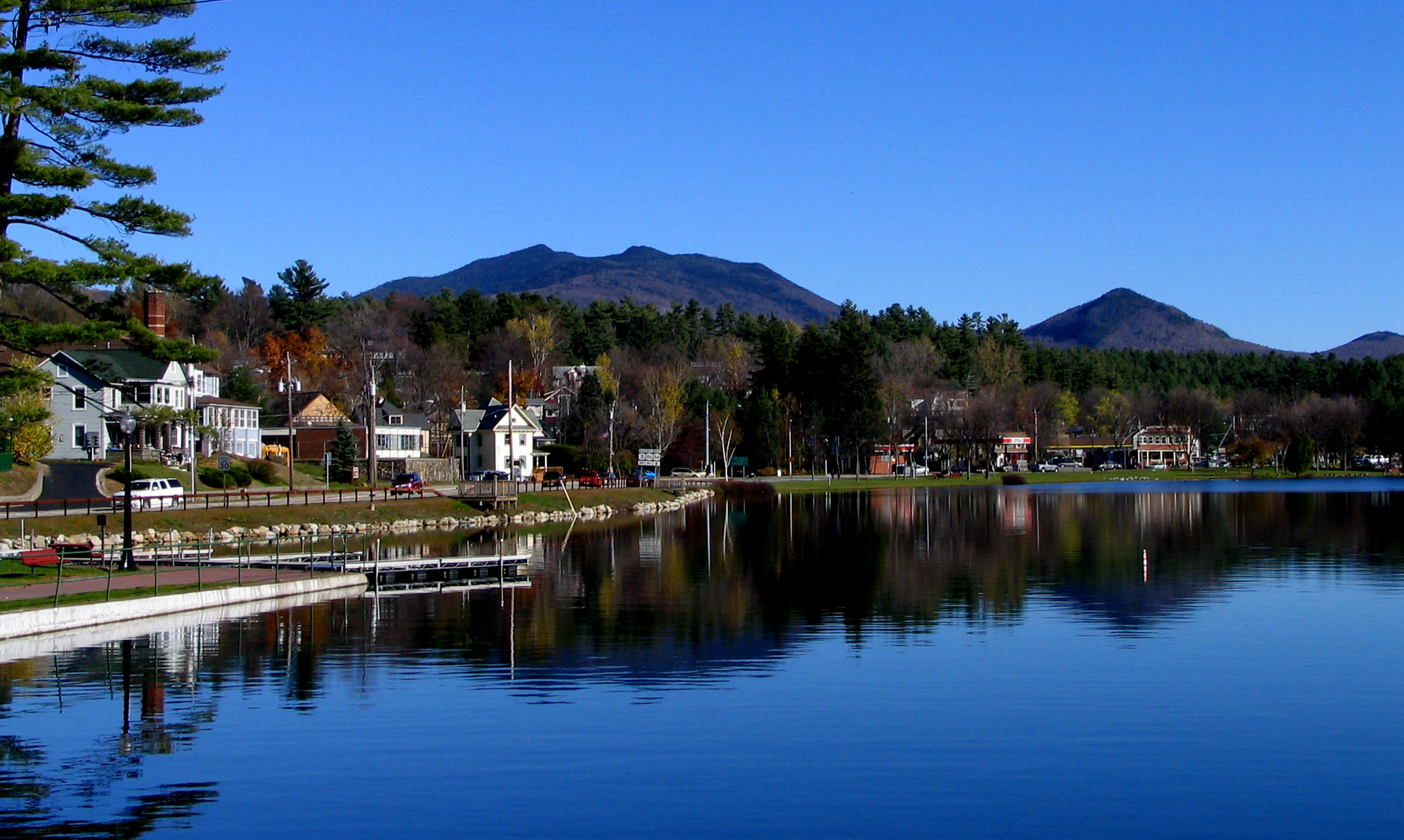
Lake Flower in Saranac Lake, with NY 3 and NY 86 routed along the lakeshore

East of Massena, NY 3 followed a series of local roads that parallel the modern divided highway section of NY 37 to Rooseveltown, at which point it rejoined current NY 37. The highway remained on today's NY 37 up to CR 51 northwest of Malone, where NY 3 continued south on CR 51 to modern US 11 (then NY 2) west of the village. After briefly overlapping NY 2 (current US 11) into Malone, NY 3 turned south onto what is now NY 30, following the route to Paul Smiths. Past Paul Smiths, NY 3 continued east along the length of modern NY 86 to Jay, overlapping then-NY 10 from Harrietstown to Saranac Lake in between. Lastly, from Jay to Plattsburgh, NY 3 overlapped then-NY 6 along what is now NY 9N and US 9.

=== Early realignments ===
In the late 1920s, NY 3 was rerouted near Malone to follow modern NY 37 into the village, largely eliminating the overlap with US 11. Additionally, NY 3 was truncated to Jay on its eastern end. The former alignment to Plattsburgh became part of NY 9W from Jay to Keeseville and US 9 from Keeseville to Plattsburgh. A more substantial realignment of NY 3 took place as part of the 1930 renumbering of state highways in New York. NY 3 now began concurrent with NY 31A at then-NY 18 (now NY 104) in Niagara Falls. The routes proceeded eastward along modern NY 31 to Sanborn, where NY 31A turned north to follow what is now NY 429 back to then-NY 31. NY 3 continued on current NY 31 for another two miles to Shawnee, where it met its original alignment to North Tonawanda, which became part of NY 425 in the renumbering. At this point, NY 3 rejoined its previous alignment, overlapping NY 425 up to Cambria–Wilson Road, where that route split off and continued to the north.

NY 3 was realigned in two locations between Lockport and Rochester. One was just east of Lockport, where it was straightened out to go directly from Lockport to Gasport on modern NY 31, bypassing McNalls. The other was between Middleport and Medina, where it was realigned to use modern NY 31E instead. NY 3's old alignment from Lockport to Gasport via McNalls became part of NY 77 west of McNalls and NY 359 north of the community. Its former routing between Middleport and Medina became NY 3A.

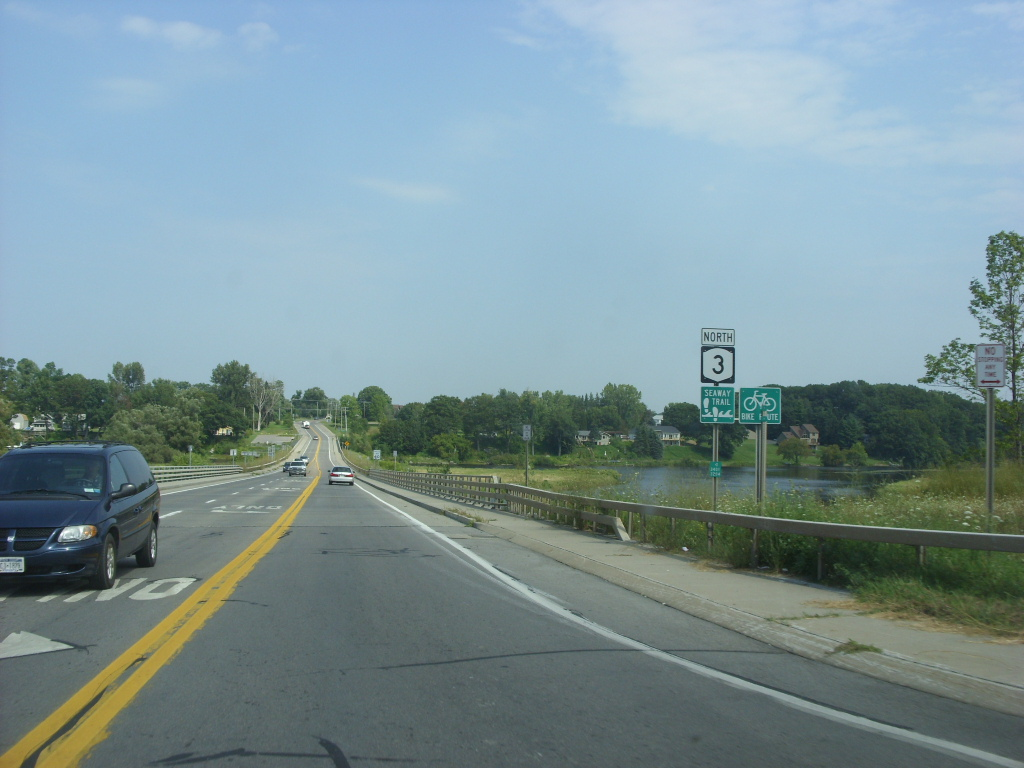
Northbound on NY 3 west of Pulaski

The most significant realignment that occurred at this time was in the North Country, where NY 3 was shifted onto its current alignment between Watertown and Plattsburgh. From Tupper Lake east to Plattsburgh, most of what became NY 3 was previously part of NY 10. The NY 10 designation remained in place from Tupper Lake east to Upper Saranac Lake, forming an overlap with NY 3; however, it was completely replaced by NY 3 from Saranac Lake east. Between Upper Saranac Lake and Saranac Lake, the routing of NY 3 was previously unnumbered, as was the routing from Watertown to Tupper Lake.

=== Spur routes and US 104 ===
At least four suffixed routes of NY 3 were created as part of the 1930 renumbering. The longest of the four initial routes was New York State Route 3C, an alternate route of NY 3 that generally followed NY 3's current alignment between Sterling and Watertown. Another was assigned c. 1931 when NY 3 was rerouted between Deferiet and Wilna to bypass Carthage to the north on modern NY 3A. The portion of NY 3's former routing from Deferiet to Carthage became NY 3F. NY 3 was shifted southward onto modern NY 31 between Shawnee and Lockport c. 1932. The realignment eliminated overlaps with NY 425 and NY 93, the latter of which had used NY 3's former routing east of Cambria–Wilson Road since it was assigned as part of the 1930 renumbering. Even though all of the former routing had a designation, it was also designated as NY 3A anyway. As a result, the designations of all of NY 3's spur routes were increased by one letter, meaning the existing NY 3A became NY 3B, NY 3C became New York State Route 3D, and so forth.

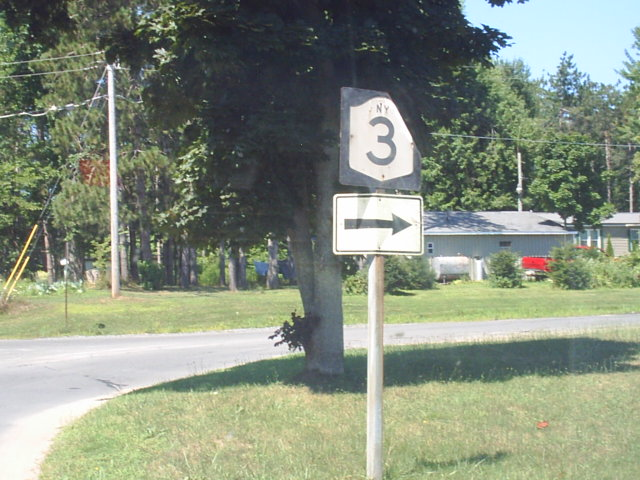
An old assembly for NY 3 on Oswego CR 3 near Hannibal

US 104 was assigned c. 1935, extending from Niagara Falls to Maple View mostly by way of then-NY 31 west of Rochester and NY 3 from Rochester to Maple View. As a result, NY 31 was shifted southward onto the alignment of NY 3 from Niagara Falls to Rochester while NY 3 was realigned south of Watertown to follow the routing of NY 3D to a new terminus in Sterling. Every spur route of NY 3 was eliminated at this time except for NY 3G. The alignments of NY 3 and NY 3G between Deferiet and Wilna were flipped c. 1938.

=== Other alignment changes ===
At some point between 1935 and 1938, NY 3 was truncated further to end at its junction with US 104 in Hannibal. It was moved another half-mile (0.8 km) to the east in the early 1960s following the completion of the super two bypass carrying US 104 around the eastern edge of the village. NY 3 continued to end at the super two until the early 1980s. On April 1, 1980, ownership and maintenance of NY 3's former routing between the Cayuga County line and NY 104 was transferred from Oswego County to the state of New York. One year later, on April 1, 1981, the state assumed ownership and maintenance of the Cayuga County portion from that county. Both transactions were part of larger highway maintenance swaps between the state and the two counties. NY 3 was reextended westward to NY 104A following the second swap.

From Sandy Creek to Henderson, NY 3C (later NY 3D) was routed on Weaver Road, CR 121, NY 193, CR 78, NY 178, and CR 123. A new lakeside highway between Sandy Creek and the modern junction of NY 3 and NY 193 was opened to traffic c. 1932 as a realignment of NY 3D. An extension of the roadway north to Henderson was completed by the following year. To the southwest in Oswego County, NY 3 was originally routed on modern CR 3 between Hannibal and Fulton and on Hannibal and Oneida Streets through the city of Fulton. The modern arterial through the city was constructed c. 1962 while the Hannibal–Fulton highway was built in the mid-1960s.

== Suffixed routes ==
NY 3 has had 14 suffixed routes over the years; however, all of them except for one only existed during the 1930s. The only active designation is NY 3A, which is currently assigned to an alternate route of NY 3 in Jefferson County.

=== Original routes ===
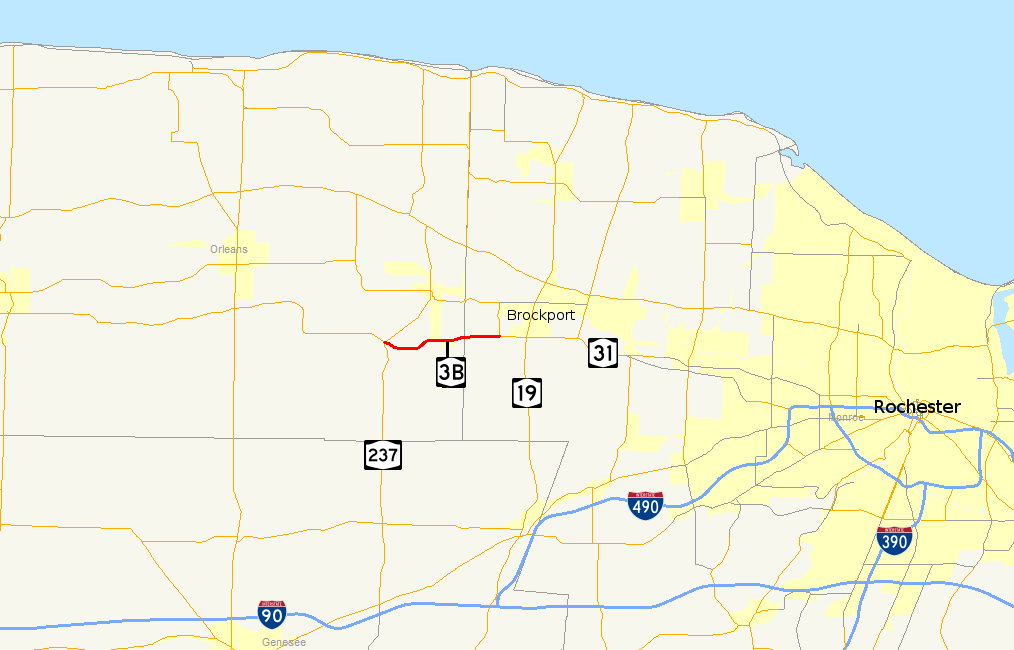
Map of the original NY 3B

At least four suffixed routes of NY 3 were created as part of the 1930 renumbering of state highways in New York. Two more were assigned by the following year. All of these were renumbered c. 1932.

- NY 3A was an alternate route of NY 3 between Middleport and Medina. It became the western half of NY 3B.
- NY 3B was a connector between NY 237 in Clarendon and NY 3 south of Brockport. The portion of the route within Monroe County was renumbered to NY 3C.
- NY 3C was an alternate route of NY 3 between Sterling and Watertown. It was renumbered to NY 3D.
- NY 3D was a connector between NY 3 in New Haven and NY 3C in the town of Mexico. It was assigned by 1931 and renumbered to NY 3E.
- NY 3E was an alternate route of NY 3 between Red Creek and Southwest Oswego. It was renumbered to NY 3F.
- NY 3F was assigned c. 1931 as a connector between Deferiet and Carthage. It was renumbered to NY 3G.

=== Post-1932 routes ===
All the routes below except for the current NY 3A were assigned c. 1932.

- NY 3A has been assigned two times since 1932:
  - The second NY 3A was an alternate route of NY 3 west of Lockport along modern NY 425 and Lower Mountain, Gothic Hill, and Upper Mountain Roads (the latter three then also part of NY 93). The designation was removed c. 1935, leaving NY 425 and NY 93 as the sole routes on the alignment.
  - The current NY 3A (5.19 miles or 8.35 kilometres) is an alternate route of NY 3 east of the city of Watertown. While NY 3 dips south between Deferiet and Fargo to serve Carthage, NY 3A is a direct east–west route between the two communities. It was assigned in the early 1950s.
- NY 3B was an alternate route of NY 3 between Middleport and Knowlesville. It was renumbered to NY 31A c. 1935.
- NY 3C was a spur leading from NY 3 south of Brockport to the Orleans County line. It was renumbered to NY 31D c. 1935.
- NY 3D was an alternate route of NY 3 between Sterling and Watertown. It became a realignment of NY 3 c. 1935.
- NY 3E was a connector between NY 3 in New Haven and NY 3D in the town of Mexico. It was renumbered to NY 104B c. 1935.
- NY 3F was an alternate route of NY 3 between Red Creek and Southwest Oswego. It became part of the new US 104 c. 1935.
- NY 3G was initially a connector between Deferiet and Carthage; it was later reassigned to a northerly alternate route of NY 3 between Deferiet and Fargo. The designation was removed in the mid-1940s.

== Major intersections ==
County	Location	mi	km	Destinations	Notes
Cayuga	Sterling	0.00	0.00	NY 104A – Fair Haven, Oswego	Western terminus; hamlet of Crocketts
Oswego	Village of Hannibal	3.41	5.49	NY 104 – Oswego, Rochester	
Oswego	Fulton	11.39	18.33	NY 48	
Oswego	Fulton	11.43– 11.59	18.39– 18.65	Bridge over the Oswego River	
Oswego	Fulton	11.73	18.88	NY 481	
Oswego	Palermo	16.74	26.94	NY 49 east – Central Square	Western terminus of NY 49
Oswego	Palermo	19.45	31.30	NY 264 south – Syracuse	Northern terminus of NY 264
Oswego	Village of Mexico	27.70	44.58	NY 104 west – Oswego	Western terminus of concurrency with NY 104
Oswego	Village of Mexico	27.96	45.00	NY 104 east – Camden	Eastern terminus of concurrency with NY 104
Oswego	Town of Mexico	31.85	51.26	NY 104B west / Great Lakes Seaway Trail – Oswego	Eastern terminus of NY 104B
Oswego	Richland	36.10	58.10	NY 13 south – Pulaski	Northern terminus of NY 13; hamlet of Port Ontario
Oswego	Richland	36.13– 36.38	58.15– 58.55	Bridge over the Salmon River	
Jefferson	Ellisburg	51.43	82.77	NY 193 east – Ellisburg	Western terminus of NY 193
Jefferson	Henderson	57.09	91.88	NY 178 east to I-81 – Adams	Western terminus of NY 178
Jefferson	Hounsfield	68.46	110.18	NY 180 north / Great Lakes Seaway Trail – Dexter, Cape Vincent	Southern terminus of NY 180
Jefferson	Town of Watertown	74.06	119.19	I-81 – Syracuse, Canada	Exit 156 on I-81; partial cloverleaf interchange
Jefferson	City of Watertown	75.64	121.73	US 11 south	
Jefferson	City of Watertown	75.99	122.29	US 11 north	Western terminus of US 11 northbound overlap
Jefferson	City of Watertown	76.06	122.41	US 11 north	Eastern terminus of US 11 northbound overlap
Jefferson	City of Watertown	76.15	122.55	NY 12 north	Western terminus of NY 12 overlap
Jefferson	City of Watertown	77.51	124.74	NY 12 south to NY 126	Eastern terminus of concurrency with NY 12
Jefferson	Le Ray	81.88	131.77	NY 342 west – Fort Drum	Eastern terminus of NY 342
Jefferson	Rutland	84.60	136.15	NY 971V – Fort Drum	Hamlet of Felts Mills
Jefferson	Champion	87.23	140.38	NY 26 – Fort Drum, Lowville	Hamlet of Great Bend
Jefferson	Deferiet	89.06	143.33	NY 3A east	Western terminus of NY 3A
Jefferson	Carthage	94.80	152.57	NY 126 west	Western terminus of concurrency with NY 126
Jefferson	Carthage	94.87	152.68	NY 126 east	Eastern terminus of concurrency with NY 126
Jefferson	Wilna	98.84	159.07	NY 3A west – Watertown	Eastern terminus of NY 3A; hamlet of Fargo
Lewis	Diana	111.71	179.78	NY 812 south – Croghan	Western terminus of concurrency with NY 812
St. Lawrence	Pitcairn	116.16	186.94	NY 812 north – Gouverneur	Eastern terminus of concurrency with NY 812
St. Lawrence	Fine	127.20	204.71	NY 58 north – Edwards	Southern terminus of NY 58
St. Lawrence	Colton	157.95	254.20	NY 56 north – Potsdam	Southern terminus of NY 56
Franklin	Village of Tupper Lake	175.23	282.01	NY 30 south	Western terminus of concurrency with NY 30
Franklin	Harrietstown	180.77	290.92	NY 30 north – Lake Clear, Paul Smiths, Adirondack Airport	Eastern terminus of concurrency with NY 30
Franklin	Saranac Lake	196.06	315.53	NY 86 west – Paul Smiths, Malone	Southern terminus of concurrency with NY 86
Franklin	Saranac Lake	196.49	316.22	NY 86 east	Northern terminus of concurrency with NY 86
Essex	St. Armand	202.88	326.50	CR 81 west – Paul Smiths, Gabriels	Eastern terminus of CR 81; former eastern terminus of NY 192; hamlet of Bloomingdale
Franklin	Franklin	212.18	341.47	CR 26 west – Malone	Eastern terminus of CR 26; former eastern terminus of NY 99
Clinton	Town of Plattsburgh	237.08	381.54	NY 374 west – Dannemora	Access via NY 970F; hamlet of Cadyville
Clinton	Town of Plattsburgh	237.08	381.54	NY 374 east – Plattsburgh	Partial interchange; eastbound entrance and westbound exit; hamlet of Cadyville
Clinton	Town of Plattsburgh	242.13	389.67	NY 22B south – Morrisonville	Northern terminus of NY 22B
Clinton	Town of Plattsburgh	242.70	390.59	NY 190 west (Military Turnpike)	Eastern terminus of NY 190
Clinton	Town of Plattsburgh	244.05	392.76	I-87 to A-15 – Montreal, Albany	Exit 37 on I-87
Clinton	City of Plattsburgh	245.62	395.29	NY 22 south (North Catherine Street)	One-way southbound
Clinton	City of Plattsburgh	245.75	395.50	NY 22 north (Oak Street)	One-way northbound
Clinton	City of Plattsburgh	245.88	395.71	US 9	Eastern terminus
1.000 mi = 1.609 km; 1.000 km = 0.621 mi: Concurrency terminus; Incomplete access

== See also ==
- List of county routes in Oswego County, New York
