= Harrisville, New York =

- Hamlet and CDP
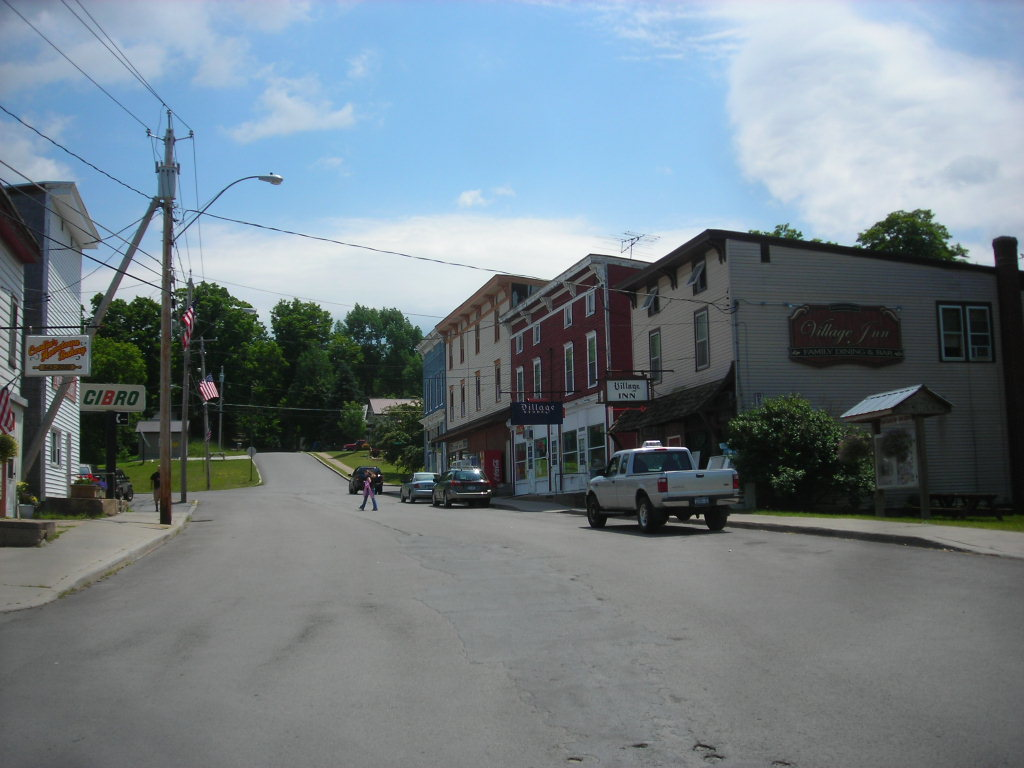

- Location within New York Location within the United States
- Coordinates: 44°9′8″N 75°19′11″W
- Country: United States
- State: New York
- County: Lewis
- Town: Diana

Area
  - Total: 0.83 sq mi (2.15 km^{2})
  - Land: 0.78 sq mi (2.03 km^{2})
  - Water: 0.046 sq mi (0.12 km^{2})
- Elevation: 807 ft (246 m)

Population (2010)
  - Total: 628
  - Estimate (2019): 604
  - Density: 768.9/sq mi (296.87/km^{2})
- Time zone: UTC-5 (Eastern (EST))
  - Summer (DST): UTC-4 (EDT)
- ZIP code: 13648
- Area code: 315
- FIPS code: 36-32424
- GNIS feature ID: 952291

Harrisville is a hamlet and former village in Lewis County, New York, United States. The community is now a census-designated place. The population was 628 at the 2010 census.

Harrisville is in the northeastern part of the town of Diana and is south of Gouverneur.

On May 15, 2018, residents voted to dissolve the village by a vote of 112–70, and it took effect on December 31, 2018. As of the 2019 American Community Survey, the U.S. Census Bureau still lists Harrisville as a village.

== History ==
In 1815, Joseph Bonaparte, elder brother of Napoleon I and former King of Spain, purchased a tract of land from James Le Ray, part of which became the town of Diana. Harrisville, the largest community in the town, takes its name from Foskit Harris, who settled there in 1833. Harris constructed a sawmill and gristmill, harnessing the West Branch of the Oswegatchie River for power to operate the mills. When early settlers discovered that the landlord John LaFarge, from whom La Fargeville, New York, takes its name, had acquired title to Bonaparte's land, they abandoned the area, and Harrisville languished for 20 years.

In 1859, Samuel H. Beach and William R. Dodge built a massive tannery on the east side of the river. The 228-foot-long (69 m) structure had 160 vats and was capable of turning out 40,000 sides of sole leather per year. In 1879, David Botchford and Co. acquired the tannery, which closed in 1902.

By 1880 Harrisville had become the commercial and industrial center of the town of Diana. The abundant natural resource of forests and water shaped industrial development and served to attract investors and residents supported by a chair factory, a sash and door factory, and several active lumber dealers. In addition, carriage makers, blacksmiths, a harness shop, and numerous general merchandise stores and retail service establishments such as barbershops and hotels supported community development.

The Carthage & Adirondack Railroad came to Harrisville in 1887, replacing the earlier, unsuccessful Black River & St. Lawrence Railroad, which had relied on maple rails to support heavy locomotives. The Carthage & Adirondack transported leather, lumber, and paper from Harrisville mills. As a common carrier, the railroad also brought visitors to Lake Bonaparte and other vacation spots in the northern Adirondacks. The depot is now home to the Town of Diana Historical Museum.

Around 1905, the Diana Paper Company built a mill on the Botchford Tannery's former location. The mill primarily produced paper for magazines and catalogs. During World War I, the company experienced financial difficulty because of unfavorable wood contracts. After years of struggle, the company filed for bankruptcy in 1927. St. Regis Paper Company acquired the mill and ran it until 1954, when the Harrisville Paper Company bought it. The mill ceased operations in 1957.

== Geography ==
Harrisville is located in the northern part of the town of Diana, along the northern boundary of Lewis County at 44°09′08″N 75°19′11″W. It is bordered to the north by the town of Pitcairn in St. Lawrence County.

According to the United States Census Bureau, in 2010 the village had a total area of 0.83 square miles (2.15 km^{2}), of which 0.78 square miles (2.03 km^{2}) were land and 0.05 square miles (0.12 km^{2}), or 5.56%, are water.

Combined New York State Route 812 and New York State Route 3 pass through the community. Route 3 leads east 60 miles (97 km) to Tupper Lake and west 34 miles (55 km) to Watertown, while Route 812 leads south 30 miles (48 km) to Lowville, the Lewis county seat, and north toward Gouverneur, 16 miles (26 km) away. County Road 9 enters Harrisville from the south.

Harrisville is on the West Branch of the Oswegatchie River, which flows north to the St. Lawrence River at Ogdensburg.

== Demographics ==
Historical population
Census	Pop.	Note	%±
1880	353		—
1890	617		74.8%
1900	639		3.6%
1910	921		44.1%
1920	900		−2.3%
1930	896		−0.4%
1940	832		−7.1%
1950	868		4.3%
1960	842		−3.0%
1970	836		−0.7%
1980	937		12.1%
1990	703		−25.0%
2000	653		−7.1%
2010	628		−3.8%
2019 (est.)	604		−3.8%
U.S. Decennial Census

As of the census of 2000, there were 653 people, 266 households, and 172 families residing in the village. The population density was 849.6 inhabitants per square mile (328.0/km^{2}). There were 299 housing units at an average density of 389.0 per square mile (150.2/km^{2}). The racial makeup of the village was 98.93% White, 0.15% Native American, 0.31% Asian, and 0.61% from two or more races.

There were 266 households, out of which 28.6% had children under the age of 18 living with them, 53.8% were married couples living together, 7.1% had a female householder with no husband present, and 35.0% were non-families. 28.9% of all households were made up of individuals, and 18.0% had someone living alone who was 65 years of age or older. The average household size was 2.45 and the average family size was 3.06.

In the village, the population was spread out, with 25.1% under the age of 18, 9.5% from 18 to 24, 25.0% from 25 to 44, 24.3% from 45 to 64, and 16.1% who were 65 years of age or older. The median age was 40 years. For every 100 females, there were 86.6 males. For every 100 females age 18 and over, there were 89.5 males. The median income for a household in the village was $30,833, and the median income for a family was $32,946. Males had a median income of $32,417 versus $19,545 for females. The per capita income for the village was $15,652. About 12.6% of families and 16.1% of the population were below the poverty line, including 21.2% of those under age 18 and 12.7% of those age 65 or over.

== Education ==
It is in the Harrisville Central School District.
