= Carthage, New York =

- Village
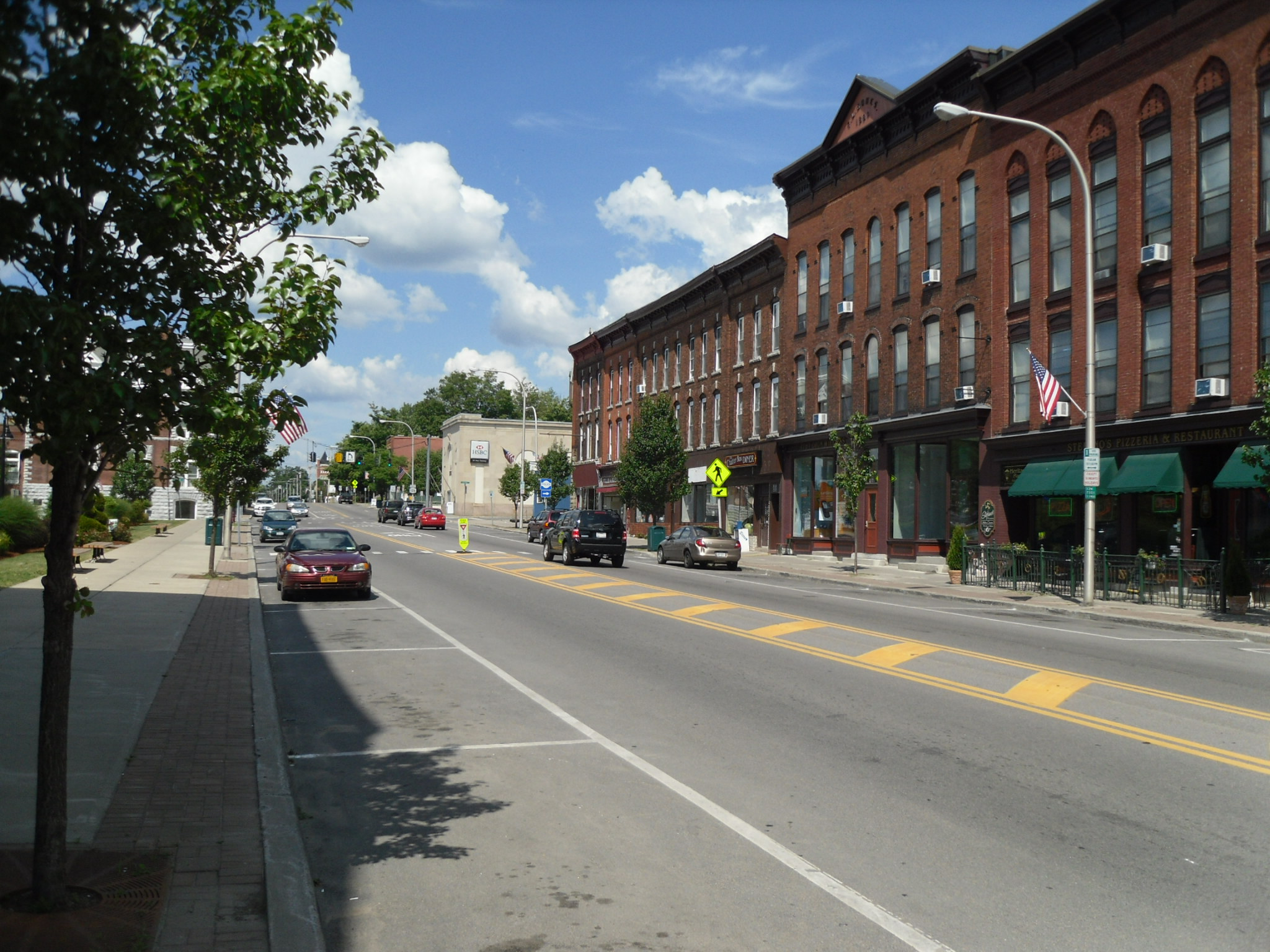
- Downtown Carthage

- Location within New York Location within the United States
- Coordinates: 43°58′52″N 75°36′25″W
- Country: United States
- State: New York
- County: Jefferson
- Town: Wilna

Area
  - Total: 2.59 sq mi (6.71 km^{2})
  - Land: 2.42 sq mi (6.28 km^{2})
  - Water: 0.16 sq mi (0.42 km^{2})
- Elevation: 768 ft (234 m)

Population (2020)
  - Total: 3,236
  - Density: 1,334.3/sq mi (515.16/km^{2})
- Time zone: UTC-5 (Eastern (EST))
  - Summer (DST): UTC-4 (EDT)
- ZIP code: 13619
- Area code: 315
- FIPS code: 36-12683
- GNIS feature ID: 0969965
- Website: villageofcarthageny.gov

Carthage is a village in the town of Wilna in Jefferson County, New York, United States. The population was 3,236 at the 2020 census. The village of Carthage is along the southern border of the town of Wilna and is east of Watertown.

== History ==
The original settlement was called "Long Falls" and was settled around 1798.

Perspective map of Carthage and list of landmarks from 1888 by L.R. Burleigh

The village was chartered in 1869. It is one of only twelve villages in New York still incorporated under a charter, the others having incorporated or re-incorporated under the provisions of Village Law. The village is named after the historic city of Carthage in what is now Tunisia.

In 1861, a major fire destroyed about twenty buildings in the village, and a smaller fire at the end of the year destroyed more property. A less destructive fire occurred in 1872. Another large fire in 1884 that spread across the river from West Carthage ruined more than 150 buildings. The First Baptist Church and Cook Memorial Building, State Street Historic District, and United States Post Office are listed on the National Register of Historic Places. In 2002, another fire destroyed eight buildings in the downtown area, displacing nearly 150 residents and leaving a pile of ruin.

== Notable people ==
- Carla Balenda, film and television actress, born in Carthage in 1925
- Fletcher Brothers, fundamentalist preacher
- John Carpenter, film director, screenwriter, and producer
- Clay Dumaw, film director, screenwriter and producer. He is best known for his work on Hold 'em, Get Out Alive and Jack Wyatt and the Gun from Hell
- Tom Homan, White House executive associate director of enforcement and removal operations under President Trump’s second term
- Casey Powell, Ryan Powell, and Mikey Powell, All-American lacrosse players at Syracuse University and professional Major League Lacrosse players (born in West Carthage, New York)
- Dave Trembley, Major League Baseball coach, manager and executive
- Edward J. Westcott, Adjutant General of New York

== Geography ==
Carthage is located in eastern Jefferson County at 43°58′52″N 75°36′25″W (43.981118, -75.606849). Its southwestern border is the Black River, which is in part the border with the town of Champion and the village of West Carthage in Jefferson County, and in part the border with the town of Denmark in Lewis County. The village is 2 miles (3 km) south of the southern border of Fort Drum.

According to the United States Census Bureau, the village has a total area of 2.7 square miles (6.9 km^{2}), of which 2.5 square miles (6.5 km^{2}) are land and 0.2 square miles (0.4 km^{2}), or 6.35%, are water.

The village is located at the junction of New York State Routes 3 and 126. NY-3 leads west 18 miles (29 km) to Watertown, following the Black River, and northeast 20 miles (32 km) to Harrisville. NY-126 leads west by a more direct route 16 miles (26 km) to Watertown and southeast 14 miles (23 km) to Croghan.

== Media ==
Champion Hill, located between Carthage and Watertown, is the birthplace of the majority of Watertown local TV stations. It hosted the original facilities for WWNY-TV (1954–1970) and later WPBS-TV (as WNPE, 1971–1977). WWNY's city of license still officially names Carthage, even though WWNY's studios have now moved to downtown Watertown.

== Demographics ==
Historical population
Census	Pop.	Note	%±
1840	600		—
1850	700		16.7%
1860	1,500		114.3%
1880	1,912		—
1890	2,278		19.1%
1900	2,895		27.1%
1910	3,563		23.1%
1920	4,320		21.2%
1930	4,460		3.2%
1940	4,207		−5.7%
1950	4,420		5.1%
1960	4,216		−4.6%
1970	3,889		−7.8%
1980	3,643		−6.3%
1990	4,344		19.2%
2000	3,721		−14.3%
2010	3,747		0.7%
2020	3,236		−13.6%
U.S. Decennial Census

=== 2020 census ===
As of the 2020 census, Carthage had a population of 3,236. The median age was 32.5 years. 27.0% of residents were under the age of 18 and 15.1% of residents were 65 years of age or older. For every 100 females there were 95.3 males, and for every 100 females age 18 and over there were 89.6 males age 18 and over.

95.7% of residents lived in urban areas, while 4.3% lived in rural areas.

There were 1,359 households in Carthage, of which 35.2% had children under the age of 18 living in them. Of all households, 36.6% were married-couple households, 22.4% were households with a male householder and no spouse or partner present, and 32.2% were households with a female householder and no spouse or partner present. About 34.1% of all households were made up of individuals and 13.6% had someone living alone who was 65 years of age or older.

There were 1,583 housing units, of which 14.2% were vacant. The homeowner vacancy rate was 4.1% and the rental vacancy rate was 12.2%.

Racial composition as of the 2020 census
Race	Number	Percent
White	2,753	85.1%
Black or African American	118	3.6%
American Indian and Alaska Native	11	0.3%
Asian	51	1.6%
Native Hawaiian and Other Pacific Islander	11	0.3%
Some other race	47	1.5%
Two or more races	245	7.6%
Hispanic or Latino (of any race)	123	3.8%

=== 2000 census ===
At the 2000 census, there were 3,721 people, 1,417 households and 956 families residing in the village. The population density was 1,480.4 inhabitants per square mile (571.6/km^{2}). There were 1,626 housing units at an average density of 646.9 per square mile (249.8/km^{2}). The racial makeup of the village was 91.32% White, 4.27% African American, 0.21% Native American, 1.05% Asian, 0.05% Pacific Islander, 1.10% from other races, and 1.99% from two or more races. Hispanic or Latino of any race were 2.69% of the population.

There were 1,417 households, of which 36.0% had children under the age of 18 living with them, 49.1% were married couples living together, 14.9% had a female householder with no husband present, and 32.5% were non-families. 27.2% of all households were made up of individuals, and 12.6% had someone living alone who was 65 years of age or older. The average household size was 2.53 and the average family size was 3.08.

Age distribution was 28.3% under the age of 18, 9.0% from 18 to 24, 28.6% from 25 to 44, 19.6% from 45 to 64, and 14.5% who were 65 years of age or older. The median age was 34 years. For every 100 females, there were 91.1 males. For every 100 females age 18 and over, there were 84.9 males.

The median household income was $23,583, and the median family income was $32,083. Males had a median income of $31,397 versus $18,713 for females. The per capita income for the village was $13,029. About 18.6% of families and 23.5% of the population were below the poverty line, including 33.9% of those under age 18 and 14.4% of those age 65 or over.

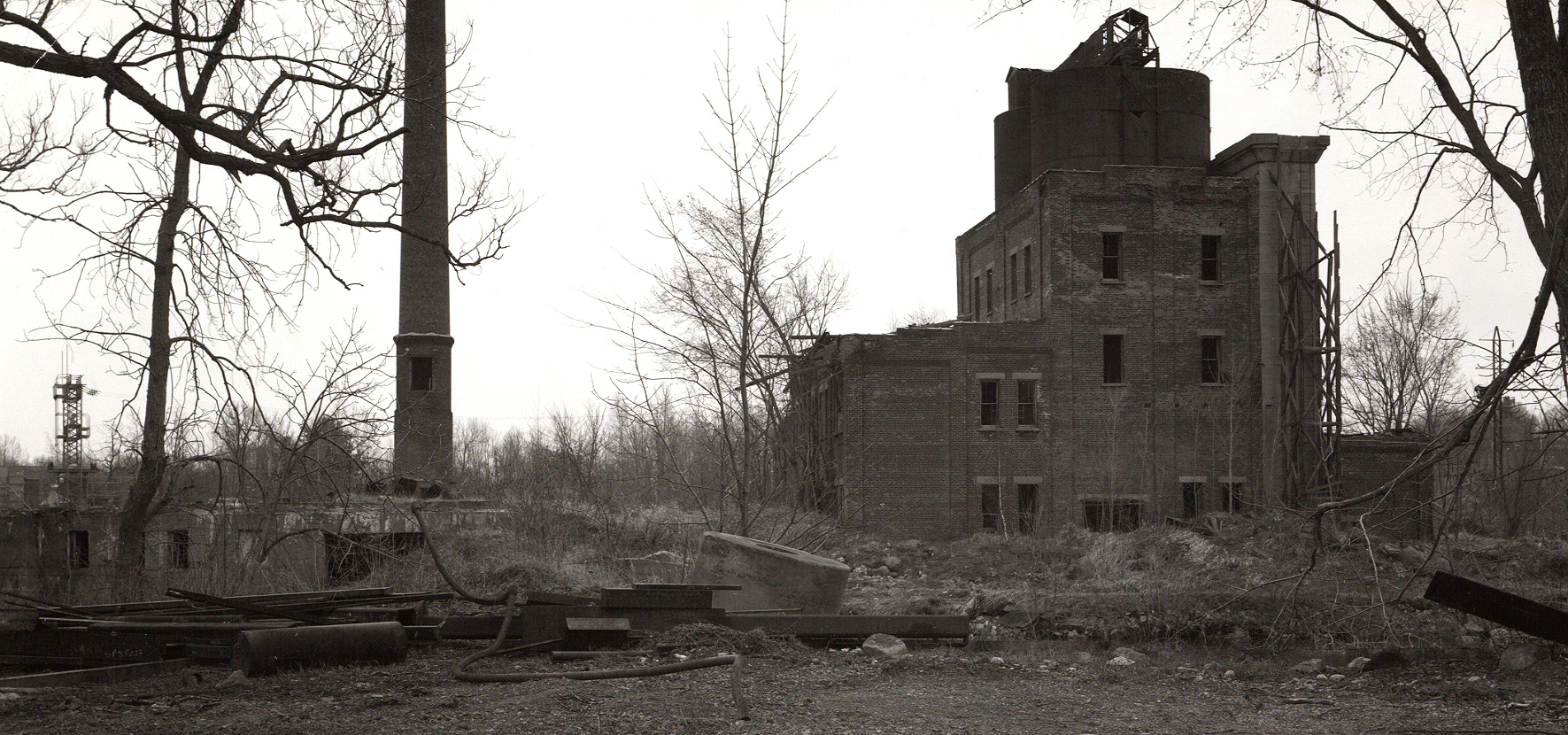
The remains of the Island Mill on Tannery Island, Carthage. 1993, 5x7 negative.

== See also ==
- Carthage, South Dakota, named after Carthage, New York
