= New York State Route 26 =

Highway in New York

New York State Route 26
- NY 26 highlighted in red

Route information
- Maintained by NYSDOT, Madison County and the city of Rome
- Length: 203.80 mi (327.98 km)
- Existed: 1930–present

Major junctions
- South end: PA 267 at the Pennsylvania state line near Vestal
- I-86 / NY 17 in Vestal; I-81 in Whitney Point; US 20 in Madison; NY 49 / NY 69 / NY 365 in Rome; NY 12 in Lowville; US 11 in Philadelphia
- North end: NY 12 in Alexandria Bay

Location
- Country: United States
- State: New York
- Counties: Broome, Cortland, Chenango, Madison, Oneida, Lewis, Jefferson

Highway system
- New York Highways; Interstate; US; State; Reference; Parkways
← NY 25D	→ NY 26A

New York State Route 26 (NY 26) is a north–south state highway that runs for 203.80 miles (327.98 km) through Central New York in the United States. Its southern terminus is located at the Pennsylvania state line south of the town of Vestal in Broome County, where it becomes Pennsylvania Route 267 (PA 267). Its northern terminus is located at a junction with NY 12 in the village of Alexandria Bay in Jefferson County. NY 26 serves three cities along its routing; one directly (Rome) and two via other roadways (Binghamton via NY 17, and Watertown via NY 3). NY 26 also intersects several other primary routes including I-81 in Barker, an overlap with U.S. Route 20 (US 20) in Madison, NY 12 in Lowville, and an overlap with US 11 in the Jefferson County town of Philadelphia.

NY 26, as a single route, was established in the 1930 renumbering of state highways in New York; however, portions of the route had been signed state routes since the 1920s. Since 1930, the route has been realigned several times in the North Country, resulting in a modern routing significantly different from its initial alignment. For a brief period during the 1970s, NY 26 ended in Carthage. The truncation directly led to the elimination of one of NY 26's two spur routes, and the second was absorbed by other routes shortly afterward.

== Route description ==
Most of NY 26 is maintained by the New York State Department of Transportation (NYSDOT); however, two locally maintained sections exist in Madison and Oneida counties. In Madison County, the route is county-maintained from NY 46 to U.S. Route 20 (US 20), where it overlaps with the unsigned County Route 79 (CR 79). In the Oneida County city of Rome, NY 26 is city-maintained from the north end of its overlap with NY 46 to the northern boundary of the city's inner district.

=== Broome County ===
NY 26 begins at the Pennsylvania state line in Vestal, where it connects to PA 267. The road heads northward through Vestal as a two-lane highway, passing Wildcat Hill and Pierson Hill as it runs along the base of a valley surrounding Choconut Creek. It serves mostly rural areas for its first six miles (9.7 km) before entering a larger valley encompassing the Susquehanna River. Here, the route widens to four lanes as it enters the densely populated town center of Vestal and connects to NY 434 by way of a partial cloverleaf interchange. NY 26 continues northward, meeting I-86/NY 17 at a full cloverleaf interchange, which links NY 26 to the city of Binghamton. Past I-86, it continues over a bridge crossing the Susquehanna River and enters the village of Endicott on the north bank. Here, NY 26 merges into NY 17C at an interchange just east of the village center.

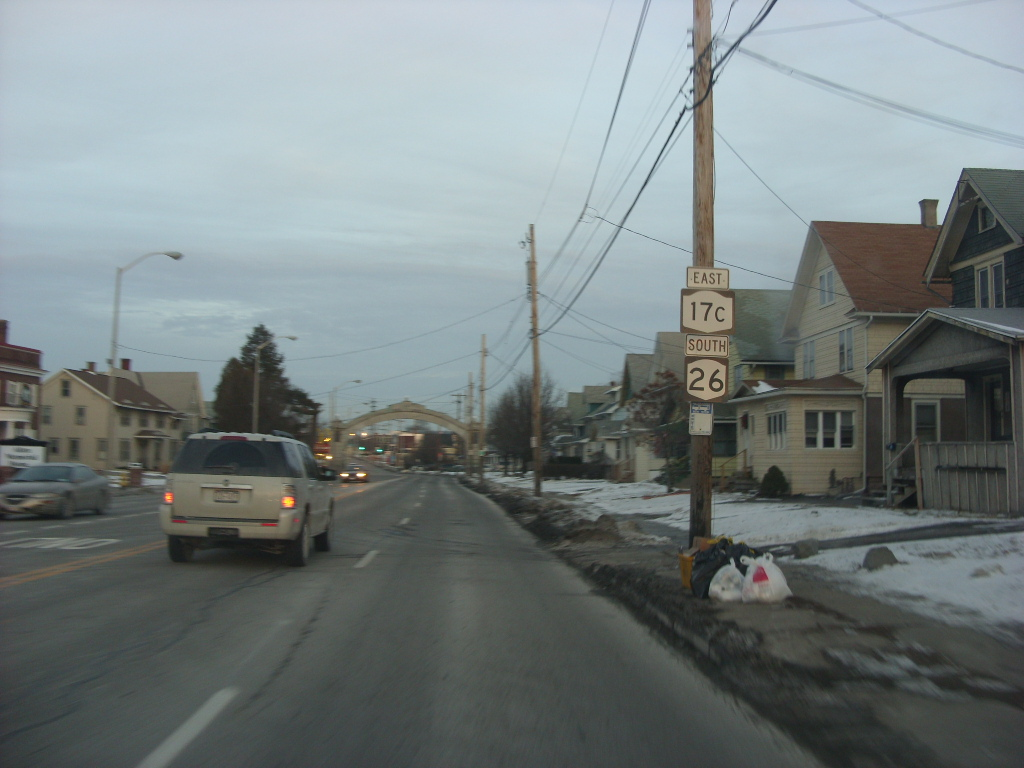
NY 17C east and NY 26 south in Endicott

The two routes overlap for several blocks through Endicott, following the two-lane Main Street westward through the village's central business district. At Nanticoke Avenue, NY 26 turns to the north, following the street through the community's northern residential neighborhoods. Outside of Endicott, the homes give way to significantly less developed areas as the highway runs through the Nanticoke Creek valley. After four miles (6.4 km), the route reaches the small hamlet of Union Center, where NY 38B leaves to the northwest toward its parent route, NY 38. Past Union Center, NY 26 slowly turns to the northeast as it traverses the town of Maine, following Nanticoke Creek as it runs through the town center. The waterway splits into two branches just past the hamlet of Maine, and NY 26 stays with the creek's east branch as the route crosses rural parts of the towns of Nanticoke and Lisle.

In Lisle, Nanticoke Creek's east branch leads NY 26 into the Tioughnioga River valley, where the route connects to Interstate 81 (I-81) by way of a partial diamond interchange just outside the village of Whitney Point in the adjacent town of Triangle. The highway continues into the community, becoming concurrent with US 11 for a single block to East Main Street. Here, NY 26 splits from US 11 but joins NY 79 in order to cross the Tioughnioga River. The overlap ends at a junction on the east bank, where NY 79 heads south along the river, and NY 206 begins and heads eastward. NY 26, meanwhile, follows the nearby Otselic River and its surrounding gully as it runs northeastward toward the Cortland County line. Along the way, the highway runs along the east side of Whitney Point Reservoir and serves Dorchester Park, a recreation area overlooking the spillway.

=== Cortland and Chenango counties ===
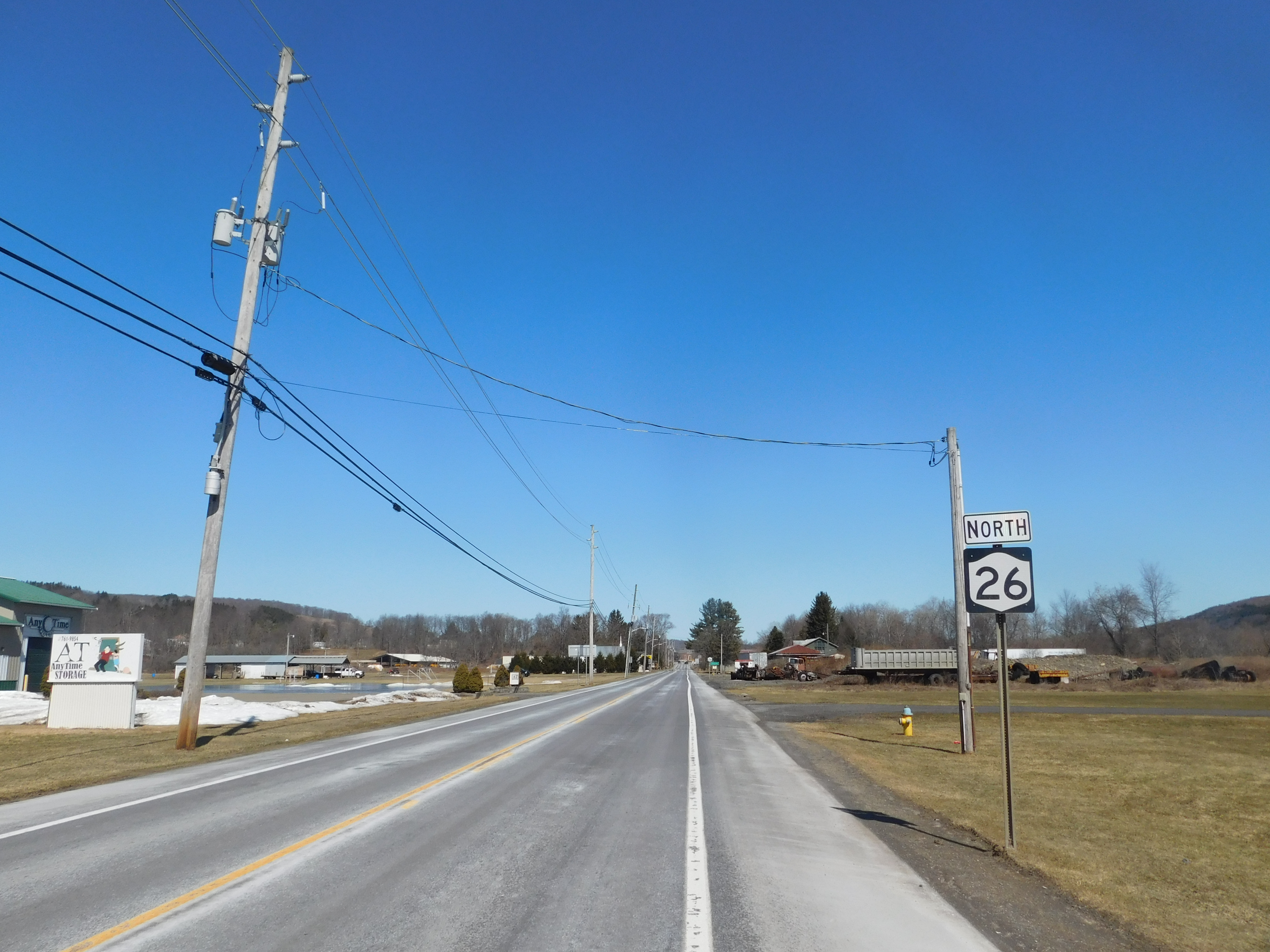
NY 26 heading northbound in Cincinnatus

A rural 10-mile (16 km) stretch brings NY 26 to the riverside hamlet of Willet, where it intersects with NY 41. The junction marks the start of a 3.8-mile-long (6.1 km) concurrency that runs into the nearby town of Cincinnatus. NY 26 and Route 41 intersect with NY 221 just to the west of Willet before splitting southwest of the hamlet of Cincinnatus. The next intersection along the road serves as the west end of NY 23, which heads eastward into Chenango County. From here, NY 26 runs generally northeastward to the hamlet of Taylor, where it turns to the east at a crossroad just north of the community's center. The track of the route becomes more northeastward as it crosses into Chenango County.

In Chenango County, NY 26 serves only a handful of isolated hamlets scattered across the undeveloped Otselic River valley. About seven miles (11 km) from Taylor, the route reaches the hamlet of South Otselic, home to the National Register of Historic Places-listed South Otselic Historic District and the Holden B. Mathewson House. Another 7 miles brings the route to the hamlet of Otselic, where NY 26 intersects the east–west NY 80 on the opposite side of the river from the community. NY 80 turns northward at this point, overlapping NY 26 as the two roads bends northwestward along the riverbank into Madison County.

=== Madison and Oneida counties ===
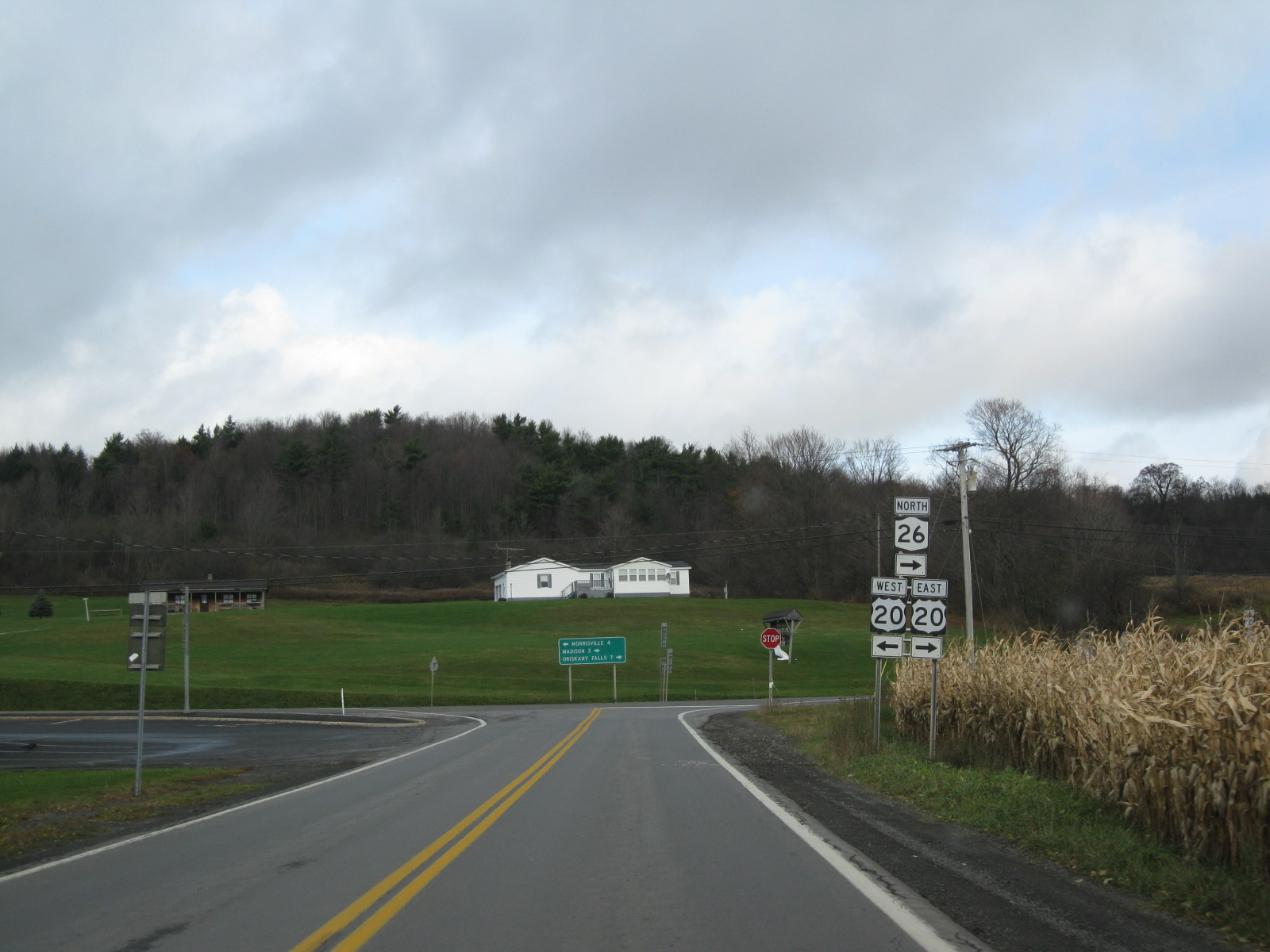
NY 26 northbound approaching US 20

The overlap extends for 2.5 miles (4.0 km) into Madison County to the hamlet of Georgetown, where NY 80 forks to the northwest into a narrow creek valley. NY 26, meanwhile, runs northeast from Georgetown through the Otselic River valley, which begins to narrow as the river approaches its source in the northern part of the town. While the river tapers off, NY 26 climbs slightly in elevation to wind its way northeastward around a series of mountains and hills. The road descends into a narrow creek valley at West Eaton, and the highway proceeds east along Eaton Brook to the hamlet of Eaton on the Chenango River. The stream ends here, leaving the route to traverse another set of mountains to reach a low-lying, marshy area near Bouckville. Here, NY 26 crosses NY 46 ahead of a junction with US 20. NY 26 turns east at the junction, following US 20 through Bouckville toward the village of Madison.

US 20 and NY 26 pick up NY 12B at a junction east of Bouckville, and all three routes run east–west through Madison as Main Street. The brief stretch of homes and businesses along Main Street quickly fades outside the village limits, and NY 12B and NY 26 leave US 20 soon afterward. While US 20 continues to the east, NY 12B and NY 26 proceed northeast into Oneida County and the village of Oriskany Falls on the county's southern edge. The routes head along Madison Street to the community's central business district, where NY 26 doubles back to the southwest on Main Street. It continues on this track to the western fringe of the village, where it returns to a northwesterly track and heads for less developed parts of the town of Augusta. The route goes across rolling farmland for several miles before entering the town of Vernon and its hamlet of Vernon Center, where NY 31 terminates at a traffic circle in the center of the community.

About one mile (1.6 km) north of Vernon Center, NY 26 intersects NY 5 at a rural junction two miles (3.2 km) east of the village of Vernon. From here, NY 26 traverses more open farmland, crossing over the New York State Thruway in Westmoreland before entering the outer district of the city of Rome. The route passes the Oneida and Mohawk correctional facilities just ahead of a junction with NY 365, a four-lane divided highway. NY 26 turns east here, overlapping with NY 365 for just under two miles (3.2 km) to a directional T interchange with NY 49 and NY 69. While NY 365 continues northeastward around the perimeter of downtown Rome, NY 26 exits the highway and immediately begins an overlap with both NY 49 and NY 69. The three routes head north on the four-lane East Erie Boulevard, passing a handful of industrial warehouses before crossing over CSX Transportation's Mohawk Subdivision rail line and the Erie Canal on their way into downtown.

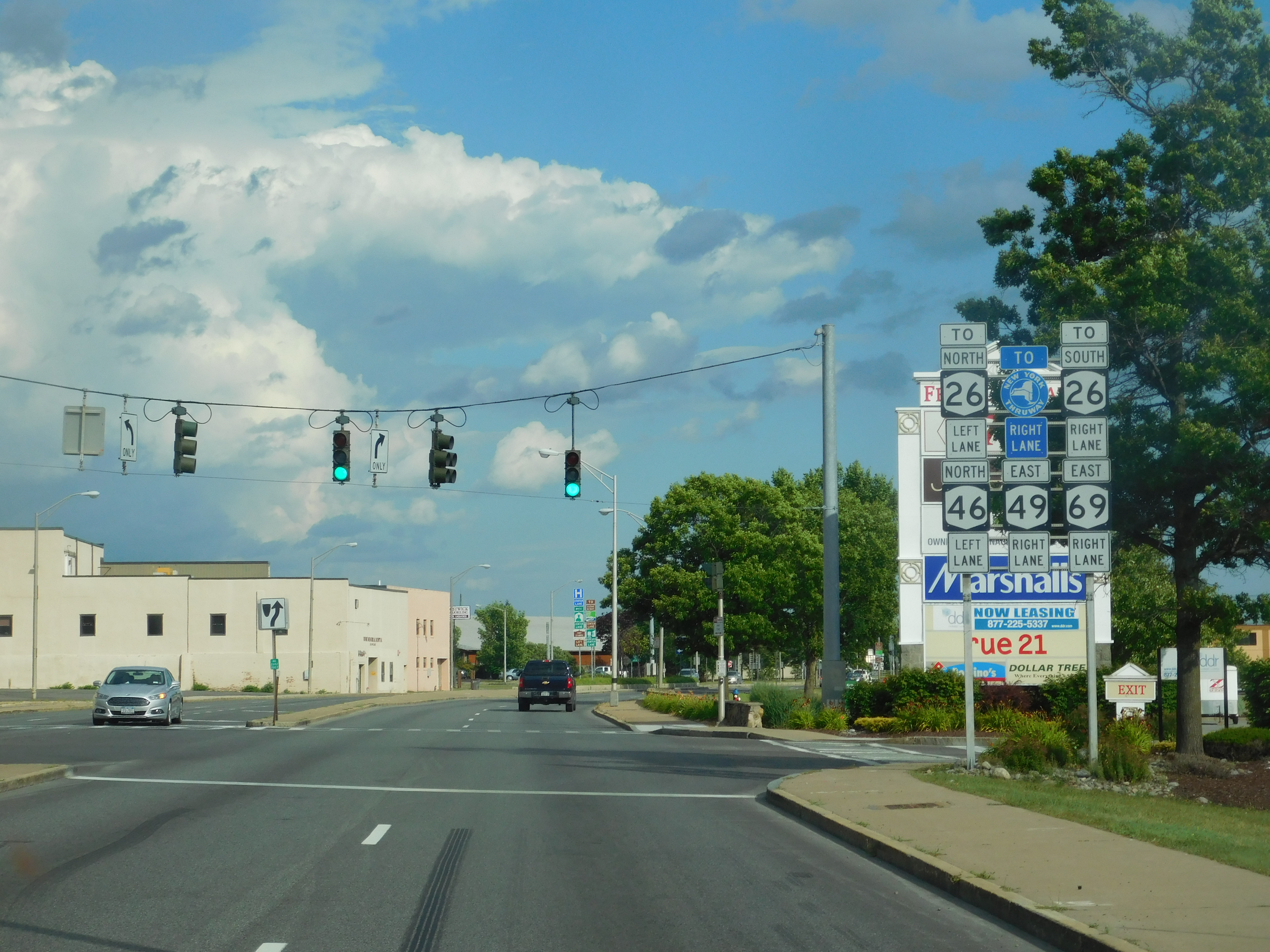
NY 69 and NY 49 approaching the end of the overlap with NY 46 and NY 26

The highway runs through a commercial strip for several blocks to an intersection with Black River Boulevard and NY 46. While NY 46 southbound joins NY 49 and NY 69 to the northwest, NY 26 turns northeast to overlap with NY 46 northbound along the four-lane Black River Boulevard, passing along the southeastern edge of the Fort Stanwix National Monument. The overlap continues for several commercial and residential blocks to East Bloomfield Street, at which point NY 26 turns northward to follow the two-lane East Bloomfield and Turin streets across the mostly residential northern part of the city. The homes become more sporadic as the highway leaves Rome for the town of Lee, home to several hamlets along the west side of Delta Lake. North of the reservoir, the route crosses gradually less developed and more open areas as it crosses into Lewis County.

=== Lewis and Jefferson counties ===
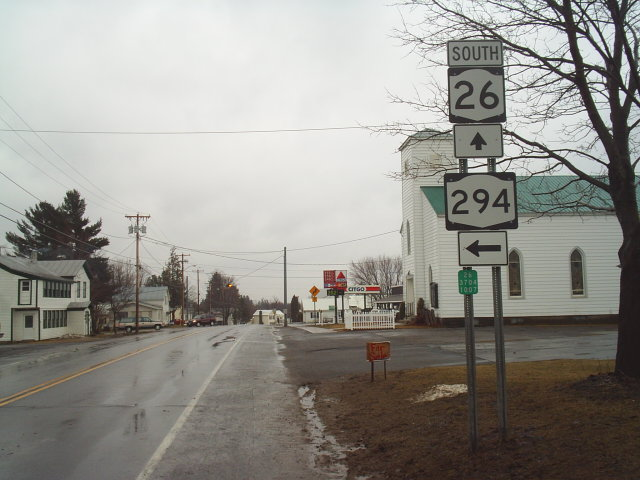
NY 26 at an intersection with NY 294 in West Leyden

Just across the county line in the town of Lewis, NY 26 enters the hamlet of West Leyden, built up around the route's junction with the west end of NY 294. From West Leyden, the highway heads generally northeastward across another prolonged stretch of farmland, briefly entering the Constableville village limits and passing over the Sugar River on its way to an intersection with NY 12D. The straight path to the northeast continues as part of NY 12D while NY 26 turns northwestward onto NY 12D's right of way, following the eastern edge of Tug Hill into the town of Turin. In Turin, NY 26 passes through several hamlets then enters the village of Turin. It then enters the town of Martinsburg and passes through more small hamlets, before entering the town of Lowville, where the route connects to NY 12 in the southernmost part of the village of Lowville. NY 12 merges with NY 26 here, and the two routes follow South State Street into the community's central business district. Here, NY 12 and NY 26 meet NY 812 at a four-way junction with Dayan Street and Shady Avenue.

While NY 12 turns west to follow Dayan Street, NY 26 continues northwest on North State Street, overlapping with NY 812 for several blocks before the latter route splits off to the northeast on Bostwick Street. The business and homes of Lowville lead to much less developed areas at the northern village line, and NY 26 traverses little more than open, rolling fields for the next five miles (8.0 km). Just north of the Lowville town line in Denmark, the highway meets NY 410, a short connector serving the village of Castorland. Another 6-mile (9.7 km) stretch of mostly undeveloped fields brings the route across the Deer River and into Jefferson County, the last county on NY 26's 200-mile (320 km) route. The highway immediately enters the village of West Carthage, where it briefly becomes concurrent with NY 126 through the sparsely populated western part of the community.

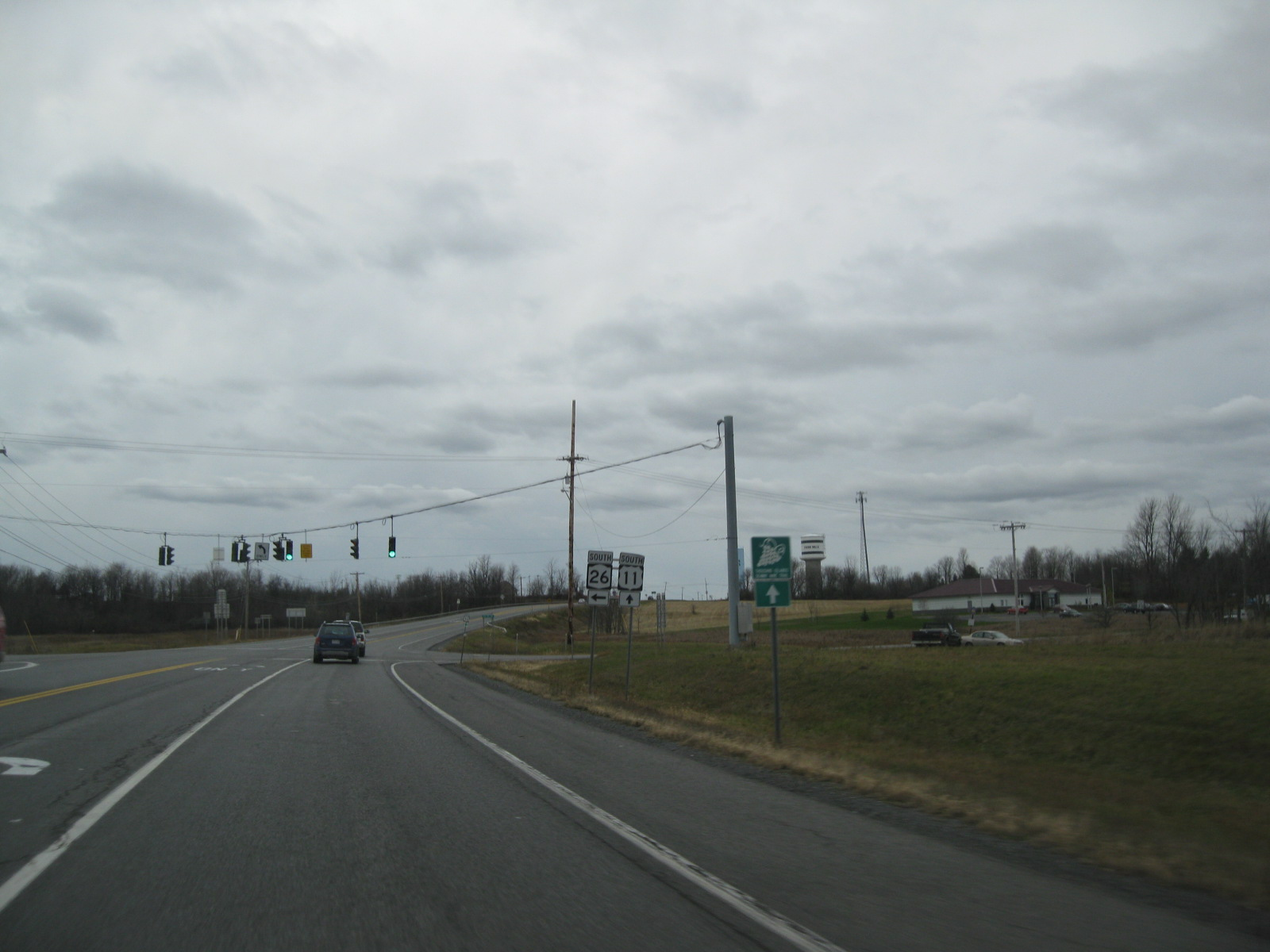
NY 26 southbound at south end of overlap with US 11 in town of Philadelphia

Past West Carthage, the route loosely follows the Black River across rolling farmland in the town of Champion to reach the hamlet of Great Bend, located across the Black River from the grounds of Fort Drum. Here, NY 26 meets NY 3 before crossing the river and entering Fort Drum. The route runs northwestward across the military reservation to the town of Le Ray, home to an intersection with US 11 just outside the Evans Mills village limits. NY 26 joins US 11 here for the second time, following the Indian River northeast across generally rural areas to reach the village of Philadelphia. The conjoined routes cross the river before splitting in the center of the community. At this point, NY 26 returns to a northwesterly alignment as it traverses rolling farmland for 6 miles (9.7 km) to access the village of Theresa. Named Mill Street, the route crosses the Indian River again before changing names to Commercial Street and gradually curving to the southwest.

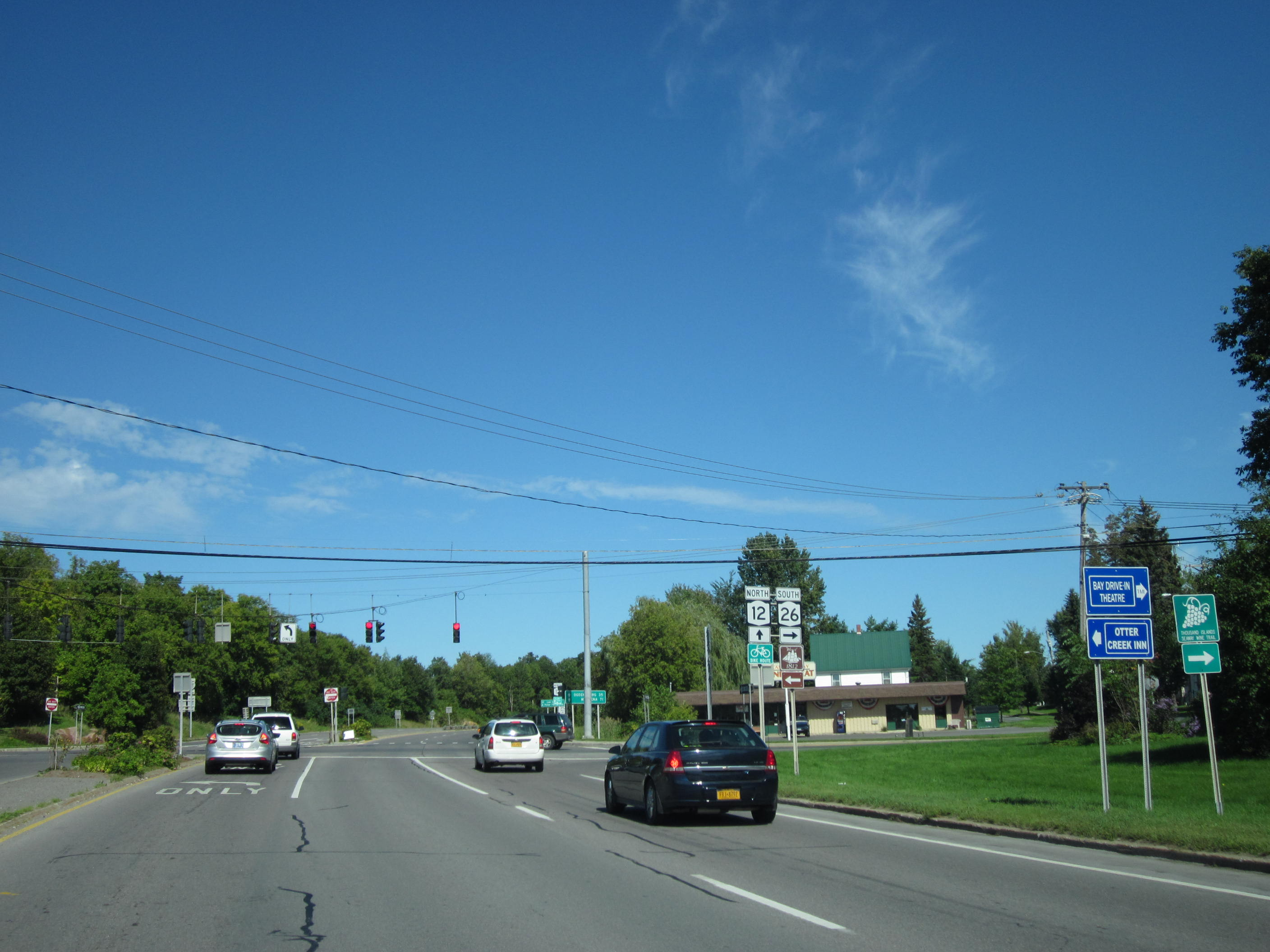
NY 12 northbound at NY 26's northern terminus

NY 26 soon enters Theresa's central business district, where it turns northwest onto Main Street. Commercial Street continues southwest as CR 46, once part of NY 37D. NY 26 runs northwest through the remainder of Theresa before veering southwest across another undeveloped stretch to a junction with NY 37 and NY 411. The route turns north at this point, becoming concurrent with NY 37 for three miles (4.8 km) through a rural section of the town of Theresa. At the north end of the overlap, NY 26 splits to the northwest toward the town of Alexandria, where it meets CR 192 at a junction that was once the western terminus of NY 26B, one of two spur routes of NY 26 that no longer exist. From CR 192, NY 26 continues northwest across rolling farmland to the village of Alexandria Bay, where the route ends at a junction with NY 12 several blocks south of the Saint Lawrence River.

== History ==
=== Origins ===
In 1908, the New York State Legislature created a statewide system of unsigned legislative routes. One route created at this time was Route 27, which began in Forestport and followed what is now NY 12, NY 12D, and NY 26 north through Boonville and Lowville to West Carthage. At this point, Route 27 proceeded northeast to Carthage on modern NY 126 and west to Watertown on current NY 3. It continued generally northward from Watertown to a terminus in Alexandria Bay. In 1910, the legislature established Route 30-a, a connector between Route 27 in Carthage and Route 30 (now US 11) in Antwerp via current NY 3 and the U.S. Military Highway through Fort Drum. On March 1, 1921, Route 30-a was redesignated as Route 49 while Route 27 was extended northeast to Ogdensburg along what is now NY 26, CR 192, and NY 37.

When the first set of posted routes in New York were assigned in 1924, the segment of legislative Route 27 between Alexandria Bay and Ogdensburg became part of NY 3 while the portion of Route 27 from Foresport to Lowville was included in NY 12. By 1926, the Lowville–Carthage section of legislative Route 27 and all of Route 49 was designated as part of NY 48, which continued west from Antwerp to NY 3 in Alexandria on what is now CR 193, CR 194 and NY 26. Also created by 1926 was NY 46, which began in Oriskany Falls and went north to Rome on modern NY 26. Past Rome, NY 46 followed its current alignment to Boonville. The portion of what is now NY 26 south of US 20 was unnumbered prior to 1930.

=== Designation and realignments ===
Modern NY 26 was established as part of the 1930 renumbering of state highways in New York. It began at the Pennsylvania state line south of Endicott and went north to Carthage over its modern alignment. From Oriskany Falls to Rome, it replaced NY 46, which was moved onto a new alignment to the west that passed through the city of Oneida. NY 26 continued north to Turin via a previously unnumbered road and overlapped with NY 12 from there to Lowville. Past Lowville, NY 26 progressed northward through Carthage, Antwerp and Theresa to Alexandria Bay, replacing all of NY 48 and part of NY 3, which was realigned to follow its modern alignment east of Watertown as part of the renumbering. Also assigned as part of the renumbering was NY 411, a connector highway between NY 26 near Theresa and US 11 in Philadelphia.

NY 26 was realigned in the mid-1950s, to bypass Fort Drum to the west. The route now overlapped NY 3 northwest and west from Carthage to Black River, where it turned northwest to follow a surface road known as the Watertown Bypass to Calcium. NY 26 joined US 11 at a junction north of Calcium and followed it northwest to Antwerp, where it joined its previous alignment. The state of New York assumed ownership and maintenance of the bypass in 1960, at which time it was designated as NY 181. The easternmost section of the highway was realigned c. 1963 to bypass Black River to the west. It separated from NY 3 west of Black River and followed the Black River north to Pearl Street, where it met its old routing. NY 181, which NY 26 overlapped between Calcium and Black River, was renumbered to NY 342 around this time.

The Southern Tier Expressway (NY 17) was open from Vestal to Johnson City, but was not slated to become part of NY 17 until the segment of the expressway from Johnson City to I-81 was completed. As a result, NY 17 exited the expressway at Vestal, overlapped NY 26 south to Vestal Parkway (modern NY 434), and then followed it into downtown Binghamton. The Johnson City–I-81 piece of the expressway was completed and opened to traffic by 1973. At this time the overlap was eliminated, and NY 17 was realigned to follow the expressway while NY 17's former routing from Vestal to Binghamton became an extension of NY 434 on July 1, 1974. Like the NY 17 realignment, the NY 434 extension had been planned years before.

=== Truncation and re-extension ===
Following the 1950s realignment, NY 26 overlapped with other routes for 36 miles (58 km) in Jefferson County, 65 percent of the route's 56-mile (90 km) alignment through the county. In 1975, officials from NYSDOT Region 7 proposed a pair of designation changes to eliminate most of the overlaps. NY 26 would be truncated to end at NY 3 and NY 26A in Carthage, and its former routing from Antwerp to Alexandria Bay would be redesignated as NY 283. Both suggestions were implemented by 1977. The changes were rendered moot on August 1, 1979, as ownership and maintenance of the portions of NY 283 from US 11 in Antwerp to NY 411 in Theresa and from LaFargeville Road in Theresa to NY 37 west of the village was transferred from the state of New York to Jefferson County as part of a highway maintenance swap between the two levels of government.

In return, the state acquired the county-maintained LaFargeville Road from NY 37 to NY 283 and a series of county roads (Broad and Martin streets and Great Bend and Fort Drum roads) connecting West Carthage to Evans Mills. NY 26 was subsequently rerouted to follow the new West Carthage–Evans Mills state highway to US 11 near Evans Mills. It overlapped with US 11 from there to Philadelphia before continuing to Theresa on former NY 411. The route exited Theresa on LaFargeville Road, and NY 26 used a short overlap with NY 37 to rejoin its pre-1970s alignment at Wilson Road. At this point, the route continued to Alexandria Bay as it had prior to the 1970s truncation. The former routing of NY 26 between Fort Drum and Theresa via Antwerp (and thus the former alignment of NY 283 between Antwerp and Theresa) became CR 194 while the former part of NY 26 and NY 283 west of Theresa became CR 193.

=== Reconstruction ===
From 2005 to 2006, NY 26 was reconstructed from NY 17C north to the Nanticoke Creek in the village of Endicott and town of Union. This included changing from four lanes to a three lane roadway, with the center lane being a bi-directional left turn lane. Also structural repairs were completed on the railroad bridge over NY 26. The $9 million project was completed in December 2006 by the Vacri Construction Corporation of Binghamton.

Around the Fort Drum area, several projects were completed on NY 26. The first project completed in 2017, reconfigured the intersection with Oneida and Ontario avenues to improve safety and reduce congestion. The second project, completed on August 24, 2018, added a new bridge that connected the airfield area of the base to the main cantonment area. This $7.6 million project, allowed on-base traffic to cross NY 26 without having to leave the base, which in turn reduced congestion on NY 26. Then on May 13, 2019, work began on the third $2.9 million project to reconstruct the intersection with US-11 near Fort Drum in Jefferson County. The project provided additional turning lanes and added a slip ramp onto NY 26 for northbound traffic on US 11. The third project was completed on December 10, 2019.

== Future ==
There are efforts within NYSDOT to renumber NY 365, which overlaps NY 26, and NY 49 (from Utica to Thruway Exit 33 in the Town of Verona) to NY Route 790, with the eventual plan of renumbering it again as an extension of I-790. The cost for the conversion to Interstate standards is estimated to be between $150 million and $200 million.

U.S. Representative Michael Arcuri introduced legislation in July 2010 that would redesignate the 11-mile (18 km) portion of NY 49 from the North–South Arterial in Utica to NY 825 in Rome as part of I-790. The conversion is expected to cost between $1.5 and $2 million, which would be used to install new signage along the expressway. By adding the Utica–Rome Expressway to the Interstate Highway System, the area would receive approximately $10 million in additional federal highway funding over the next five years. According to Arcuri, the proposed redesignation is part of a larger, long-term goal of creating an Interstate Highway-standard freeway that would begin at Thruway exit 33 in Verona and pass through Rome before ending at Thruway exit 31. The portion of NY 49 east of NY 825 already meets Interstate Highway standards.

== Major intersections ==
County	Location	mi	km	Destinations	Notes
Broome	Vestal	0.00	0.00	PA 267 south	Continuation into Pennsylvania
Broome	Vestal	6.75	10.86	NY 434 – Vestal	Partial cloverleaf interchange
Broome	Vestal	6.96	11.20	I-86 / NY 17 – Binghamton, Corning	Cloverleaf interchange; current eastern terminus of I-86; exits 67S-N on I-86/NY 17
Broome	Endicott	7.70	12.39	NY 17C east – Endwell	Eastern terminus of NY 17C / NY 26 overlap; partial cloverleaf interchange
Broome	Endicott	8.94	14.39	NY 17C west	Western terminus of NY 17C / NY 26 overlap
Broome	Maine	13.28	21.37	NY 38B west – Newark Valley	Hamlet of Union Center; eastern terminus of NY 38B
Broome	Barker	27.72	44.61	I-81 south – Binghamton	Exit 29 (I-81); southbound entrance only
Broome	Whitney Point	28.03	45.11	US 11 south – Binghamton	Southern terminus of US 11 / NY 26 overlap
Broome	Whitney Point	28.12	45.25	US 11 north / NY 79 west to I-81 north – Cortland, Ithaca	Northern terminus of US 11 / NY 26 overlap; western terminus of NY 26 / NY 79 overlap
Broome	Whitney Point	28.20	45.38	NY 79 east / NY 206 east – Greene, Chenango Forks	Eastern terminus of NY 26 / NY 79 overlap; western terminus of NY 206
Cortland	Willet	38.76	62.38	NY 41 south – Sidney	Southern terminus of NY 26 / NY 41 overlap
Cortland	Willet	39.34	63.31	NY 221 west – Marathon	Eastern terminus of NY 221
Cortland	Cincinnatus	42.59	68.54	NY 41 north – McGraw, Cortland	Northern terminus of NY 26 / NY 41 overlap
Cortland	Cincinnatus	43.90	70.65	NY 23 east – Norwich	Western terminus of NY 23
Chenango	Otselic	61.53	99.02	NY 80 east – Sherburne	Southern terminus of NY 26 / NY 80 overlap
Madison	Georgetown	65.11	104.78	NY 80 west – New Woodstock	Northern terminus of NY 26 / NY 80 overlap
Madison	Eaton	78.34	126.08	NY 46 – Munnsville, Hamilton	
Madison	Eaton	78.86	126.91	US 20 west – Morrisville	Western terminus of US 20 / NY 26 overlap
Madison	Town of Madison	80.51	129.57	NY 12B south / NY 46 Truck south – Hamilton	Western terminus of NY 12B / NY 26 overlap
Madison	Town of Madison	83.51	134.40	US 20 east – Sangerfield	Eastern terminus of US 20 / NY 26 overlap
Oneida	Oriskany Falls	86.06	138.50	NY 12B north (Main Street) – Hamilton College	Eastern terminus of NY 12B / NY 26 overlap
Oneida	Town of Vernon	95.26	153.31	NY 31 west (Youngs Road)	Eastern terminus of NY 31; hamlet of Vernon Center
Oneida	Town of Vernon	96.65	155.54	NY 5 (Seneca Turnpike) to I-90 / New York Thruway – Vernon, Kirkland	To I-90 / Thruway via NY 5 west
Oneida	Rome	104.95	168.90	NY 365 west (Rome–Oneida Road) to I-90 / New York Thruway – Oneida	Southern terminus of NY 26 / NY 365 overlap
Oneida	Rome	106.75	171.80	NY 365 east to NY 825 – Griffiss Tech. Park, Utica	Northern terminus of NY 26 / NY 365 overlap; interchange
Oneida	Rome	107.15	172.44	NY 49 east / NY 69 east to I-90 east / New York Thruway east – Utica	Southern terminus of NY 26 / NY 49 / NY 69 overlap; interchange
Oneida	Rome	108.21	174.15	NY 46 south / NY 49 west / NY 69 west – Fort Stanwix National Monument	Northern terminus of NY 26 / NY 49 / NY 69 overlap; southern terminus of NY 26 / NY 46 overlap
Oneida	Rome	108.80	175.10	NY 46 north	Northern terminus of NY 26 / NY 46 overlap
Lewis	Lewis	126.35	203.34	NY 294 east – Boonville	Hamlet of West Leyden; western terminus of NY 294
Lewis	West Turin	137.24	220.87	NY 12D – Lyons Falls, Boonville	
Lewis	Village of Lowville	150.77	242.64	NY 12 south – Utica	Southern terminus of NY 12 / NY 26 overlap
Lewis	Village of Lowville	151.35	243.57	NY 12 north / NY 812 – Watertown	Northern terminus of NY 12 / NY 26 overlap; southern terminus of NY 26 / NY 812 overlap; southern terminus of NY 812
Lewis	Village of Lowville	151.72	244.17	NY 812 north – Lewis County Fairgrounds	Northern terminus of NY 26 / NY 812 overlap
Lewis	Denmark	158.18	254.57	NY 410 – Castorland, Naumburg, Beaver Falls	
Jefferson	West Carthage	165.66	266.60	NY 126 east – Carthage	Eastern terminus of NY 26 / NY 126 overlap
Jefferson	West Carthage	166.44	267.86	NY 126 west – Watertown	Western terminus of NY 26 / NY 126 overlap
Jefferson	Champion	172.51	277.63	NY 3 – Watertown, Deferiet	Hamlet of Great Bend
Jefferson	Le Ray	177.82	286.17	US 11 south – Watertown	Southern terminus of US 11 / NY 26 overlap
Jefferson	Village of Philadelphia	184.87	297.52	US 11 north – Gouverneur	Northern terminus of US 11 / NY 26 overlap
Jefferson	Village of Theresa			CR 46 (Commercial Street)	Former eastern terminus of NY 37D
Jefferson	Town of Theresa	192.88	310.41	NY 37 south – Watertown NY 411 west to I-81 – Lafargeville	Eastern terminus of NY 411; southern terminus of NY 26 / NY 37 overlap
Jefferson	Town of Theresa	195.48	314.59	NY 37 north – Ogdensburg	Northern terminus of NY 26 / NY 37 overlap
Jefferson	Alexandria	200.13	322.08	CR 192 – Redwood	Former western terminus of NY 26B; hamlet of Browns Corners
Jefferson	Alexandria Bay	203.80	327.98	NY 12 – Clayton, Morristown	Northern terminus
Jefferson	Alexandria Bay	203.80	327.98	Church Street ( NY 971K)	Continuation beyond NY 12; southern terminus of unsigned NY 971K
1.000 mi = 1.609 km; 1.000 km = 0.621 mi: Concurrency terminus; Incomplete access

== Suffixed routes ==
- NY 26A was an alternate route of NY 26 between Lowville, Lewis County, and Carthage, Jefferson County. While NY 26 followed a direct routing between the two villages, NY 26A veered to the east to serve Croghan. The route was assigned as part of the 1930 renumbering of state highways in New York and renumbered to NY 126 and NY 812 in the late 1970s.
- NY 26B was a spur route in Alexandria that connected NY 26 to NY 37 in the hamlet of Redwood in Jefferson County. The route was assigned c. 1931 and renumbered to NY 287 in the mid-1970s when NY 26 was cut back to Carthage.

== See also ==
- List of county routes in Jefferson County, New York
- List of county routes in Madison County, New York
