= New York State Route 411 =

State highway in Jefferson County, New York, US

New York State Route 411
- Map of Jefferson County in northern New York with NY 411 highlighted in red

Route information
- Maintained by NYSDOT
- Length: 7.55 mi (12.15 km)
- Existed: 1930–present

Major junctions
- West end: NY 180 in Orleans
- East end: NY 26 / NY 37 in Theresa

Location
- Country: United States
- State: New York
- Counties: Jefferson

Highway system
- New York Highways; Interstate; US; State; Reference; Parkways
← NY 410	→ NY 412

New York State Route 411 (NY 411) is an east–west state highway in Jefferson County, New York, in the United States. The western terminus of the route is at an intersection with NY 180 in the community of La Fargeville in the town of Orleans. Its eastern terminus is at a junction with NY 37 in the adjacent town of Theresa just west of the village of Theresa.

== Route description ==
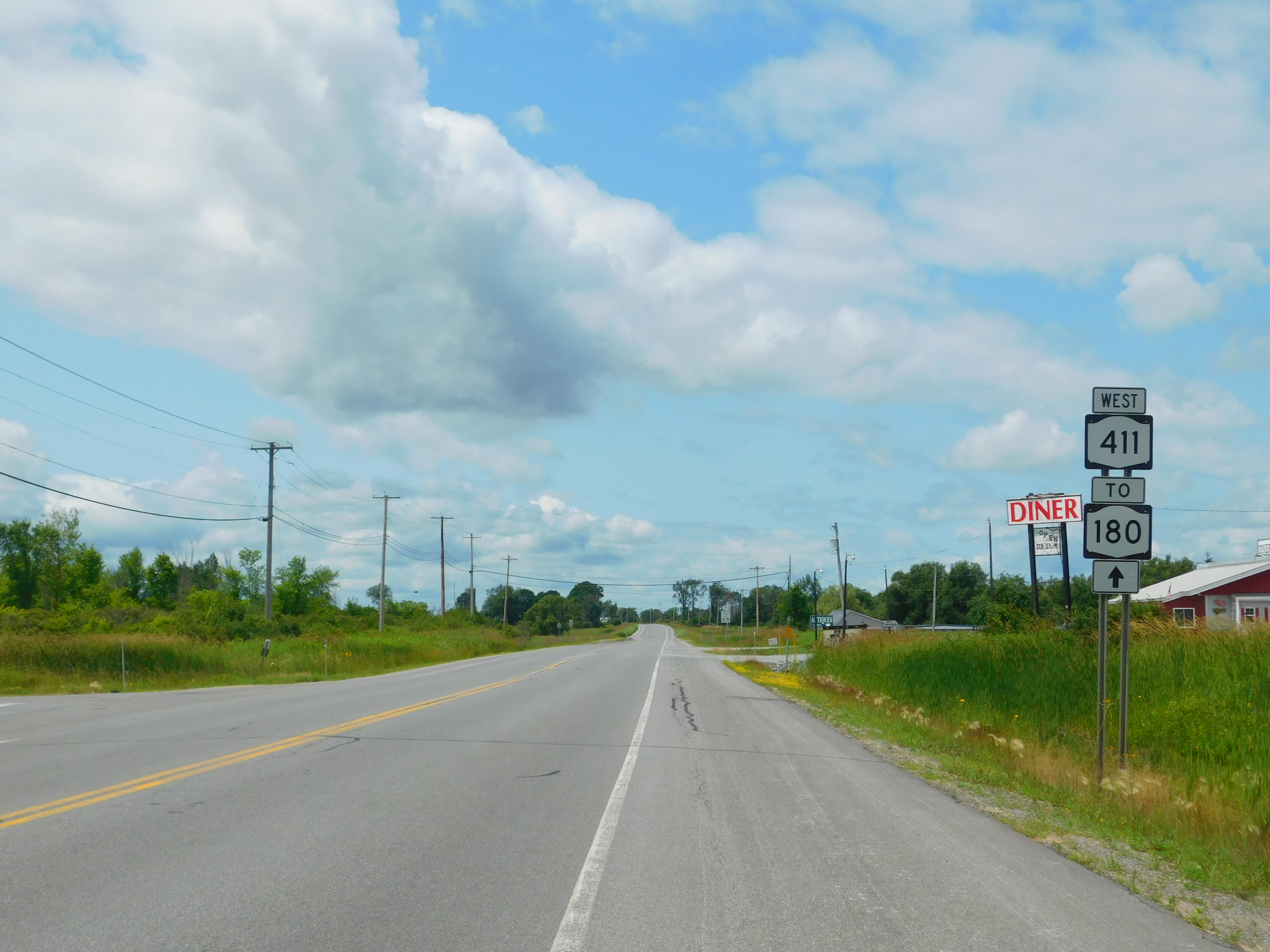
NY 411 westbound in Orleans

NY 411 begins at an intersection with NY 180 (Main and Clayton Streets) in the hamlet of La Fargeville (within the town of Orleans). NY 411 proceeds north on Main Street as a two-lane residential street through La Fargeville. The route quickly bends westward along Plank Road, passing south of Can-Am Speedway as a two-lane rural roadway through Orleans. NY 411 crosses over the Chaumont River as the route bends southeast into the hamlet of Orleans Corners. In Orleans Corners, NY 411 passes several homes and through an intersection with County Route 15 (CR 15; Jack Street Road). After leaving Orleans Four Corners, NY 411 proceeds east along Plank Road and into a diamond interchange with I-81 (exit 49).

After I-81, NY 411 crosses into the town of Theresa, dropping the Plank Road moniker. NY 411 bends northeast through Theresa as a two-lane rural roadway, crossing several intersections at-grade before bending eastward into an intersection with NY 26 and NY 37. This intersection serves as the eastern terminus of NY 411, whose right-of-way continues east as part of NY 26 into the village of Theresa.

== History ==
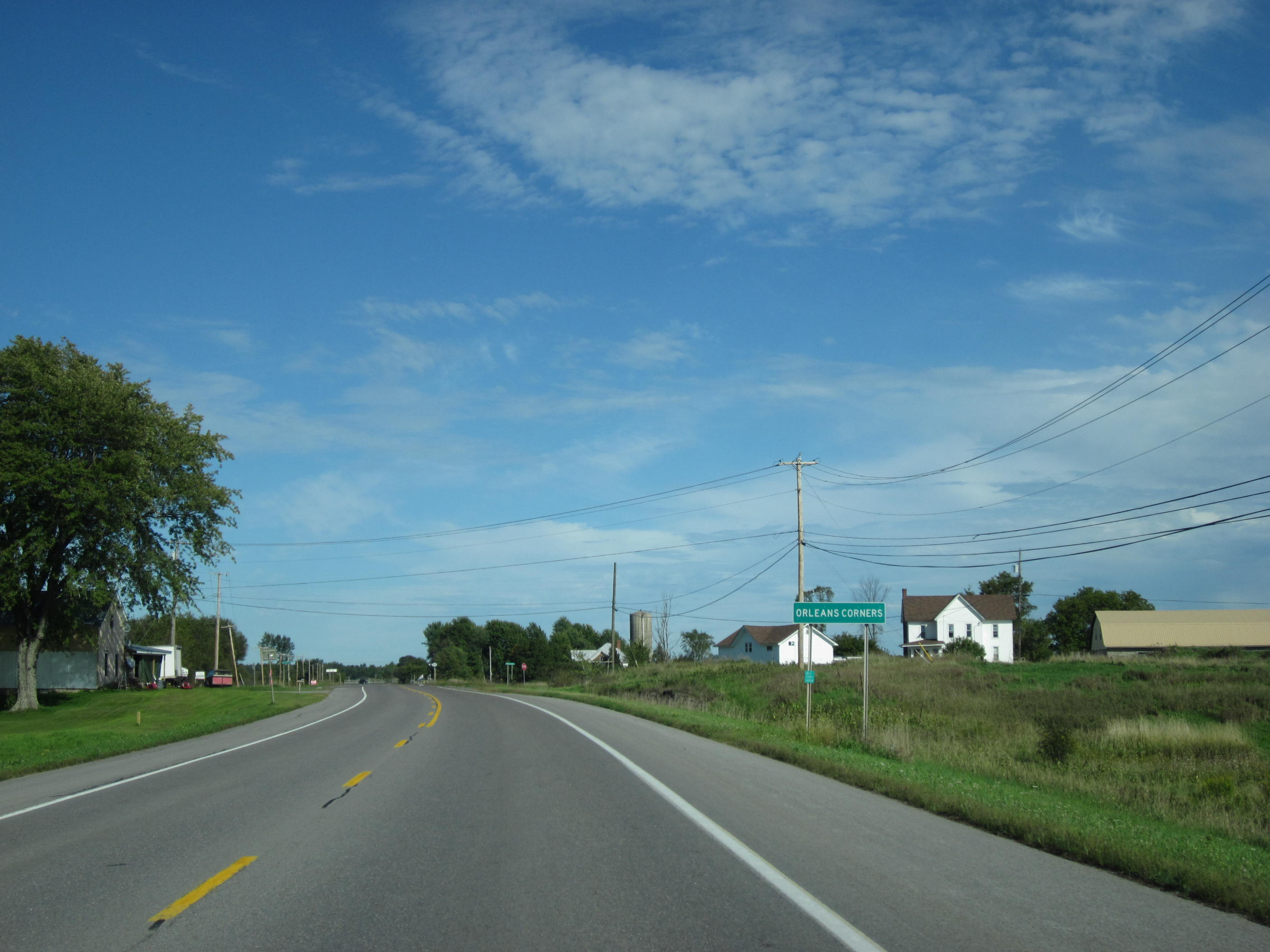
NY 411 eastbound entering the hamlet of Orleans Corners

NY 411 was assigned as part of the 1930 renumbering of state highways in New York to a highway connecting NY 26 in the village of Theresa to U.S. Route 11 in the village of Philadelphia. Farther west, a highway linking the villages of Clayton (at NY 12) at and Theresa (NY 37) via the hamlet of La Fargeville was designated as NY 181. The NY 181 designation was short-lived as it was removed c. 1939.

In the mid-1960s, the portion of I-81 north of Watertown opened to traffic. One of the interchanges along the new highway was located east of La Fargeville, where I-81 met NY 181's former routing. As a result, NY 411 was extended westward to La Fargeville over NY 181's former alignment. NY 411 became concurrent with NY 26 through Theresa and with NY 37 west of the village as part of the extension. NY 26 was truncated to West Carthage in the mid-1970s. Its former routing from Antwerp to Alexandria Bay was then redesignated as NY 283.

NY 411 remained unchanged until August 1, 1979, when ownership and maintenance of several highways in Jefferson County was transferred from Jefferson County to the state of New York and vice versa. As part of the swap, maintenance of NY 283's alignment west of Theresa and from Theresa to Antwerp was given to Jefferson County from the state in exchange for Lafargeville Road southwest of Theresa, among other highways. Following the swap, NY 26 was reextended north to Alexandria Bay; however, since its former alignment east of Theresa was now a county road, it was routed on the portion of NY 411 from Philadelphia to Theresa instead. As a result, NY 411 was truncated to the southern terminus of its overlap with NY 37 southwest of Theresa.

== Major intersections ==
The entire route is in Jefferson County.

Location	mi	km	Destinations	Notes
Town of Orleans	0.00	0.00	NY 180 (Main Street / Clayton Street)	Western terminus; hamlet of La Fargeville
Town of Orleans	4.50	7.24	I-81 – Canada, Watertown	Exit 172 (I-81)
Town of Theresa	7.55	12.15	NY 26 / NY 37 – Theresa, Gouverneur, Redwood, Ogdensburg, Watertown	Eastern terminus
1.000 mi = 1.609 km; 1.000 km = 0.621 mi
