= New York State Route 287 (1970s) =

Former highway in New York

New York State Route 287
- Map of Jefferson, Lewis, and St. Lawrence counties with NY 287 highlighted in red

Route information
- Maintained by NYSDOT
- Length: 2.84 mi (4.57 km)
- Existed: July 1, 1977–August 1, 1979

Major junctions
- West end: NY 283 in Alexandria
- East end: NY 37 in Alexandria

Location
- Country: United States
- State: New York
- Counties: Jefferson

Highway system
- New York Highways; Interstate; US; State; Reference; Parkways
← I-287	→ NY 288
← NY 26A	NY 26B	→ NY 27

New York State Route 287 (NY 287) was a state highway within the town of Alexandria in Jefferson County, New York, in the United States. The route served as a connector between NY 283 southeast of Alexandria Bay in the hamlet of Browns Corners and NY 37 in the hamlet of Redwood. It was 3 miles (5 km) long and passed through open fields for most of its length.

NY 287 was originally designated as part of NY 3 in 1924. In 1930, NY 3 was rerouted east of Watertown to follow a more southerly routing across the North Country. The Browns Corners–Redwood portion of its former alignment was redesignated as New York State Route 26B by the following year. NY 26, NY 26B's parent route, was truncated southward on July 1, 1977; as a result, NY 26B was redesignated as NY 287. In 1979, ownership and maintenance of NY 287 was transferred from the state of New York to Jefferson County as part of a highway maintenance swap between the two levels of government. The route is now designated as County Route 192 (CR 192).

== Route description ==
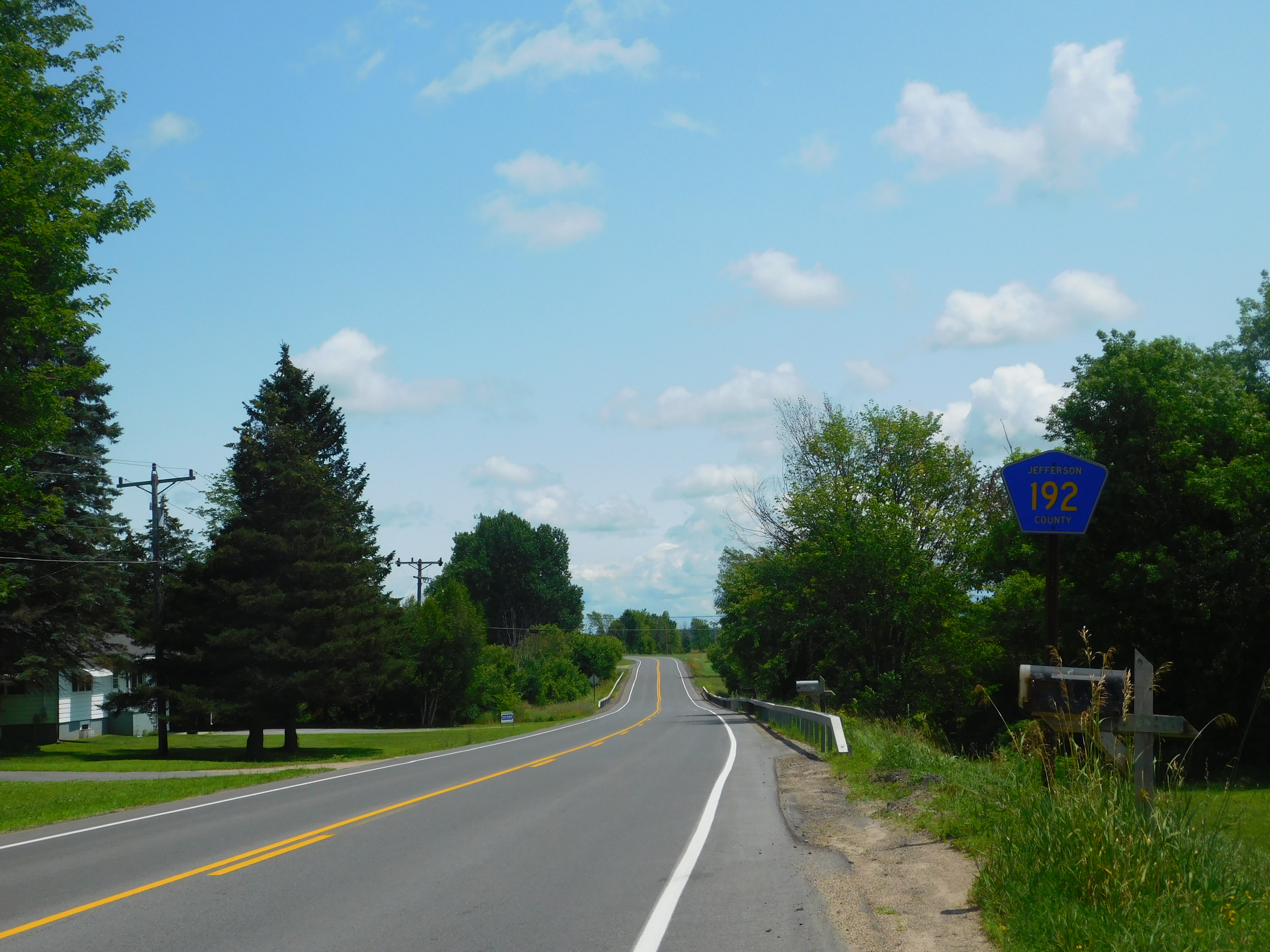
First eastbound reassurance marker on CR 192 (former NY 287) in Browns Corners

NY 287 began at an intersection with NY 283 southeast of Alexandria Bay in Browns Corners, a hamlet within the town of Alexandria. It headed southeast from the small community and gradually curved to the northeast as it proceeded through large, cultivated fields in an isolated portion of Jefferson County. West of Redwood, NY 287 had only four intersections with other highways, two of which were for a local road that began and ended at the state highway.

About 1 mile (1.6 km) outside of Redwood, NY 287 passed over Jewett Creek as it entered a small forest situated adjacent to the hamlet. On the opposite side of the forest, NY 287 entered Redwood, a small, residential community bordered to the south and east by Mud Lake and Butterfield Lake, respectively. It continued east for two blocks to a junction with NY 37 near the northern edge of the hamlet, where NY 287 ended.

== History ==
The east–west highway connecting Browns Corners to Redwood was originally designated as part of Route 27, an unsigned legislative route, by the New York State Legislature on March 1, 1921. When the first set of posted routes in New York were assigned in 1924, all of legislative Route 27 northeast of Clayton became part of NY 3. NY 3, a cross-state highway that began in Erie County and ended in Clinton County, entered Browns Corners on modern NY 26 and left Redwood on what is now NY 37. In the 1930 renumbering of state highways in New York, NY 3 was rerouted east of Watertown to follow a more southerly routing across the North Country. The Browns Corners–Redwood portion of its former alignment was designated as NY 26B by the following year. It connected to its parent, NY 26, at its west end.

On July 1, 1977, NY 26 was truncated southward to Carthage to eliminate 36 miles (58 km) of overlaps with other routes. All of NY 26's former routing north of Antwerp was renumbered to NY 283 while NY 26B was redesignated as NY 287. The NY 287 designation proved to be short-lived, however, as ownership and maintenance of the route was transferred from the state of New York to Jefferson County on August 1, 1979, as part of a highway maintenance swap between the two levels of government. NY 287 was subsequently redesignated as CR 192.

== Major intersections ==
The entire route was in Alexandria, Jefferson County.

mi	km	Destinations	Notes
0.00	0.00	NY 283	Hamlet of Browns Corners
2.84	4.57	NY 37	Hamlet of Redwood
1.000 mi = 1.609 km; 1.000 km = 0.621 mi

== See also ==
- List of county routes in Jefferson County, New York
