= New York State Route 126 =

Highway in New York

New York State Route 126
- NY 126 highlighted in red

Route information
- Maintained by NYSDOT
- Length: 28.56 mi (45.96 km)
- Existed: July 1, 1977–present

Major junctions
- West end: NY 12 at the Watertown city–town line
- NY 26 in West Carthage
- East end: NY 812 in Croghan

Location
- Country: United States
- State: New York
- Counties: Jefferson, Lewis

Highway system
- New York Highways; Interstate; US; State; Reference; Parkways
← NY 125	→ NY 127
← NY 26	NY 26A	→ NY 26B

New York State Route 126 (NY 126) is a 28.56-mile-long (45.96 km) state highway in the North Country of New York in the United States. It proceeds in a roughly northwest to southeast direction between NY 12 at the eastern city line of Watertown in central Jefferson County and NY 812 in the village of Croghan in northern Lewis County. In between, NY 126 serves the adjacent villages of West Carthage and Carthage, where the route has overlaps with NY 3 (in Carthage) and NY 26 (in West Carthage). Most of the route passes through rural areas, and the portion southeast of Carthage parallels either the Black River or a tributary of it.

The portion of NY 126 between Carthage and Croghan was originally part of New York State Route 26A (NY 26A), an alternate route of NY 26 assigned as part of the 1930 renumbering of state highways in New York. It began at NY 26 in Lowville and passed through Croghan before ending at NY 3 and NY 26 in Carthage. At the time, the section of what is now NY 126 from Broad Street in West Carthage to James Street in Carthage was part of NY 26.

NY 26A ceased to exist on July 1, 1974 when it was replaced by two new routes: NY 126 northwest of Croghan and NY 812 south of the village. In 1979, the state of New York acquired two county roads leading from West Carthage—one connecting to Evans Mills and another that went to Watertown—as part of a highway maintenance swap between the state and Jefferson County. NY 26 was realigned to follow the new state highway leading to Evans Mills, while NY 126 was extended westward to its current terminus in Watertown by way of NY 26's original routing through Carthage and West Carthage and the newly acquired highway linking West Carthage and Watertown.

== Route description ==
=== Jefferson County ===
NY 126 begins at an intersection with NY 12 located on the eastern city line of Watertown. The route heads east, passing through a predominantly residential area of the town of Watertown. Roughly 1 mile (1.6 km) east of NY 12, the homes give way to open fields as the route enters the town of Rutland. Within Rutland, NY 126 serves only the small, rural hamlets of Rutland Center and Harpers Ferry before passing into the town of Champion. 3 miles (5 km) into Champion, NY 126 enters the hamlet of the same name, situated at the junction of NY 126 and County Route 47. NY 126 passes east–west through the center of the small, mostly residential community before turning to the northeast as it leaves the hamlet.

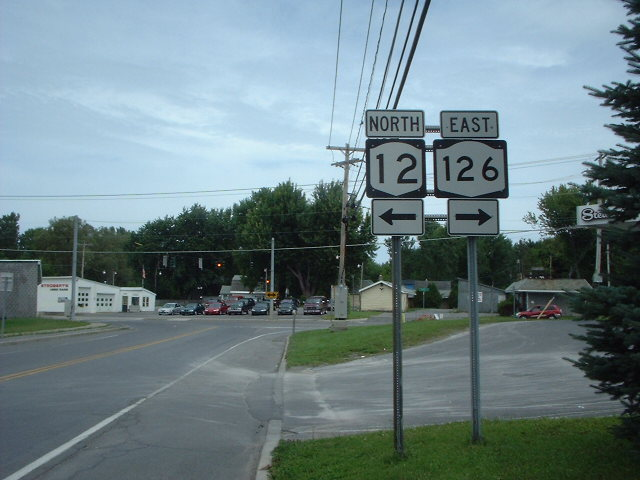
Western terminus of NY 126 at NY 12 in Watertown

The route continues onward through open fields to the village of West Carthage, where it becomes known as Champion Street and meets NY 26 west of the village center at Martin and North Broad Streets. NY 126 turns south onto North Broad Street, overlapping NY 26 south for four blocks through the mostly commercial western fringe of the village to Bridge Street. The two routes split here, with NY 26 continuing south out of the village on South Broad Street and NY 126 proceeding northeast through residential portions of the village on Bridge Street. At the northeast edge of West Carthage, NY 126 crosses the Black River and enters the adjacent village of Carthage on the opposite bank, where NY 126 changes names to State Street.

The first three blocks of NY 126 within Carthage are located in a commercial neighborhood; however, the businesses give way to homes at School Street, which carries NY 3 into the village from the northwest. NY 3 turns onto State Street here, overlapping NY 126 for one block to James Street. Here, NY 3 continues northeast on State Street while NY 126 turns southeast onto James Street. Although NY 126 exits the village and enters the town of Wilna near Cemetery Street, homes continue to line the highway up to the point where NY 126 begins to follow the eastern bank of the Black River. The route exits Jefferson County and enters Lewis County roughly 0.25 miles (0.40 km) later.

=== Lewis County ===
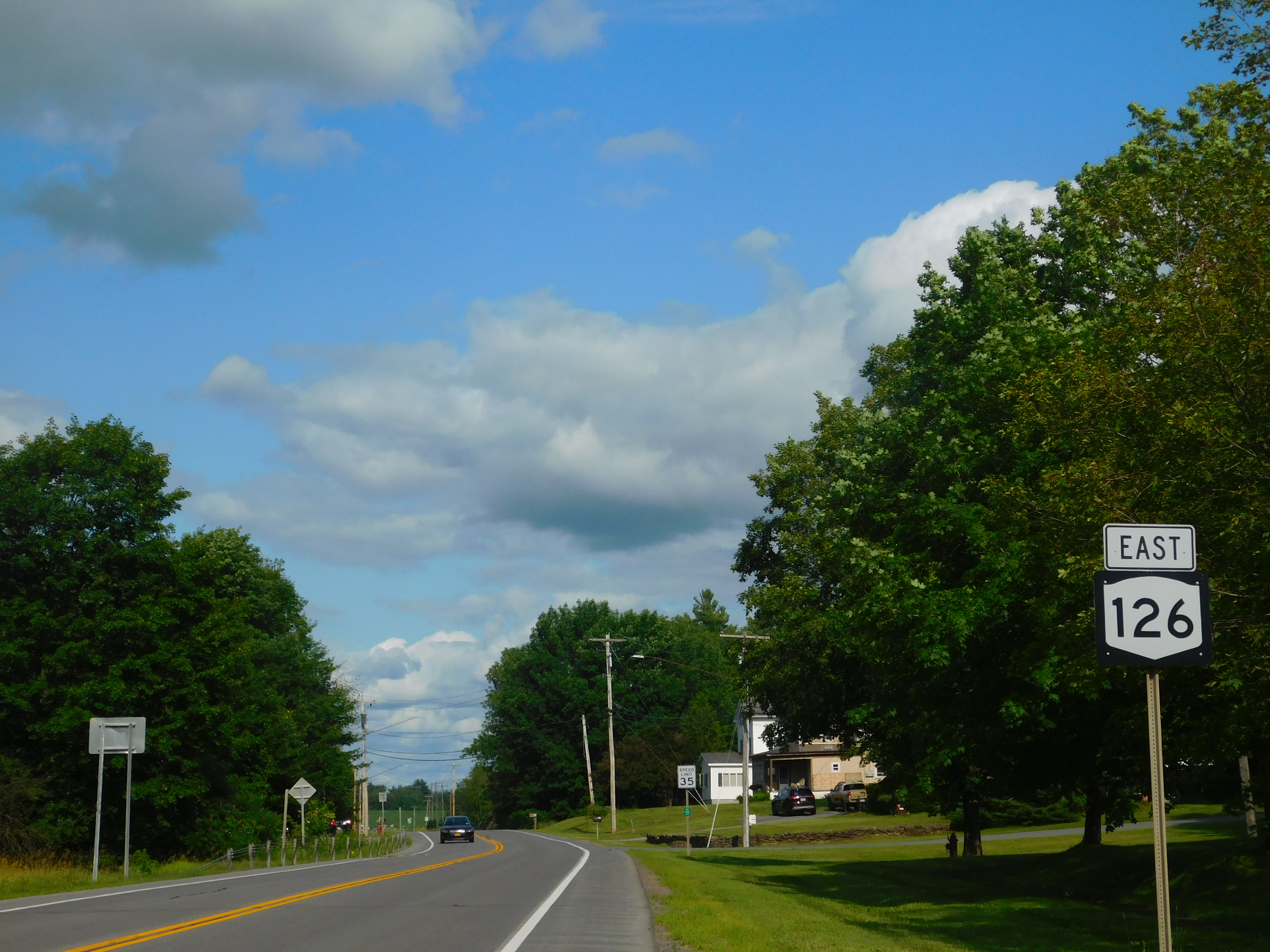
NY 126 east in Beaver Falls

Now in the town of Croghan, NY 126 becomes a rural connector highway once again as it runs in close proximity to the Black River. The two separate about 2 miles (3.2 km) south of the county line as NY 126 leaves the riverbank and follows a more northeasterly routing than the river through the town. NY 126 parallels the waterway to the hamlet of Naumburg, located near the point where the Beaver River merges with the Black River. NY 126 intersects NY 410 in the center of the hamlet.

East of Naumburg, NY 126 follows the north bank of the Beaver River as it proceeds through rural Croghan. About 3 miles (5 km) from Naumburg, NY 126 crosses the river and enters the hamlet of Beaver Falls, a large community situated on the river. NY 126 bypasses most of the hamlet, however, as it runs through the lightly populated southern part of Beaver Falls instead of the more densely populated half on the north riverbank. Past Beaver Falls, NY 126 leaves the Beaver River and heads through fields and small forested areas to the village of Croghan, where the highway is named Shady Avenue. The route continues as a residential street for two blocks to a junction with NY 812 just south of the village center, where NY 126 ends.

== History ==
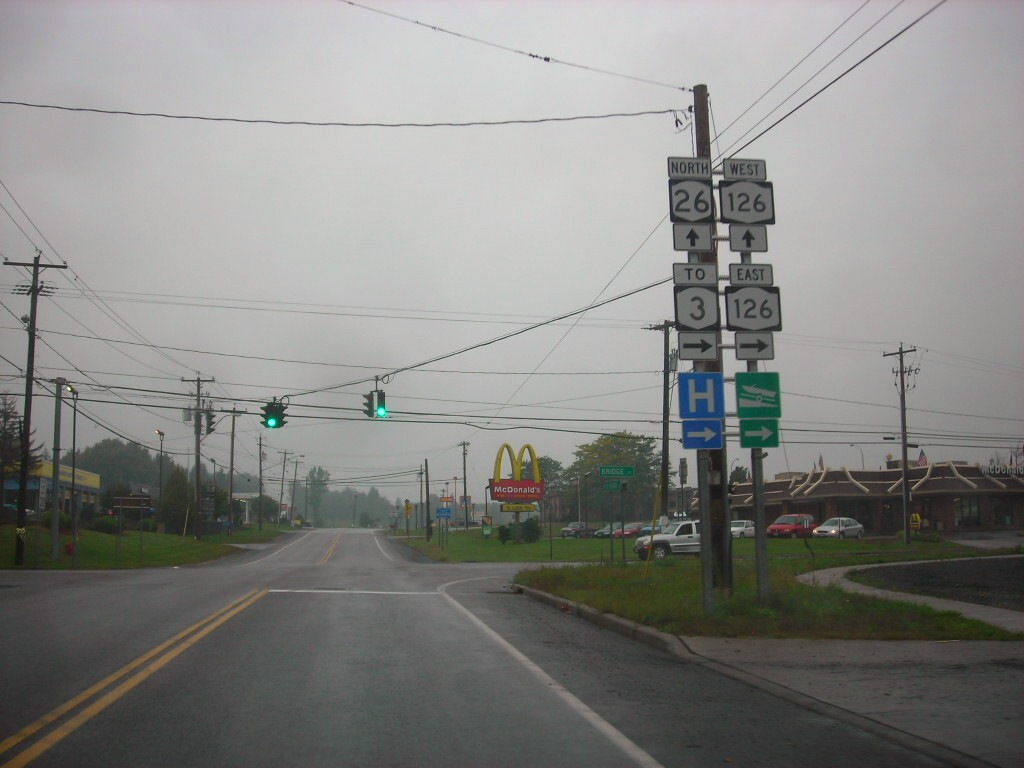
Southern terminus of NY 126's overlap with NY 26 in West Carthage. NY 26 originally turned right at this junction and followed modern NY 126 into Carthage.

The origins of NY 126 date back to the 1930 renumbering of state highways in New York, when an alternate routing of NY 26 between Lowville and Carthage was designated as NY 26A. While NY 26 went directly between the two villages, NY 26A went northeast from Lowville to Croghan before turning northwest and paralleling NY 26 to Carthage, where it ended at State Street (NY 3). At the time, NY 26A also ended at NY 26, which initially passed through Carthage and Antwerp on its way from West Carthage to Theresa. In West Carthage and Carthage, NY 26 followed Bridge and State Streets, resulting in an overlap with NY 3 through eastern Carthage.

The portion of NY 26 between Carthage and Antwerp was rerouted in 1960 to follow a new alignment via Calcium, part of which used a new state highway northeast of Watertown. NY 26A may have been extended southwestward along State Street for one block to meet NY 26 as a result. NY 26 was truncated southward in the mid-1970s to the junction of State and School Streets, which had been the southern terminus of its overlap with NY 3 since 1960. On July 1, 1974, NY 26A was supplanted by two new routes: NY 126, which was assigned to the Carthage–Croghan segment of NY 26A, and NY 812, which extended from Lowville to Ogdensburg via Croghan.

On August 1, 1979, the state of New York assumed ownership and maintenance of two county-maintained highways leading from West Carthage as part of a highway maintenance swap between the state and Jefferson County. One connected West Carthage to Evans Mills and became part of a re-extended NY 26; the other led from West Carthage to NY 12 in Watertown. The Watertown–West Carthage highway became part of an extended NY 126, which reached the new state highway by way of an overlap with NY 26 along North Broad Street in West Carthage and the former routing of NY 26 along Bridge and State Streets in West Carthage and Carthage.

== Major intersections ==
County	Location	mi	km	Destinations	Notes
Jefferson	Watertown–Watertown city/town line	0.00	0.00	NY 12 (State Street / Gifford Street) – Lowville, Utica	Western terminus
Jefferson	West Carthage	12.86	20.70	NY 26 north (Martin Street Road) – Great Bend	Western end of NY 26 concurrency
Jefferson	West Carthage	13.64	21.95	NY 26 south (South Broad Street) – Lowville	Eastern end of NY 26 concurrency
Jefferson	Carthage	14.77	23.77	NY 3 west (North School Street)	Western end of NY 3 concurrency
Jefferson	Carthage	14.85	23.90	NY 3 east (State Street)	Eastern end of NY 3 concurrency
Lewis	Town of Croghan	23.02	37.05	NY 410 west – Naumburg, Castorland	Hamlet of Naumburg; eastern terminus of NY 410
Lewis	Village of Croghan	28.56	45.96	NY 812 (Main Street) – Harrisville, Lowville	Eastern terminus
1.000 mi = 1.609 km; 1.000 km = 0.621 mi: Concurrency terminus
