= New Bremen =

New Bremen can refer to:

- New Bremen, New York
- New Bremen, Ohio
