= Mud Lake (Jefferson County, New York) =

- Location within New York Mud Lake (the United States)
- Location: Jefferson County, New York, United States
- Coordinates: 44°17′30″N 75°48′33″W
- Type: Lake
- Primary inflows: Crystal Lake
- Primary outflows: Butterfield Lake
- Basin countries: United States
- Surface area: 220 acres (0.89 km^{2})
- Average depth: 6 feet (1.8 m)
- Max. depth: 17 feet (5.2 m)
- Shore length^{1}: 3.9 miles (6.3 km)
- Surface elevation: 354 feet (108 m)
- Islands: 2
- Settlements: Redwood, New York
- ^{1} Shore length is not a well-defined measure.

Mud Lake is located near Redwood, New York. The water from adjacent Crystal Lake flows into Mud Lake and the outlet flows into Butterfield Lake. Fish species present in the lake are northern pike, yellow perch, brown bullhead, and bluegill. There is only carry-down boat access on this lake.
