= New York State Route 410 =

State highway in Lewis County, New York, US

New York State Route 410
- Map of Jefferson and Lewis counties with NY 410 highlighted in red

Route information
- Maintained by NYSDOT
- Length: 3.97 mi (6.39 km)
- Existed: 1930–present

Major junctions
- West end: NY 26 in Denmark
- East end: NY 126 in Croghan

Location
- Country: United States
- State: New York
- Counties: Lewis

Highway system
- New York Highways; Interstate; US; State; Reference; Parkways
← NY 409	→ NY 411

New York State Route 410 (NY 410) is a 4-mile (6.4 km) east–west state highway in Lewis County, New York, in the United States. It serves as a connector between NY 26, NY 126, and the village of Castorland midway between the two highways. The route begins at an intersection with NY 26 in the town of Denmark and heads northeast through Castorland and across the Black River to a junction with NY 126 in the town of Croghan. Most of the route passes through open, rural areas, save for the section within Castorland. NY 410 was assigned as part of the 1930 renumbering of state highways in New York even though the road had yet to be improved to state highway standards. Work on rebuilding the road was delayed by the state for years, leading the Kiwanis Club of Lowville to pressure the state to reconstruct the highway. The route was finally brought up to state highway standards in the latter part of the 1930s.

== Route description ==
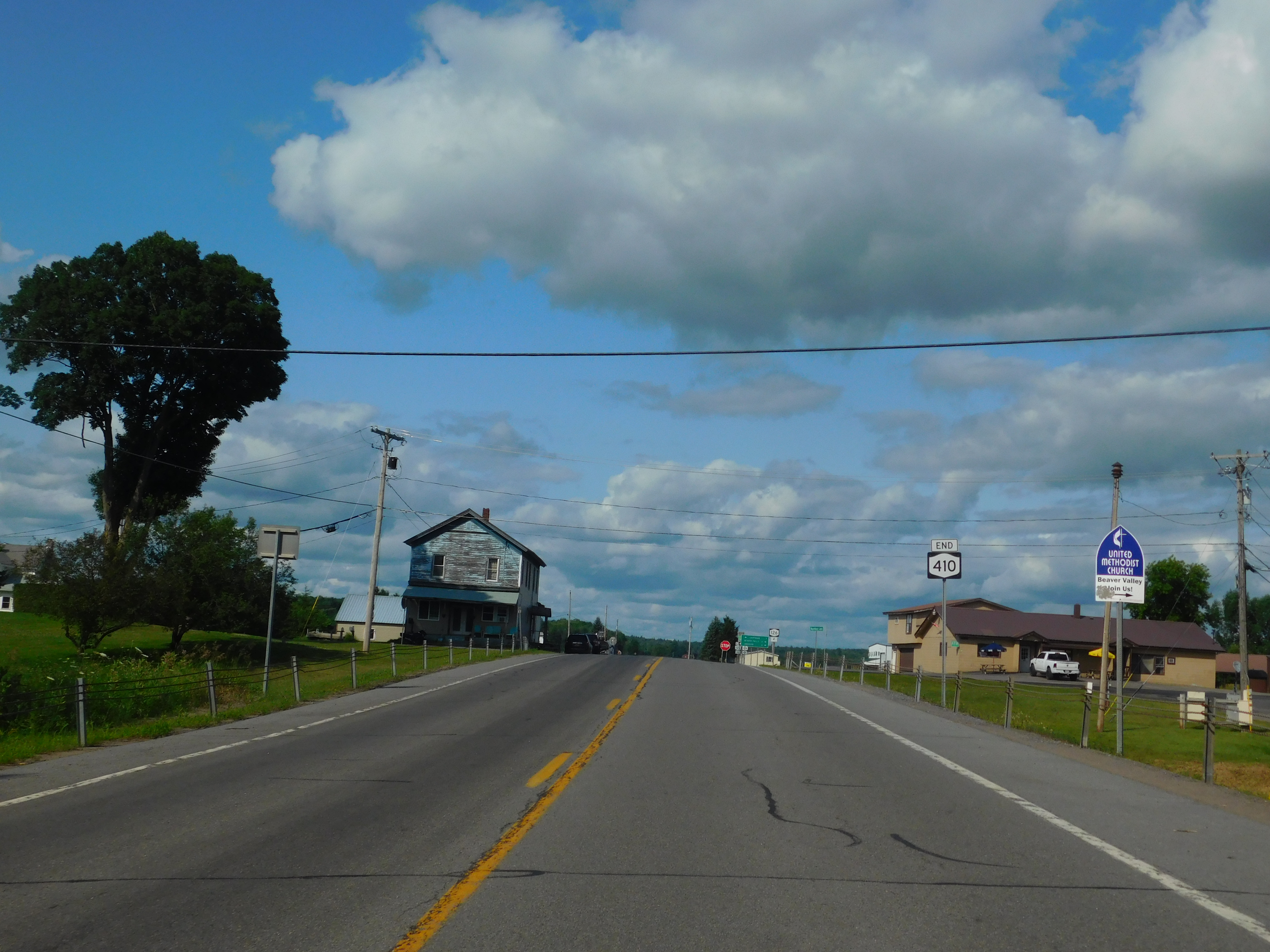
NY 410 eastbound in Naumburg, approaching NY 126

NY 410 begins at a rural intersection with NY 26 in the town of Denmark. The two-lane route heads eastward from the junction, winding to the north and south across open, rolling terrain with several cultivated fields. After 1 mile (1.6 km), the highway meets County Route 19 (CR 19, named East Road) and turns to the northeast toward the village of Castorland. The open fields gradually give way to homes as NY 410 enters the village limits as Main Street. The route passes through the center of the village, serving four lightly developed residential blocks before crossing the Mohawk, Adirondack and Northern Railroad at the northeastern edge of the community. At the rail crossing, the highway passes south of what was once the New York Central Railroad's Castorland passenger station.

Outside of Castorland, the road runs across a half-mile (0.8 km) stretch of undeveloped land prior to crossing the Black River, which serves as the boundary between the towns of Denmark and Croghan. On the opposite riverbank, NY 410 continues across another open stretch to reach the small hamlet of Naumburg. Here, the route passes a handful of homes and intersects the north end of CR 33 (Van Amber Road) before ending at an intersection with NY 126 on the northeastern fringe of the hamlet. While NY 410 terminates at this junction, its right-of-way continues past NY 126 as Cross Road, a local highway connecting Naumburg to CR 8 (Second Road).

== History ==
In 1925, the state of New York approved plans to establish a state highway between Kitts Corners—a point just south of the modern junction of NY 26 and NY 410—and Naumburg. The existing road between the two points via Castorland was designated as NY 410 as part of the 1930 renumbering of state highways in New York; however, it remained an unimproved, locally maintained highway through the mid-1930s. In early 1934, the Kiwanis Club of nearby Lowville began to petition the state to follow through on its plans to rebuild the road as the organization considered the proposed Kitts Corners–Naumburg state highway to be "of the greatest importance to the business interests of the villages of Beaver Falls, Castorland, and Lowville".

The Lowville Kiwanis Club took action again in early 1935, sending a representative to a hearing in Lake Placid to meet with State Senator George R. Fearon, the chairman of a committee tasked with developing a long-term plan for state highway construction in New York. At the meeting, Kiwanis member Arthur W. Mattson noted that the village of Castorland had paved every street in the village limits save for Main Street, which was left as a dirt road due to the state's long-standing intention to take it over and rebuild it. In October 1935, the state unveiled plans to reconstruct the portion of NY 410 leading west from the center of Castorland as a concrete road. The survey and design work for the segment was already complete, which would allow construction to begin in 1936 if funding was made available by that time.

Work on the project was finally underway by July 1936. While most of the existing road west of Castorland was improved in place, the westernmost part (now known as Haser Road) was bypassed in favor of a new alignment to the north. The change in NY 410's course took the highway around a steep grade that existed along the original route at Kitts Corners. The scope of the project ended at the New York Central Railroad tracks in Castorland as the part of NY 410 leading to Naumburg had been contracted out as part of a different project, which had already been completed by this time. The reconstruction of the rest of NY 410 was finished in the late 1930s. The original bridge carrying NY 410 over the Black River was replaced with a 640-foot (195 m) structure in 1955. It was reconstructed nine years later.

== Major intersections ==
The entire route is in Lewis County.

Location	mi	km	Destinations	Notes
Town of Denmark	0.00	0.00	NY 26 – Lowville, Carthage	Western terminus
Town of Croghan	3.97	6.39	NY 126 – Carthage, Beaver Falls, Croghan	Eastern terminus; hamlet of Naumburg
1.000 mi = 1.609 km; 1.000 km = 0.621 mi
