= Crystal Lake (Theresa, Jefferson County, New York) =

- Location within New York Crystal Lake (the United States)
- Location: Jefferson County, New York, United States
- Coordinates: 44°16′28″N 75°47′57″W
- Type: Lake
- Primary outflows: Mud Lake
- Basin countries: United States
- Surface area: 95 acres (0.38 km^{2})
- Average depth: 21 feet (6.4 m)
- Max. depth: 40 feet (12 m)
- Shore length^{1}: 2.3 miles (3.7 km)
- Surface elevation: 374 feet (114 m)
- Settlements: Redwood, New York
- ^{1} Shore length is not a well-defined measure.

Crystal Lake is located near Redwood, New York. The outlet flows into Mud Lake. Fish species present in the lake are northern pike, largemouth bass, walleye, yellow perch, rock bass, and bluegill. There is only carry-down boat access on this lake and there is a fee.
