= New Bremen, New York =

- Town
- Location within New York Location within the United States
- Coordinates: 43°51′10″N 75°22′20″W
- Country: United States
- State: New York
- County: Lewis

Area
  - Total: 55.79 sq mi (144.49 km^{2})
  - Land: 55.59 sq mi (143.97 km^{2})
  - Water: 0.20 sq mi (0.52 km^{2})
- Elevation: 920 ft (280 m)

Population (2010)
  - Total: 2,706
  - Estimate (2016): 2,692
  - Density: 48/sq mi (18.7/km^{2})
- Time zone: UTC-5 (Eastern (EST))
  - Summer (DST): UTC-4 (EDT)
- ZIP Codes: 13367 (Lowville); 13327 (Croghan); 13305 (Beaver Falls); 13620 (Castorland)
- FIPS code: 36-049-50001
- GNIS feature ID: 979257
- Website: www.townofnewbremen.gov

New Bremen is a town in Lewis County, New York, United States. The population was 2,785 at the 2020 census. The town is named after the German city of Bremen.

The town is on the eastern side of the county. It is northeast of Lowville, the county seat.

== History ==
The first settlement was c. 1798. Many later settlers were from Germany. The community of New Bremen was laid out in 1826 by Charles Dayan.

The town of New Bremen was formed in 1848 from parts of the towns of Croghan and Watson.

== Geography ==
According to the United States Census Bureau, the town has a total area of 55.8 square miles (145 km^{2}), of which 55.6 square miles (144 km^{2}) are land and 0.2 square miles (0.52 km^{2}), or 0.36%, are water.

New York State Route 812, a north–south highway, intersects New York State Route 126, an east–west highway, near the northern town line.

The western town boundary is defined by the Black River. The Beaver River, a tributary of the Black River, marks the northeastern town line.

== Demographics ==
Historical population
Census	Pop.	Note	%±
1850	1,510		—
1860	1,786		18.3%
1870	1,908		6.8%
1880	2,414		26.5%
1890	1,974		−18.2%
1900	1,775		−10.1%
1910	1,609		−9.4%
1920	1,609		0.0%
1930	1,597		−0.7%
1940	1,707		6.9%
1950	1,729		1.3%
1960	1,963		13.5%
1970	2,040		3.9%
1980	2,316		13.5%
1990	2,526		9.1%
2000	2,722		7.8%
2010	2,706		−0.6%
2016 (est.)	2,692		−0.5%
U.S. Decennial Census

As of the census of 2000, there were 2,722 people, 945 households, and 757 families residing in the town. The population density was 49.0 inhabitants per square mile (18.9/km^{2}). There were 1,116 housing units at an average density of 20.1 per square mile (7.8/km^{2}). The racial makeup of the town was 98.09% White, 0.77% African American, 0.29% Native American, 0.18% Asian, 0.07% Pacific Islander, 0.15% from other races, and 0.44% from two or more races. Hispanic or Latino of any race were 0.33% of the population.

There were 945 households, out of which 40.7% had children under the age of 18 living with them, 67.7% were married couples living together, 8.1% had a female householder with no husband present, and 19.8% were non-families. 16.1% of all households were made up of individuals, and 7.4% had someone living alone who was 65 years of age or older. The average household size was 2.88 and the average family size was 3.24.

In the town, the population was spread out, with 30.3% under the age of 18, 7.8% from 18 to 24, 29.1% from 25 to 44, 21.6% from 45 to 64, and 11.3% who were 65 years of age or older. The median age was 35 years. For every 100 females, there were 94.6 males. For every 100 females age 18 and over, there were 97.1 males.

The median income for a household in the town was $35,230, and the median income for a family was $37,841. Males had a median income of $29,881 versus $21,149 for females. The per capita income for the town was $14,196. About 8.8% of families and 11.1% of the population were below the poverty line, including 13.8% of those under age 18 and 13.6% of those age 65 or over.

== Communities and locations in New Bremen ==
- Bushs Corners – A location east of Kirschnerville.
- Croghan – A small part of the Village of Croghan is at the northern town line on NY-812 and the Beaver River.
- Crystal Dale – A hamlet in the southeastern part of the town.
- Duflo Airport (NY10) – A private airport northeast of New Bremen village.
- Kirschnerville – A hamlet in the northeastern part of the town.
- New Bremen (formerly " Dayansville") – The hamlet of New Bremen is located in the western part of the town and on NY-812.
