= Champion, New York =

- Town
- Location within New York Location within the United States
- Coordinates: 43°58′N 75°41′W
- Country: United States
- State: New York
- County: Jefferson

Government
  - Type: Town Council
  - Town Supervisor: John D.Peck (R)
  - Town Council: Members' List: • Brad Russell (R); • William McMahon (R); • Brian Sech(R); • JD Uhlinger III (R)

Area
  - Total: 45.00 sq mi (116.56 km^{2})
  - Land: 44.13 sq mi (114.29 km^{2})
  - Water: 0.87 sq mi (2.26 km^{2})
- Elevation: 968 ft (295 m)

Population (2010)
  - Total: 4,494
  - Estimate (2016): 4,458
  - Density: 100/sq mi (39/km^{2})
- Time zone: UTC-5 (Eastern (EST))
  - Summer (DST): UTC-4 (EDT)
- ZIP Codes: 13619 (Carthage); 13643 (Great Bend); 13612 (Black River); 13626 (Copenhagen); 13601 (Watertown); 13602 (Fort Drum)
- Area code: 315
- FIPS code: 36-045-13717
- GNIS feature ID: 0978808
- Website: townofchampionny.gov

Champion is a town in Jefferson County, New York, United States. The population was 4,494 at the 2010 census. The town is named after General Henry Champion, early owner.

The town is on the eastern edge of the county and is east of Watertown.

== History ==
Settlement began around 1798. Henry Champion purchased the lands and sent his surveyor Noadiah Hubbard to the land. Hubbard settled in the area where his homestead still exists today.

The town was the birthplace of George E. Spencer (1836-1893), a Union general in the Civil War who later served two terms as a U.S. senator from Alabama.

Champion was established in 1800 from part of the town of Mexico (now in Oswego County) before the county was created. The town was named after Henry Champion, who in return commissioned a bell for the town church. In 1803, part of the town was used to establish part of the town of Harrisburg (now in Lewis County). Early settlers hoped the town would become the locale for the county seat, but were disappointed.

The community of West Carthage incorporated as a village in 1889.

The Hiram Hubbard House was added to the National Register of Historic Places in 2012.

== Geography ==
According to the United States Census Bureau, the town has a total area of 45.1 square miles (116.7 km^{2}), of which 44.2 square miles (114.4 km^{2}) are land and 0.89 square miles (2.3 km^{2}), or 1.97%, are water.

The Black River flows along the town's northern boundary. The southeastern town line is the border of Lewis County.

New York State Route 126 is an east-west highway in the town. New York State Route 3, a major east-west highway in the northern part of Champion, intersects north-south New York State Route 26 at Great Bend.

== Demographics ==
Historical population
Census	Pop.	Note	%±
1820	2,080		—
1830	2,342		12.6%
1840	2,206		−5.8%
1850	2,085		−5.5%
1860	2,132		2.3%
1870	2,156		1.1%
1880	2,259		4.8%
1890	2,191		−3.0%
1900	2,525		15.2%
1910	2,704		7.1%
1920	2,854		5.5%
1930	3,001		5.2%
1940	3,103		3.4%
1950	3,499		12.8%
1960	3,878		10.8%
1970	4,371		12.7%
1980	4,056		−7.2%
1990	4,574		12.8%
2000	4,361		−4.7%
2010	4,494		3.0%
2016 (est.)	4,458		−0.8%
U.S. Decennial Census

As of the census of 2000, there were 4,361 people, 1,675 households, and 1,190 families residing in the town. The population density was 98.4 inhabitants per square mile (38.0/km^{2}). There were 1,906 housing units at an average density of 43.0 per square mile (16.6/km^{2}). The racial makeup of the town was 92.85% White, 2.75% African American, 0.62% Native American, 1.05% Asian, 0.14% Pacific Islander, 0.89% from other races, and 1.70% from two or more races. Hispanic or Latino of any race were 2.89% of the population.

There were 1,675 households, out of which 36.5% had children under the age of 18 living with them, 59.0% were married couples living together, 8.6% had a female householder with no husband present, and 28.9% were non-families. 23.9% of all households were made up of individuals, and 11.6% had someone living alone who was 65 years of age or older. The average household size was 2.60 and the average family size was 3.06.

In the town, the population was spread out, with 27.8% under the age of 18, 8.8% from 18 to 24, 30.2% from 25 to 44, 21.1% from 45 to 64, and 12.2% who were 65 years of age or older. The median age was 35 years. For every 100 females, there were 93.1 males. For every 100 females age 18 and over, there were 93.8 males.

The median income for a household in the town was $34,875, and the median income for a family was $41,415. Males had a median income of $35,093 versus $21,386 for females. The per capita income for the town was $15,951. About 7.6% of families and 10.5% of the population were below the poverty line, including 12.0% of those under age 18 and 8.2% of those age 65 or over.

== Communities and locations in Champion ==
- Champion – A hamlet west of West Carthage village, located on NY-126.
- Champion Hill – The 1954 birthplace of local TV for the Kingston-Watertown market; see WWNY-TV and WPBS-TV.
- Champion Huddle – A location north of Champion village, located on Huddle Creek and County Road 47.
- Fort Drum – A small part of the military reservation is in the northernmost part of town, by the Black River.
- Great Bend – A hamlet and census-designated place on the Black River in the northern part of the town on NY-3 and NY-26.
- Huddle Creek – A stream flowing northward past Champion village and Champion Huddle.
- Pleasant Lake – A lake by the southern town line.
- West Carthage – A village on the eastern border of the town by the Black River and NY-26.

== Notable people ==
- Ellen Alida Rose (1843–?), agriculturist, suffragist
- George E. Spencer (1836-1893), U.S. senator from the state of Alabama
