= Ellen Alida Rose =

American agriculturist, suffragist

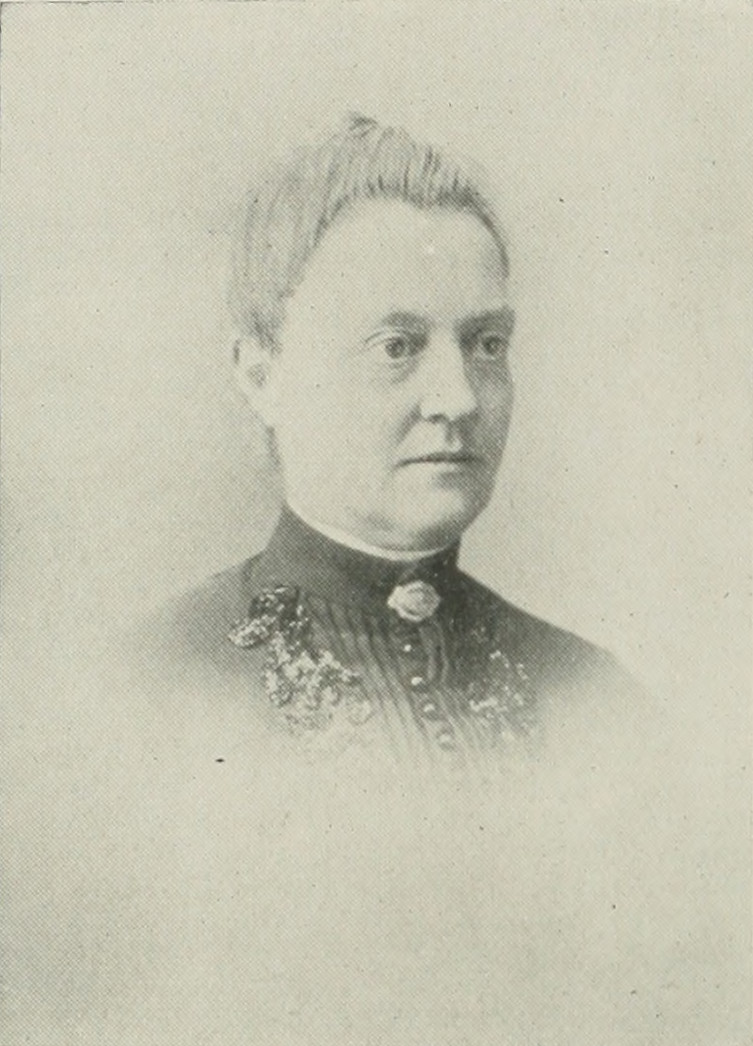
Ellen Alida Rose, "A woman"

Ellen Alida Rose (born June 17, 1843) was an American practical agriculturist and woman suffragist. She was one of the first and most active members of the Grange. Through Rose's efforts and the members of the National Grange Organization, the anti-option bill was passed. She was a prominent member of the Patrons of Industry and by her lectures and publications, did much to educate the farmers in the prominent reforms of the day, in which the advancement of women was one which always interested her. Rose was an active worker in the National Woman Suffrage Association, and in 1888, was appointed District President of that organization.

== Early years and education ==
Ellen Alida Rudd was born in Champion, New York, June 17, 1843. She was the youngest daughter of John C. and Lumeda Fowler Rudd. She was of English descent. The district school, with a few terms in the village academy, furnished her education.

== Career ==
On December 5, 1861, she married Alfred Rose. In 1862, they moved to Wisconsin, where her life was spent on a farm near Brodhead, Wisconsin. Associated with her husband in an equal partnership, she has lived and worked with him in a companionship which was seldom in that time as other marriages were founded on the idea of masculine supremacy. They had one child, a daughter, who became a well known artist In conjunction with her husband.

Rose oversaw all the work of the farm and took a part in all of it. She was a careful, conservative, successful farmer, and in her life, she vindicated woman's right to labor. She was also a reader, thinker and reformer. She took notes of every bill that passed the legislature, and watched every act of Congress. Her reform work was chiefly in connection with the Woman Suffrage Association, and in the ranks of the Labor party. She was an able speaker for both causes. As a farmer, she saw early on how the financial system disfavored the laboring classes, and was led to associate herself with those who were seeking the emancipation of labor. In 1873, near her home in Brodhead, she joined the National Grange, and for seventeen years, was an active member of that organization, holding many offices, among them county secretary and a member of the State committee on woman's work. As a result of her efforts, assisted by two or three other members, a Grange store was organized, which was in successful operation many years and saved many thousands of dollars for the farmers of Green County, Wisconsin. In 1888, when speculation in wheat produced hard times, Rose prepared and presented to her Grange the following resolutions:

Whereas, our boards of trade have become mere pool-rooms for the enrichment of their members, and whereas, by their manipulations of the markets they unsettle the values and nullify the law of supply and demand, so that producers do not receive legitimate prices for what they produce; and, whereas, by "cornering" the markets they are enabled to force up the prices of the necessaries of life, to the great distress and often starvation of the poor; therefore, resolved, that we demand immediate action by Congress, and the passage of such laws as shall forever prohibit gambling in the necessaries of life.

Those resolutions were unanimously adopted and forwarded through county and State Granges to the National Grange, where they were adopted and placed in the hands of the legislative committee of the Grange in Washington, D.C. where they were urged upon Congress with such force that the Anti-Option Bill in Congress was the result.

Rose became a prominent member of the Patrons of Industry, being one of the executive committee of the State association, and by lectures and publications, was educating the farmers in the prominent reforms of the day, including the advancement of women. From her earliest recollection, she was an advocate of woman suffrage, although she did not join any organization until 1886, when she became a member of the Wisconsin Woman's Suffrage Association and was instrumental in forming a local club, becoming its first president. In 1887, she assisted in organizing a county association and was appointed county organizer. In 1888, she was appointed district president.
