= Butterfield Lake (New York) =

- Location within New York Butterfield Lake (the United States)
- Location: Jefferson County, New York, United States
- Coordinates: 44°19′00″N 75°46′30″W
- Type: Lake
- Primary inflows: Mud Lake
- Primary outflows: Black Creek
- Basin countries: United States
- Surface area: 1,031 acres (4.17 km^{2})
- Average depth: 14 feet (4.3 m)
- Max. depth: 49 feet (15 m)
- Shore length^{1}: 10.1 miles (16.3 km)
- Surface elevation: 279 feet (85 m)
- Islands: 11
- Settlements: Redwood, New York
- ^{1} Shore length is not a well-defined measure.

Butterfield Lake is located near Redwood, New York. Water from adjacent Mud Lake flows into Butterfield Lake. Fish species present in the lake are largemouth bass, smallmouth bass, northern pike, walleye, yellow perch, black bullhead, bluegill, and black crappie, bowfin (ling), and possibly still some gar.
