= Hiram Hubbard House =

Historic house in New York, United States

- U.S. National Register of Historic Places
- Location within New York Location within the United States
- Location: 34237 NY 126, Champion, New York
- Coordinates: 43°57′52″N 75°41′18″W
- Area: 8 acres (3.2 ha)
- Built: 1820
- Built by: Eggleston, Asa
- Architectural style: Federal
- NRHP reference No.: 09000699
- Added to NRHP: September 9, 2009

Hiram Hubbard House, also known as Noadiah Hubbard House or Hubbard House, is a historic home located in Champion, Jefferson County, New York. It was built in 1820, and is a 2 1/2-story, three-bay, Federal style limestone dwelling. It has a side hall plan, rear kitchen wing, full basement, and side gable roof. It features an elliptical fanlight over the front door. The house was acquire by the 4 River Valleys Historical Society on November 15, 2005.

It was added to the National Register of Historic Places in 2012.
