= Village of Antwerp Historic District =

Historic district in New York, United States

- U.S. National Register of Historic Places
- U.S. Historic district
- Location within New York Location within the United States
- Location: Roughly Main, Depot, Maple, VanBuren, Mechanic, Fulton, Academy and Washington Sts., Lexington, Hoyt & Madison Aves., Antwerp, New York
- Coordinates: 44°11′53″N 75°36′33″W
- Area: 550 acres (220 ha)
- Built: 1816
- Architectural style: Federal, Mid 19th Century Revival, et al.
- NRHP reference No.: 01000389
- Added to NRHP: April 19, 2001

Village of Antwerp Historic District is a national historic district located at Antwerp in Jefferson County, New York. The district includes 241 contributing buildings, four contributing sites, one contributing structure, and one contributing object. It encompasses most of the village and includes residential, commercial, civic, and ecclesiastical buildings, a memorial park with monument, two cemeteries, and a stone arch bridge. Most of the buildings were built between 1840 and 1900.

It was listed on the National Register of Historic Places in 2001.
