= Great Bend, New York =

- Census-designated place
- Location within New York Location within the United States
- Coordinates: 44°2′11″N 75°42′30″W
- Country: United States
- State: New York
- County: Jefferson
- Town: Champion

Area
  - Total: 5.88 sq mi (15.24 km^{2})
  - Land: 5.79 sq mi (15.00 km^{2})
  - Water: 0.093 sq mi (0.24 km^{2})
- Elevation: 663 ft (202 m)

Population (2020)
  - Total: 807
  - Density: 139/sq mi (53.8/km^{2})
- Time zone: UTC-5 (Eastern (EST))
  - Summer (DST): UTC-4 (EDT)
- ZIP Codes: 13643 (Great Bend); 13619 (Carthage)
- Area code: 315
- FIPS code: 36-30136
- GNIS feature ID: 0951618

Great Bend is a hamlet and census-designated place (CDP) in Jefferson County, New York, United States. As of the 2020 census, Great Bend had a population of 807.

Great Bend is in the northern part of the town of Champion. It is adjacent to the southern section of the Fort Drum military reservation.

== Geography ==
Great Bend is located in eastern Jefferson County at 44°2′11″N 75°42′30″W (44.036396, -75.708376). It is bordered to the northeast and northwest (but not the north) by the Black River, which makes the bend referred to in the community's name. Across the river to the northwest is Fort Drum in the town of Le Ray, and across it to the northeast is the village of Deferiet in the town of Wilna.

According to the United States Census Bureau, the Great Bend CDP has a total area of 5.8 square miles (15.1 km^{2}), of which 5.8 square miles (15.0 km^{2}) are land and 0.04 square miles (0.1 km^{2}), or 0.97%, are water.

Great Bend is at the junction of New York State Route 3, New York State Route 26, and County Road 47. Route 3 leads east and southeast 7 miles (11 km) to Carthage, passing first through Deferiet, and west 10 miles (16 km) to Watertown, the Jefferson county seat. Route 26 leads northwest across Fort Drum 6 miles (10 km) to Evans Mills and southeast 7 miles (11 km) to West Carthage.

== Demographics ==
Historical population
Census	Pop.	Note	%±
2020	807		—
U.S. Decennial Census

As of the census of 2000, there were 801 people, 313 households, and 210 families residing in the CDP. The population density was 136.4 inhabitants per square mile (52.7/km^{2}). There were 348 housing units at an average density of 59.2 per square mile (22.9/km^{2}). The racial makeup of the CDP was 92.38% White, 2.12% African American, 1.00% Native American, 0.62% Asian, 0.62% from other races, and 3.25% from two or more races. Hispanic or Latino of any race were 0.87% of the population.

There were 313 households, out of which 31.6% had children under the age of 18 living with them, 59.1% were married couples living together, 5.1% had a female householder with no husband present, and 32.9% were non-families. 25.9% of all households were made up of individuals, and 7.7% had someone living alone who was 65 years of age or older. The average household size was 2.56 and the average family size was 3.12.

In the CDP, the population was spread out, with 25.1% under the age of 18, 10.1% from 18 to 24, 30.5% from 25 to 44, 24.7% from 45 to 64, and 9.6% who were 65 years of age or older. The median age was 36 years. For every 100 females, there were 99.8 males. For every 100 females age 18 and over, there were 106.2 males.

The median income for a household in the CDP was $32,250, and the median income for a family was $49,250. Males had a median income of $38,000 versus $20,417 for females. The per capita income for the CDP was $16,177. About 8.4% of families and 13.2% of the population were below the poverty line, including 14.7% of those under age 18 and none of those age 65 or over.
