= West Carthage, New York =

- Village
- Location within New York Location within the United States
- Coordinates: 43°58′25″N 75°37′17″W
- Country: United States
- State: New York
- County: Jefferson
- Town: Champion

Area
  - Total: 1.41 sq mi (3.64 km^{2})
  - Land: 1.31 sq mi (3.39 km^{2})
  - Water: 0.097 sq mi (0.25 km^{2})
- Elevation: 778 ft (237 m)

Population (2020)
  - Total: 1,780
  - Density: 1,361.4/sq mi (525.63/km^{2})
- Time zone: UTC-5 (Eastern (EST))
  - Summer (DST): UTC-4 (EDT)
- ZIP Code: 13619 (Carthage)
- Area code: 315
- FIPS code: 36-79499
- GNIS feature ID: 0969168
- Website: Village of West Carthage

West Carthage is a village in Jefferson County, New York, United States. The population was 1,780 at the 2020 census.

West Carthage is in the town of Champion, next to the eastern town line, and is east of Watertown. West Carthage is adjacent to the village of Carthage and is south of Fort Drum.

== History ==
Settlement began circa 1798 with a ferry service and tavern established at that location, but development was slower compared to Carthage on the other side of the Black River in spite of water power available to both communities.

The village was incorporated in 1889, yet the early village government encountered notable resistance to obtaining funds for development.

== Geography ==
West Carthage is located in eastern Jefferson County at 43°58′25″N 75°37′17″W, in the town of Champion. Its northeastern boundary follows the Black River, across which is the village of Carthage in the town of Wilna. The southeastern boundary of the village is the Jefferson/Lewis County line, with the town of Denmark as the village's neighbor.

According to the United States Census Bureau, West Carthage has a total area of 1.4 square miles (3.6 km^{2}), of which 1.30 square miles (3.36 km^{2}) are land and 0.097 square miles (0.25 km^{2}), or 6.96%, are water.

West Carthage is at the junction of New York State Route 26 and New York State Route 126. Route 26 leads northwest 6 miles (10 km) to Great Bend and southeast 15 miles (24 km) to Lowville, while Route 126 leads west 15 miles to Watertown, the Jefferson county seat.

== Demographics ==
Historical population
Census	Pop.	Note	%±
1880	807		—
1890	932		15.5%
1900	1,135		21.8%
1910	1,393		22.7%
1920	1,666		19.6%
1930	1,722		3.4%
1940	1,767		2.6%
1950	2,000		13.2%
1960	2,167		8.4%
1970	2,047		−5.5%
1980	1,824		−10.9%
1990	2,166		18.8%
2000	2,102		−3.0%
2010	2,012		−4.3%
2020	1,780		−11.5%
U.S. Decennial Census

As of the census of 2000, there were 2,102 people, 830 households, and 557 families residing in the village. The population density was 1,758.3 inhabitants per square mile (678.9/km^{2}). There were 915 housing units at an average density of 765.4 per square mile (295.5/km^{2}). The racial makeup of the village was 89.34% White, 4.14% African American, 0.81% Native American, 1.81% Asian, 0.29% Pacific Islander, 1.57% from other races, and 2.05% from two or more races. Hispanic or Latino of any race were 5.38% of the population.

There were 830 households, out of which 38.0% had children under the age of 18 living with them, 54.6% were married couples living together, 10.1% had a female householder with no husband present, and 32.8% were non-families. 28.7% of all households were made up of individuals, and 15.9% had someone living alone who was 65 years of age or older. The average household size was 2.53 and the average family size was 3.09.

In the village, the population was spread out, with 29.7% under the age of 18, 10.4% from 18 to 24, 28.7% from 25 to 44, 17.4% from 45 to 64, and 13.8% who were 65 years of age or older. The median age was 32 years. For every 100 females, there were 85.9 males. For every 100 females age 18 and over, there were 85.0 males.

The median income for a household in the village was $30,156, and the median income for a family was $34,609. Males had a median income of $33,043 versus $18,971 for females. The per capita income for the village was $14,915. About 9.2% of families and 10.6% of the population were below the poverty line, including 11.9% of those under age 18 and 8.5% of those age 65 or over.

== Notable people ==
- Thomas D. Homan, current acting director of U.S. Immigration and Customs Enforcement (ICE)
- Casey Powell, lacrosse player
- Michael Powell, lacrosse player
- Ryan Powell, lacrosse player
