= Castorland, New York =

- Village
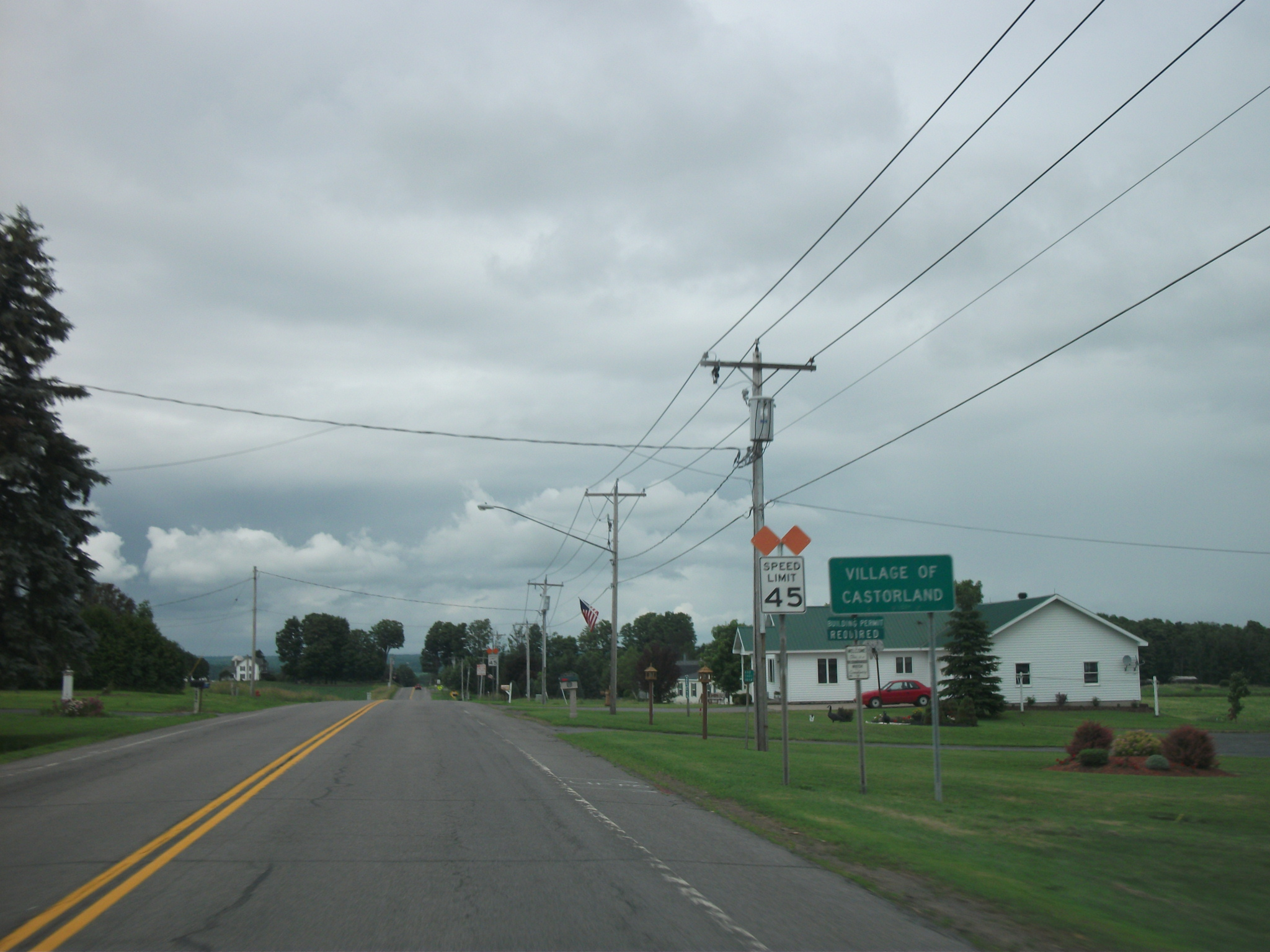
- Entering the village of Castorland via New York State Route 410 eastbound in February 2012

- Location within New York Location within the United States
- Coordinates: 43°53′15″N 75°30′50″W
- Country: United States
- State: New York
- County: Lewis
- Town: Denmark

Area
  - Total: 0.32 sq mi (0.83 km^{2})
  - Land: 0.32 sq mi (0.83 km^{2})
  - Water: 0 sq mi (0.00 km^{2})
- Elevation: 741 ft (226 m)

Population (2020)
  - Total: 334
  - Density: 1,040.3/sq mi (401.66/km^{2})
- Time zone: UTC-5 (Eastern (EST))
  - Summer (DST): UTC-4 (EDT)
- ZIP code: 13620
- Area code: 315
- FIPS code: 36-12881
- GNIS feature ID: 946006
- Website: villageofcastorlandny.gov

Castorland is a village in Lewis County, New York, United States; it is north of Lowville and southeast of Carthage. As of the 2020 census, Castorland had a population of 334.

== History ==
The village name means "Land of the Beaver". The name stems from a colony of refugees from the French Revolution, established in 1792 to provide a new home away from the violence in France. The land, 210,000 acres (850 km^{2}), was originally part of Macomb's Purchase. It was purchased by La Compagnie de New York. "Castorland" is a literal translation of the old Indian name of the area, Couch-sach-ra-ga. Due to many reverses, including harsh winters, poor planning, and loss of livestock and funds, the colony was dissolved in 1814. Many of the original settlers from the Castorland colony returned to Europe or moved to larger communities.

== Geography ==
Castorland is located in the southeast corner of the town of Denmark at 43°53′15″N 75°30′50″W (43.887379, -75.514002), on ground rising above the west side of the valley of the Black River, near the point where the Beaver River enters from the east. The village is located on New York State Route 410. The village of Croghan is 7 miles (11 km) east, Lowville is 8 miles (13 km) to the south, and Carthage is 9 miles (14 km) to the northwest.

According to the United States Census Bureau, the village of Castorland has a total area of 0.3 square miles (0.8 km^{2}), all land.

== Demographics ==
Historical population
Census	Pop.	Note	%±
1930	315		—
1940	309		−1.9%
1950	308		−0.3%
1960	321		4.2%
1970	327		1.9%
1980	277		−15.3%
1990	292		5.4%
2000	306		4.8%
2010	351		14.7%
2020	334		−4.8%
U.S. Decennial Census

As of the census of 2000, there were 306 people, 115 households, and 74 families residing in the village. The population density was 1,084.5 inhabitants per square mile (418.7/km^{2}). There were 136 housing units at an average density of 482.0 per square mile (186.1/km^{2}). The racial makeup of the village was 97.06% White, 0.65% African American, 0.33% Asian, 0.33% Pacific Islander, 0.65% from other races, and 0.98% from two or more races. Hispanic or Latino of any race were 1.31% of the population.

There were 115 households, out of which 28.7% had children under the age of 18 living with them, 58.3% were married couples living together, 3.5% had a female householder with no husband present, and 34.8% were non-families. 26.1% of all households were made up of individuals, and 14.8% had someone living alone who was 65 years of age or older. The average household size was 2.56 and the average family size was 3.23.

In the village, the population was spread out, with 24.8% under the age of 18, 9.5% from 18 to 24, 28.1% from 25 to 44, 22.5% from 45 to 64, and 15.0% who were 65 years of age or older. The median age was 38 years. For every 100 females, there were 91.3 males. For every 100 females age 18 and over, there were 85.5 males.

The median income for a household in the village was $33,125, and the median income for a family was $45,625. Males had a median income of $35,714 versus $16,806 for females. The per capita income for the village was $12,101. About 1.4% of families and 13.3% of the population were below the poverty line, including 6.7% of those under the age of eighteen and 10.0% of those 65 or over.

== The Castorland Medal ==
In 1796 the Paris Mint struck a half dollar-sized token (jeton) to commemorate the "Franco-American Colony". Since that time numerous restrikes have been made and remain commercially available to collectors. While listed in A Guide Book of United States Coins, it was not intended for circulation.
