= Croghan (village), New York =

Croghan, New York
- Village
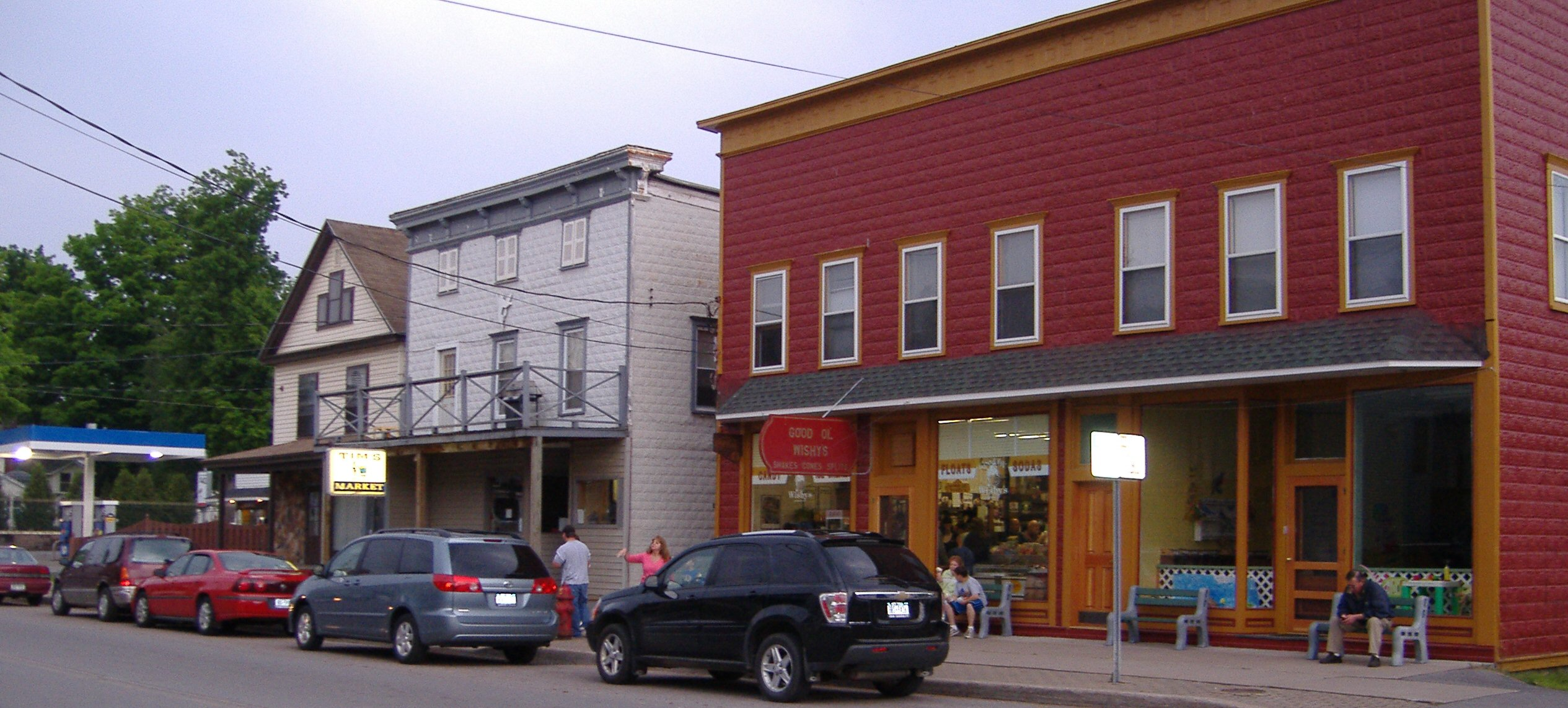
- Local grocery store and traditional soda fountain on Main Street, Croghan

- Location within New York Location within the United States
- Coordinates: 43°53′40″N 75°23′28″W
- Country: United States
- State: New York
- County: Lewis
- Towns: Croghan, New Bremen

Area
  - Total: 0.43 sq mi (1.12 km^{2})
  - Land: 0.43 sq mi (1.12 km^{2})
  - Water: 0 sq mi (0.00 km^{2})
- Elevation: 840 ft (260 m)

Population (2020)
  - Total: 639
  - Density: 1,472.8/sq mi (568.66/km^{2})
- Time zone: UTC-5 (Eastern (EST))
  - Summer (DST): UTC-4 (EDT)
- ZIP code: 13327
- Area code: 315
- FIPS code: 36-19070
- GNIS feature ID: 2391629
- Website: www.croghanny.org

Croghan is a village in Lewis County, New York, United States. Its population was 618 at the 2010 census.

The village is situated mainly in the southern part of the town of Croghan, with a small part in New Bremen. The town and the village were both named after George Croghan, a soldier in the War of 1812.

The village slogan, which reflects Croghan's proximity to the Adirondack Mountains, is "In the Foothills of the Adirondacks".

== History ==
The village was once a booming region for the lumber industry. During the late 19th century, one particularly influential member of the local community was millionaire lumber baron Theodore B. Basselin, whose estate sat on the corner of Main Street and Bank Street. His mansion remains there to this day. Basselin is buried in a private family plot along Main Street, next to the village library, which once served as the opera house.

Croghan survived two major fires in the early 1900s, the first of which claimed the lives of two small children. The fire started next to where Stumps Tavern now sits along Main and Mechanic and engulfed most of the village, even burning down the massive Catholic church and divinity school.

The village was a center of the pure maple syrup industry before a microburst in the mid-1990s which brought extremely high winds, destroying many of the older, larger trees.

Croghan is popular with avid outdoorsmen from throughout the country who visit the area in the summer for fishing and camping, in the fall for hunting, and in the winter for sledding.

== Geography ==
Croghan is located northeast of the center of Lewis County at the junction of New York State Routes 126 and 812. It is primarily in the southern part of the town of Croghan, but a small portion of the village crosses into the town of New Bremen to the south.

According to the United States Census Bureau, the village has a total area of 0.42 square miles (1.1 km^{2}), all land.

The Beaver River, a tributary of the Black River, flows through the village. Croghan is 10 miles (16 km) northeast of the county seat, Lowville.

=== Adjacent communities ===
Kirschnerville is to the east of Croghan, New Bremen to its south; Beaver Falls is down the Beaver River to the west, and Belfort up the river to the northeast.

== Demographics ==
Historical population
Census	Pop.	Note	%±
1880	445		—
1910	621		—
1920	646		4.0%
1930	732		13.3%
1940	801		9.4%
1950	772		−3.6%
1960	821		6.3%
1970	765		−6.8%
1980	703		−8.1%
1990	664		−5.5%
2000	665		0.2%
2010	618		−7.1%
2020	639		3.4%
U.S. Decennial Census

As of the census of 2000, there were 665 people, 284 households, and 178 families residing in the village. The population density was 1,525.7 inhabitants per square mile (589.1/km^{2}). There were 323 housing units at an average density of 741.1 per square mile (286.1/km^{2}). The racial makeup of the village was 98.65% White, 0.60% Black or African American, 0.15% Native American, 0.45% Asian, and 0.15% from two or more races. Hispanic or Latino of any race were 0.45% of the population.

There were 284 households, out of which 28.5% had children under the age of 18 living with them, 49.6% were married couples living together, 9.5% had a female householder with no husband present, and 37.3% were non-families. 33.8% of all households were made up of individuals, and 21.5% had someone living alone who was 65 years of age or older. The average household size was 2.34 and the average family size was 3.06.

In the village, the population was spread out, with 26.3% under the age of 18, 8.4% from 18 to 24, 23.3% from 25 to 44, 19.8% from 45 to 64, and 22.1% who were 65 years of age or older. The median age was 39 years. For every 100 females, there were 86.8 males. For every 100 females age 18 and over, there were 83.5 males.

The median income for a household in the village was $26,304, and the median income for a family was $37,969. Males had a median income of $27,969 versus $22,500 for females. The per capita income for the village was $14,183. About 6.7% of families and 10.8% of the population were below the poverty line, including 12.4% of those under age 18 and 21.4% of those age 65 or over.

== Places of interest ==
The American Maple Museum, located on Main Street, was formerly the Father Leo Memorial School.
