= Antwerp (village), New York =

Antwerp, New York
- Village
- Location within New York Location within the United States
- Coordinates: 44°12′N 75°37′W
- Country: United States
- State: New York
- County: Jefferson
- Town: Antwerp

Area
  - Total: 1.03 sq mi (2.67 km^{2})
  - Land: 1.00 sq mi (2.60 km^{2})
  - Water: 0.031 sq mi (0.08 km^{2})
- Elevation: 512 ft (156 m)

Population (2020)
  - Total: 506
  - Density: 504.3/sq mi (194.71/km^{2})
- Time zone: UTC-5 (Eastern (EST))
  - Summer (DST): UTC-4 (EDT)
- ZIP codes: 13608, 13671
- Area code: 315
- FIPS code: 36-02286
- GNIS feature ID: 0942514
- Website: villageofantwerp.net

Antwerp is a village in Jefferson County, New York, United States. The population was 686 at the 2010 census. The village is in center of the town of Antwerp and is northeast of Watertown.

== History ==
The village was formerly called "Indian River" due to its location on that river.

Antwerp was incorporated as a village in 1853. The historic core of the village was listed on the National Register of Historic Places in 2001 as the Village of Antwerp Historic District.

== Geography ==
According to the United States Census Bureau, the village has a total area of 1.07 square miles (2.76 km^{2}), of which 1.03 square miles (2.68 km^{2}) are land and 0.04 square miles (0.1 km^{2}), or 3.05%, are water.

The Indian River, part of the Oswegatchie River watershed, flows through the center of the village.

The village is on U.S. Route 11, 23 miles (37 km) northeast of Watertown and 13 miles (21 km) southwest of Gouverneur.

== Demographics ==
Historical population
Census	Pop.	Note	%±
1840	300		—
1850	250		−16.7%
1860	621		148.4%
1870	773		24.5%
1880	731		−5.4%
1890	912		24.8%
1900	929		1.9%
1910	974		4.8%
1920	1,012		3.9%
1930	868		−14.2%
1940	817		−5.9%
1950	846		3.5%
1960	881		4.1%
1970	872		−1.0%
1980	749		−14.1%
1990	739		−1.3%
2000	716		−3.1%
2010	686		−4.2%
2020	506		−26.2%
U.S. Decennial Census

As of the census of 2000, there were 716 people, 260 households, and 166 families residing in the village. The population density was 682.4 inhabitants per square mile (263.5/km^{2}). There were 305 housing units at an average density of 290.7 per square mile (112.2/km^{2}). The racial makeup of the village was 96.51% White, 0.28% Black or African American, 0.14% Native American, 0.84% Asian, 0.98% from other races, and 1.26% from two or more races. Hispanic or Latino of any race were 2.93% of the population.

There were 260 households, out of which 35.0% had children under the age of 18 living with them, 48.8% were married couples living together, 10.4% had a female householder with no husband present, and 35.8% were non-families. 28.1% of all households were made up of individuals, and 16.5% had someone living alone who was 65 years of age or older. The average household size was 2.75 and the average family size was 3.40.

In the village, the population was spread out, with 31.4% under the age of 18, 8.4% from 18 to 24, 25.3% from 25 to 44, 22.2% from 45 to 64, and 12.7% who were 65 years of age or older. The median age was 36 years. For every 100 females, there were 94.0 males. For every 100 females age 18 and over, there were 93.3 males.

The median income for a household in the village was $33,472, and the median income for a family was $40,833. Males had a median income of $36,042 versus $23,542 for females. The per capita income for the village was $12,881. About 15.7% of families and 19.2% of the population were below the poverty line, including 26.5% of those under age 18 and 9.2% of those age 65 or over.

== Education ==
The school district is the Indian River Central School District.
