= Redwood, New York =

- Census-designated place
- Location within New York Location within the United States
- Coordinates: 44°18′3″N 75°48′2″W
- Country: United States
- State: New York
- County: Jefferson
- Town: Alexandria

Area
  - Total: 2.48 sq mi (6.43 km^{2})
  - Land: 1.97 sq mi (5.10 km^{2})
  - Water: 0.51 sq mi (1.33 km^{2})
- Elevation: 367 ft (112 m)

Population (2020)
  - Total: 493
  - Density: 250.6/sq mi (96.75/km^{2})
- Time zone: UTC-5 (Eastern (EST))
  - Summer (DST): UTC-4 (EDT)
- ZIP code: 13679
- Area codes: 315, 680
- FIPS code: 36-61016
- GNIS feature ID: 0962337

Redwood is a hamlet and census-designated place (CDP) in Jefferson County, New York, United States. As of the 2020 census, Redwood had a population of 493.

== Geography ==
Redwood is located in the eastern part of the town of Alexandria. The community is bordered to the southeast by the town of Theresa.

According to the United States Census Bureau, the CDP has a total area of 2.5 square miles (6.6 km^{2}), of which 2.0 square miles (5.2 km^{2}) are land and 0.54 square miles (1.4 km^{2}), or 20.89%, are water. Mud Lake is in the southern part of the CDP, and the southwest end of Butterfield Lake is in the eastern part.

Redwood is located on New York State Route 37 at the junction of County Roads 3 and 192. Route 37 leads south 24 miles (39 km) to Watertown, the county seat, and north 22 miles (35 km) to Morristown on the St. Lawrence River. Alexandria Bay, also on the St. Lawrence, is 7 miles (11 km) to the northwest by County Route 192 and State Route 26.

== Notable residents ==
Former Democratic U.S. Representative John Cosgrove, who served Missouri's 6th Congressional District, was born near Alexandria Bay and attended school in Redwood, NY.

Former boxer Tommy Ryan was born here.

== Demographics ==
Historical population
Census	Pop.	Note	%±
2020	493		—
U.S. Decennial Census

As of the 2000 census, there were 584 people, 205 households, and 160 families residing in the village. The population density was 286.8 inhabitants per square mile (110.7/km^{2}). There were 277 housing units at an average density of 136.1 per square mile (52.5/km^{2}). The racial makeup of the CDP was 98.63% White, 0.68% African American, and 0.68% from two or more races.

There were 205 households, out of which people 42.4% had children under the age of 18 living with them, 61.0% were married couples living together, 11.7% had a female householder with no husband present, and 21.5% were non-families. 19.0% of all households were made up of individuals, and 9.3% had someone living alone who was 65 years of age or older. The average household size was 2.85 and the average family size was 3.25.

In the community, the population was spread out, with 31.2% under the age of 18, 5.0% from 18 to 24, 31.7% from 25 to 44, 20.5% from 45 to 64, and 11.6% who were 65 years of age or older. The median age was 35 years. For every 100 females, there were 99.3 males. For every 100 females age 18 and over, there were 89.6 males.

The median income for a household in the community was $36,850, and the median income for a family was $42,721. Males had a median income of $32,344 versus $21,250 for females. The per capita income for the village was $14,105. 12.1% of the population and 9.2% of families were below the poverty line. Out of the total population, 27.3% of those under the age of 18 and 3.1% of those 65 and older were living below the poverty line.

== Education ==
The school district is Alexandria Central School District.
