= List of county routes in Lewis County, New York =

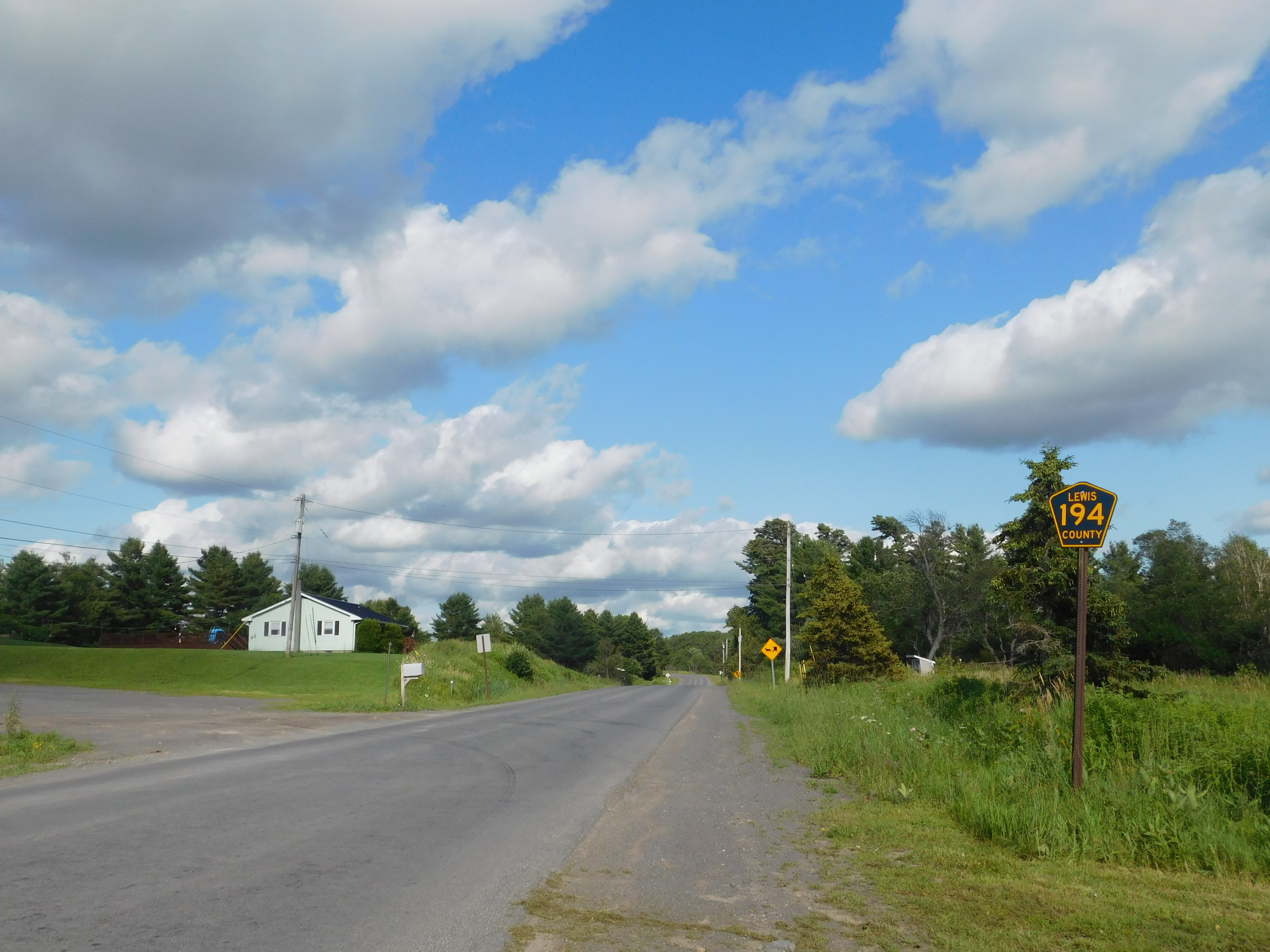
- Standard signage in Lewis County, denoted by CR 194 in Barnes Corners

Highway names
- Interstates: Interstate X (I-X)
- US Highways: U.S. Route X (US X)
- State: New York State Route X (NY X)
- County: County Route X (CR X)

System links
- New York Highways; Interstate; US; State; Reference; Parkways

County routes in Lewis County, New York, are signed with the Manual on Uniform Traffic Control Devices-standard yellow-on-blue pentagon route marker.

== Routes 1–40 ==
Route	Length (mi)	Length (km)	From	Via	To	Notes
CR 1	1.00	1.61	CR 4 at McCoy Road	Henry Road in Diana	NY 3	
CR 2	1.86	2.99	Jefferson County line (becomes CR 96)	Seven-by-Nine Road in Pinckney	NY 177 / CR 21	
CR 4	3.82	6.15	Jefferson County line	Factory Road in Diana	CR 1 at Henry Road	
CR 5	2.58	4.15	NY 3	Bonaparte Road in Diana	Dead end at Lake Bonaparte	
CR 6	2.70	4.35	NY 126	Old State Road in Croghan	CR 8 at Branigan Road	
CR 7	1.50	2.41	NY 3	Hermitage Road in Diana	Hotel Road	
CR 8	5.98	9.62	CR 35	Second Road in Croghan	CR 6 at Branigan Road	
CR 9	2.51	4.04	NY 812	Cut-Off Road in New Bremen	NY 126 / CR 35	
CR 10	3.61	5.81	NY 812	Belfort Road in Croghan	Long Pond Road	
CR 11	0.46	0.74	CR 194 at Copenhagen village line	Mechanic Street in Copenhagen	NY 12	Formerly part of NY 194
CR 12	0.73	1.17	NY 26	Station Road in Denmark	Dead end at Mohawk, Adirondack and Northern Railroad	
CR 13	2.02	3.25	CR 55	Limburg Forks Road in Denmark	Jefferson County line (becomes CR 45)	
CR 14	10.24	16.48	Lowville village line in Lowville	Number Three Road	NY 12 in Denmark	
CR 15	0.55	0.89	NY 12	Washington Street in Copenhagen	CR 16 at Copenhagen village line	
CR 16	1.43	2.30	CR 15 at Copenhagen village line	Plank Road in Denmark	Jefferson County line (becomes CR 163)	
CR 17	6.49	10.44	NY 177 in Harrisburg	Wood Battle Road	NY 12 in Copenhagen	
CR 18	0.95	1.53	CR 21	Cronk Road in Pinckney	End of county maintenance	
CR 19	6.61	10.64	North Phinny Road in Lowville	East Road	NY 26 in Denmark	
CR 20	0.89	1.43	NY 12	Vary Road in Harrisburg	CR 14	
CR 21	3.48	5.60	NY 177 / CR 2	Whitesville Road in Pinckney	Jefferson County line (becomes CR 156)	Part south of CR 194 was formerly part of NY 194
CR 22	3.13	5.04	NY 12 in Martinsburg	East Martinsburg Road	CR 26 in Lowville	
CR 23	0.72	1.16	NY 12 in Martinsburg	Markowski Road	CR 26 in Lowville	
CR 24	0.27	0.43	NY 812	Convent Street in Croghan village	CR 60 at Croghan village line	
CR 25	4.43	7.13	NY 177	Cobb Road in Harrisburg	NY 12	
CR 26	16.99	27.34	Lowville village line in Lowville	Number Four Road	Stillwater Road in Watson	
CR 27	6.15	9.90	CR 28 at Salmon River Road in Montague	Sears Pond Road	NY 177 in Harrisburg	
CR 28	4.48	7.21	NY 177 in Pinckney	Liberty Road	CR 27 at Salmon River Road in Montague	
CR 29	7.78	12.52	NY 26 in Martinsburg	West Road	NY 177 in Lowville	
CR 30	1.15	1.85	CR 29	Cemetery Road in Martinsburg	NY 26	
CR 31	1.91	3.07	CR 29 in Martinsburg	West Martinsburg Road	Lowville village line in Lowville	
CR 32	3.38	5.44	CR 34	Glendale Road in Martinsburg	NY 26	
CR 33	5.60	9.01	NY 812 in New Bremen	Van Amber Road	NY 410 in Croghan	
CR 34	3.47	5.58	NY 12 in Martinsburg	Houseville, Glendale, and Glenfield roads	CR 32 in Martinsburg	
CR 35	1.07	1.72	NY 126 in New Bremen	Main Street	NY 126 / CR 9 in Croghan	
CR 36	1.45	2.33	NY 12 in Turin	Burdicks Crossing Road	CR 39 (segment 1) / CR 76 in Greig	
CR 37	4.31	6.94	CR 26 in Watson	Snell Road	NY 812 in New Bremen	
CR 38	1.49	2.40	CR 51	Main Street in Turin	CR 43	
CR 39 (1)	8.10	13.04	CR 36 / CR 76 in Lyons Falls	Lyons Falls, Greig, and Pine Grove roads	CR 26 in Watson	
CR 39 (2)	0.21	0.34	Franklin Street	Laura Street in Lyons Falls	CR 76	
CR 40	1.89	3.04	CR 53 in Martinsburg	Greig Road	CR 39 (segment 1) in Greig	

== Routes 41 and up ==
Route	Length (mi)	Length (km)	From	Via	To	Notes
CR 41	1.62	2.61	CR 40	Blue Street in Martinsburg	NY 12	
CR 42	4.55	7.32	CR 39 (segment 1)	Brantingham Road in Greig	Lake House Road	
CR 43	11.31	18.20	Oneida County line in Leyden (becomes CR 74A)	East Road	CR 79 in Turin	
CR 44	1.71	2.75	Oswego County line (becomes CR 39)	Redfield Road in Osceola	CR 46	
CR 45	3.78	6.08	CR 48	Mackey Road in West Turin	Turin town line	
CR 46	15.89	25.57	CR 78 in Osceola	Osceola Road	NY 26 in Lewis	
CR 47	11.37	18.30	NY 26 in Lewis	Fish Creek Road	CR 48 in West Turin	
CR 48	4.44	7.15	Byron Corners Road	Highmarket Road in West Turin	CR 52 at Constableville village line	
CR 49	1.87	3.01	CR 47	Byron Corners Road in West Turin	Sullivan Road	
CR 50	1.12	1.80	NY 26 in Constableville	John Street	Leyden town line in West Turin	
CR 51	8.33	13.41	NY 26 in West Turin	West Road	NY 26 in Turin	
CR 52	0.80	1.29	CR 48 at Constableville village line	West Main Street in Constableville	NY 26	
CR 53	0.48	0.77	NY 12 in Turin	Main Street	CR 40 in Martinsburg	
CR 54	3.85	6.20	NY 26 in Lewis	Golden Road	Oneida County line in Leyden (becomes CR 65)	
CR 55	4.68	7.53	Copenhagen village line	Deer River Road in Denmark	NY 26	
CR 56	1.51	2.43	CR 40	Otter Creek Road in Greig	CR 39 (segment 1)	
CR 60	2.70	4.35	CR 24 at Croghan village line	Kirchnerville Road in New Bremen	Erie Canal Road	
CR 62	1.02	1.64	CR 43 in Turin	Turin Road	NY 12 in West Turin	
CR 68	1.62	2.61	NY 12D	Rugg Road in Leyden	CR 70 at Port Leyden village line	
CR 70	0.32	0.51	CR 68 at Port Leyden village line	Elm Street in Port Leyden	CR 71 at Leyden Road	
CR 71	0.83	1.34	CR 70 at Leyden Road	Main Street in Port Leyden	CR 72	
CR 72	0.58	0.93	CR 71	Pearl Street in Port Leyden	CR 73 at Port Leyden village line	
CR 73	2.60	4.18	CR 72 at Port Leyden village line	Marmon Road in Lyonsdale	CR 74 at West Lowdale Road	
CR 74	2.38	3.83	CR 75 at River Road	Lyonsdale Road in Lyonsdale	CR 73 at West Lowdale Road	
CR 75	0.04	0.06	CR 74 at River Road	Laura Street in Lyonsdale	CR 76	
CR 76	5.18	8.34	CR 75 in Lyonsdale	Lyons Falls and Greig roads	CR 36 / CR 39 (segment 1) in Greig	
CR 78	2.58	4.15	Oneida County line (becomes CR 68)	Florence Road in Osceola	CR 46	
CR 79	2.81	4.52	CR 43	Lee Road in Turin	NY 12	
CR 80	0.28	0.45	NY 12	Glenfield Road in Martinsburg	CR 53	
CR 147	1.79	2.88	Jefferson County line	Rogers Crossing Road in Croghan	Jefferson County line	
CR 175	1.01	1.63	Jefferson County line (becomes CR 69)	Creek Road in Pinckney	Jefferson County line (becomes CR 69)	
CR 194	8.70	14.00	CR 21 in Pinckney	Barnes Corners Road	CR 11 at Copenhagen village line in Denmark	Formerly part of NY 194

== See also ==
- County routes in New York
