= New York's 117th State Assembly district =

American legislative district

Assemblymember
Ken Blankenbush; R–Black River

New York's 117th State Assembly district is one of the 150 districts in the New York State Assembly. It has been represented by Ken Blankenbush since 2011.

== Geography ==
=== 2020s ===
District 117 contains a majority of St. Lawrence County, all of Lewis County, and portions of Oneida and Jefferson counties. It includes the towns of Diana, Croghan, Lowville, New Bremen, Watson, Harrisburg, Denmark, Pinckney, Montague, Martinsburg, Greig, Turin, West Turin, Osceola, Lewis, Lyonsdale, Leyden, Fine, Clifton, Pierrepont, Clare, Russell, DeKalb, Gouverneur, Fowler, Hermon, Edwards, Pitcairn, Parishville, Colton, Hopkinton, Piercefield, Lawrence, Stockholm, Norfolk, Brasher, Ava, Vienna, Camden, Florence, Annsville, Boonville, Forestport, Lee, Rodman, Rutland, Champion, Le Ray, and Wilna.

The district (partially) overlaps with New York's 21st and 24th congressional districts, as well as the 45th, 49th and 53rd districts of the New York State Senate.

=== 2010s ===
District 117 contains a majority of Jefferson County, all of Lewis County, and portions of Oneida and St. Lawrence counties. It included the towns of Diana, Croghan, Lowville, New Bremen, Watson, Harrisburg, Denmark, Pinckney, Montague, Martinsburg, Greig, Turin, West Turin, Osceola, Lewis, Lyonsdale, Leyden, Fowler, Hermon, Edwards, Pitcairn, Russell, DeKalb, Ava, Vienna, Camden, Florence, Annsville, Verona, Forestport, Westmoreland, Remsen, Kirkland, Rodman, Rutland, Champion, Le Ray, Wilna, Adams, Lorraine, Worth, Henderson and Watertown.

== Recent election results ==
=== 2026 ===
2026 New York State Assembly election, District 117
Party	Candidate	Votes	%
Republican	Tammie Nabywaniec		
Conservative	Tammie Nabywaniec		
Total	Tammie Nabywaniec		
Democratic	Dennis Gordon		
Working Families	Dennis Gordon		
Total	Dennis Gordon		
Write-in			
Total votes			

=== 2024 ===
2024 New York State Assembly election, District 117
Party	Candidate	Votes	%
Republican	Ken Blankenbush	36,222	
Conservative	Ken Blankenbush	5,225	
Total	Ken Blankenbush (incumbent)	41,447	99.6
Write-in		155	0.4
Total votes		41,602	100.0
Republican hold			

=== 2022 ===
2022 New York State Assembly election, District 117
Party	Candidate	Votes	%
Republican	Ken Blankenbush	29,119	
Conservative	Ken Blankenbush	4,102	
Total	Ken Blankenbush (incumbent)	33,221	99.7
Write-in		101	0.3
Total votes		33,322	100.0
Republican hold			

=== 2020 ===
2020 New York State Assembly election, District 117
Party	Candidate	Votes	%
Republican	Ken Blankenbush	36,515	
Conservative	Ken Blankenbush	4,237	
Independence	Ken Blankenbush	3,320	
Total	Ken Blankenbush (incumbent)	44,072	99.5
Write-in		209	0.5
Total votes		44,281	100.0
Republican hold			

=== 2018 ===
2018 New York State Assembly election, District 117
Party	Candidate	Votes	%
Republican	Ken Blankenbush	25,769	
Conservative	Ken Blankenbush	2,982	
Independence	Ken Blankenbush	2,822	
Total	Ken Blankenbush (incumbent)	31,573	99.6
Write-in		139	0.4
Total votes		31,712	100.0
Republican hold			

=== 2016 ===
2016 New York State Assembly election, District 117
Party	Candidate	Votes	%
Republican	Ken Blankenbush	29,884	
Independence	Ken Blankenbush	3,820	
Conservative	Ken Blankenbush	3,714	
Total	Ken Blankenbush (incumbent)	37,418	99.7
Write-in		106	0.3
Total votes		37,524	100.0
Republican hold			

=== 2014 ===
2014 New York State Assembly election, District 117
Party	Candidate	Votes	%
Republican	Ken Blankenbush	18,118	
Conservative	Ken Blankenbush	2,564	
Independence	Ken Blankenbush	2,544	
Total	Ken Blankenbush (incumbent)	23,226	99.6
Write-in		102	0.4
Total votes		23,328	100.0
Republican hold			

=== 2012 ===
2012 New York State Assembly election, District 117
Party	Candidate	Votes	%
Republican	Ken Blankenbush	25,788	
Independence	Ken Blankenbush	4,054	
Conservative	Ken Blankenbush	3,150	
Total	Ken Blankenbush (incumbent)	32,992	99.7
Write-in		113	0.3
Total votes		33,105	100.0
Republican hold			
