= New York State Route 194 =

Former state highway in New York State

New York State Route 194
- NY 194 highlighted in red

Route information
- Maintained by NYSDOT
- Length: 9.49 mi (15.27 km)
- Existed: 1930–May 12, 1980

Major junctions
- South end: NY 177 in Pinckney
- North end: NY 12 in Copenhagen

Location
- Country: United States
- State: New York
- Counties: Lewis

Highway system
- New York Highways; Interstate; US; State; Reference; Parkways
← NY 193	→ NY 195

New York State Route 194 (NY 194) was a 9.49-mile-long (15.27 km) state highway that was located in Lewis County, New York. It began at an intersection with NY 177 in Barnes Corners, a hamlet within the town of Pinckney, and progressed northeast to its northern terminus at a junction with NY 12 in Copenhagen.

When NY 194 was assigned as part of the 1930 renumbering of state highways in New York, it extended northeast through Copenhagen to NY 26 in Denmark. It was truncated to NY 12 in the late 1930s. On April 1, 1980, ownership and maintenance of NY 194 was transferred from the state of New York to Lewis County as part of a highway maintenance swap between the two levels of government. NY 194 was the only highway transferred to the county as part of the swap. The NY 194 designation was removed just over one month later. Most of its former routing is now County Route 194 (CR 194).

== Route description ==
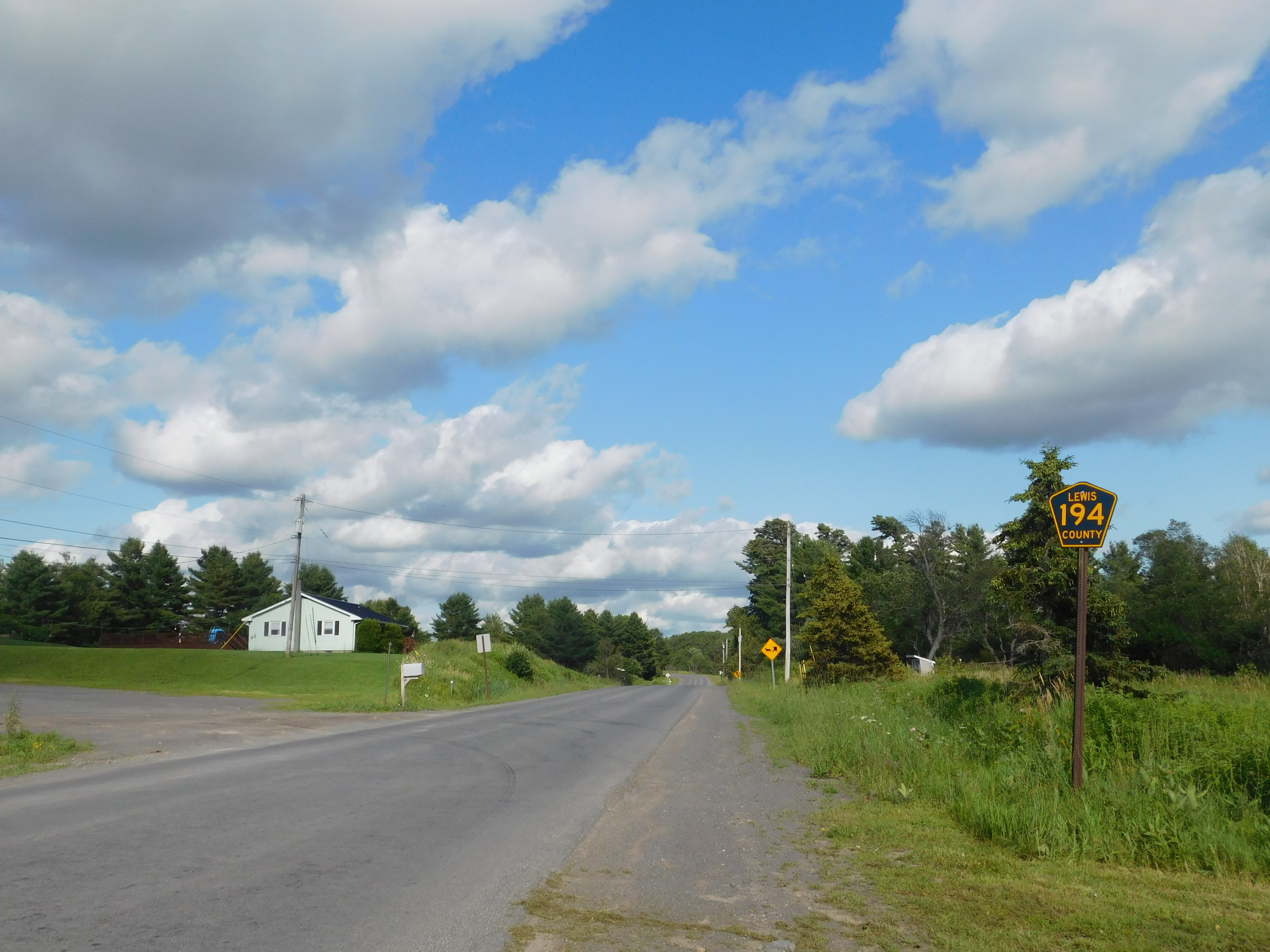
First reassurance marker on northbound CR 194 (former NY 194) in Barnes Corners

NY 194 began at an intersection with NY 177 in the hamlet of Barnes Corners within the town of Pinckney in Lewis County. The route first went northward, intersecting with CR 21, where it turned to the northeast. NY 194 continued to the northeast, entering the Pinckney State Reforestation Area. McDown Road, a dirt road, intersected with NY 194 just before the main highway entered the hamlet of Forks Number Two. NY 194 left Forks Number Two and went on towards Copenhagen. Now in the town of Pinckney, NY 194 made several turns in direction until entering the hamlet of Pinckney Corners. At this point NY 194 was edging ever closer to Copenhagen, the largest municipality along the highway.

NY 194 left the town of Pinckney and entered the area of Copenhagen about 0.8-mile (1.3 km) north of Pinckney Corners. The route downgraded in elevation and entered Copenhagen. In the heart of the village, NY 194 passed a few businesses and the central school before terminating at an intersection with NY 12.

== History ==
NY 194 was assigned as part of the 1930 renumbering of state highways in New York to an alignment extending from NY 177 in Barnes Corners in the southwest to NY 26 in the northeast via Copenhagen. It was truncated to NY 12 c. 1939. On April 1, 1980, ownership and maintenance of NY 194 was transferred from the state of New York to Lewis County as part of a highway maintenance swap between the two levels of government. It was the only highway transferred to the county as part of the swap, which involved taking over county-maintained sections of NY 812 from Croghan to Remington's Corners. The NY 194 designation was removed on May 12 of that year. Its former routing from Whitesville Road to the Copenhagen village line is now CR 194 while the former routing within the village is now CR 11 while the small portion that was on Whitesville Road is now part of CR 21.

== Major intersections ==
The entire route was in Lewis County.

Location	mi	km	Destinations	Notes
Pinckney	0.00	0.00	NY 177	Southern terminus; hamlet of Barnes Corners
Copenhagen	9.49	15.27	NY 12	Northern terminus
1.000 mi = 1.609 km; 1.000 km = 0.621 mi

== See also ==
- List of county routes in Lewis County, New York
