= Deer River, New York =

- Hamlet
- Location within New York Location within the United States
- Coordinates: 43°55′47″N 75°35′21″W
- Country: United States
- State: New York
- County: Lewis
- Town: Denmark
- Elevation: 781 ft (238 m)
- Time zone: UTC-5 (Eastern (EST))
  - Summer (DST): UTC-4 (EDT)
- ZIP code: 13627
- Area codes: 315 & 680
- GNIS feature ID: 948232

Deer River is a hamlet in the town of Denmark, Lewis County, New York, United States. The community is located along the Deer River and New York State Route 26, 3.5 miles (5.6 km) south-southeast of Carthage and 1 mile (1.6 km) west of the Deer River's confluence with the Black River. Deer River had a post office from September 19, 1845, until June 4, 1994; it still has its own ZIP code, 13627.
