= Chester Hazen =

American politician (1824–1900)

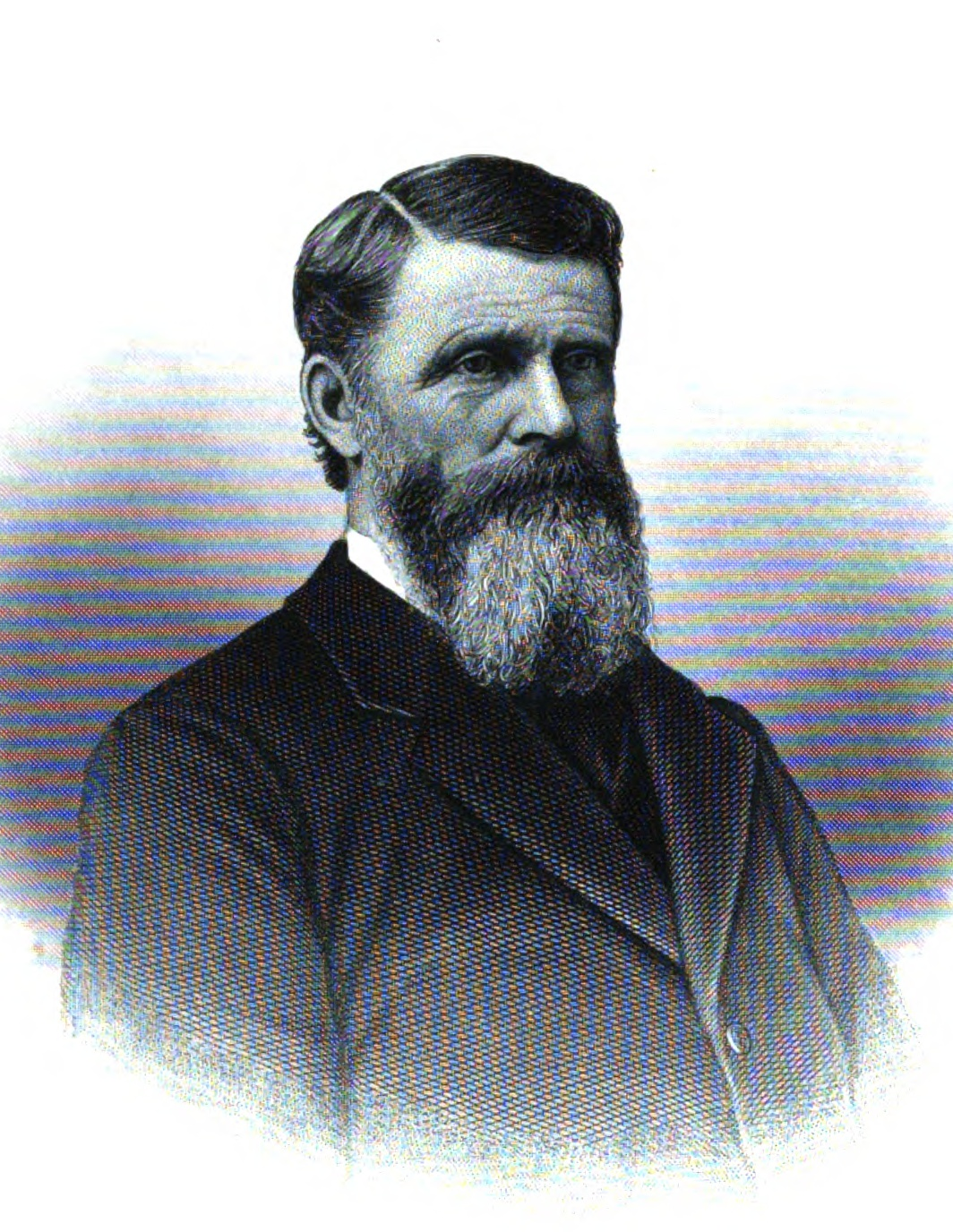
- From Portrait and biographical album of Fond du Lac County, Wisconsin (1889)

29th Mayor of Ripon, Wisconsin
- In office April 1896 – April 1897
- Preceded by: Philomen Wicks
- Succeeded by: George L. Field

Member of the Wisconsin State Assembly from the Fond du Lac 1st district
- In office January 5, 1885 – January 3, 1887
- Preceded by: William W. D. Turner
- Succeeded by: George H. Ferris

Personal details
- Born: January 31, 1824 Denmark, New York, U.S.
- Died: April 24, 1900 (aged 76) Ripon, Wisconsin, U.S.
- Resting place: Wedges Prairie Cemetery, Ripon, Wisconsin
- Party: Republican
- Children: Della Margaret (Griffin)^{(b. 1855; died 1924)}; Bertie Atwood Hazen^{(b. 1859; died 1862)}

Chester Hazen (January 31, 1824 – April 24, 1900) was an American farmer, Republican politician, and Wisconsin pioneer. He was the 29th mayor of Ripon, Wisconsin, and served one term in the Wisconsin State Assembly, representing Fond du Lac County. He established the first cheese factory in Wisconsin.

== Biography ==
Born in Denmark, New York, Hazen moved to Wisconsin Territory in 1844. He eventually settled on a farm in Ladoga, Wisconsin, where he started the first cheese factory in Wisconsin. Hazen also helped found the Fond du Lac Dairyman Association and the Wisconsin Dairyman Association. Hazen served in the Wisconsin State Assembly from 1885 to 1886. In 1895, he moved to Ripon, Wisconsin, where he served as mayor. He died in Ripon.

Wisconsin State Assembly
Preceded by William W. D. Turner	Member of the Wisconsin State Assembly from the Fond du Lac 1st district January 5, 1885 – January 3, 1887	Succeeded by George H. Ferris
Political offices
Preceded by Philomen Wicks	Mayor of Ripon, Wisconsin; April 1896 – April 1897	Succeeded by George L. Field
