= New York State Route 177 =

Highway in New York

New York State Route 177
- Map of Jefferson and Lewis counties with NY 177 highlighted in red

Route information
- Maintained by NYSDOT
- Length: 25.71 mi (41.38 km)
- Existed: 1930–present

Major junctions
- West end: I-81 in Adams
- East end: NY 12 in Lowville town

Location
- Country: United States
- State: New York
- Counties: Jefferson, Lewis

Highway system
- New York Highways; Interstate; US; State; Reference; Parkways
← NY 176	→ NY 178

New York State Route 177 (NY 177) is an east–west state highway in the North Country of New York in the United States. It extends from Interstate 81 (I-81) exit 147 (formerly 42) in the Jefferson County town of Adams to NY 12 west of the Lewis County village of Lowville. NY 177 intersects U.S. Route 11 (US 11) in Adams Center and meets Lewis County's County Route 21 (CR 21), formerly part of NY 194, at Barnes Corners. NY 177 originally began at US 11 when it was assigned in 1930. It was extended west to its present terminus in the 1950s following the construction of I-81.

== Route description ==
NY 177 begins at interchange 147 (formerly 42) on I-81 in the town of Adams. The route progresses away from the interstate to the southeast, passing the former railroad station in Adams Center before intersecting with US 11 in the center of the hamlet. At this intersection, NY 177 turns eastward, leaving the populated hamlet for a rural backdrop and into the hamlet of Honeyville. Honeyville consists of little more than a few houses centered on the intersection of NY 177 and Fuller Road. After leaving Honeyville, NY 177 intersects with CR 155, where it turns to the southeast into the town of Rodman. After crossing a creek, the route enters the hamlet of Rodman as a two-lane road through the southern end of the hamlet. During the stretch around Rodman, NY 177 intersects with CR 85 (Creek Road) and CR 97 (Washington Park Road / School Street) before leaving the hamlet.

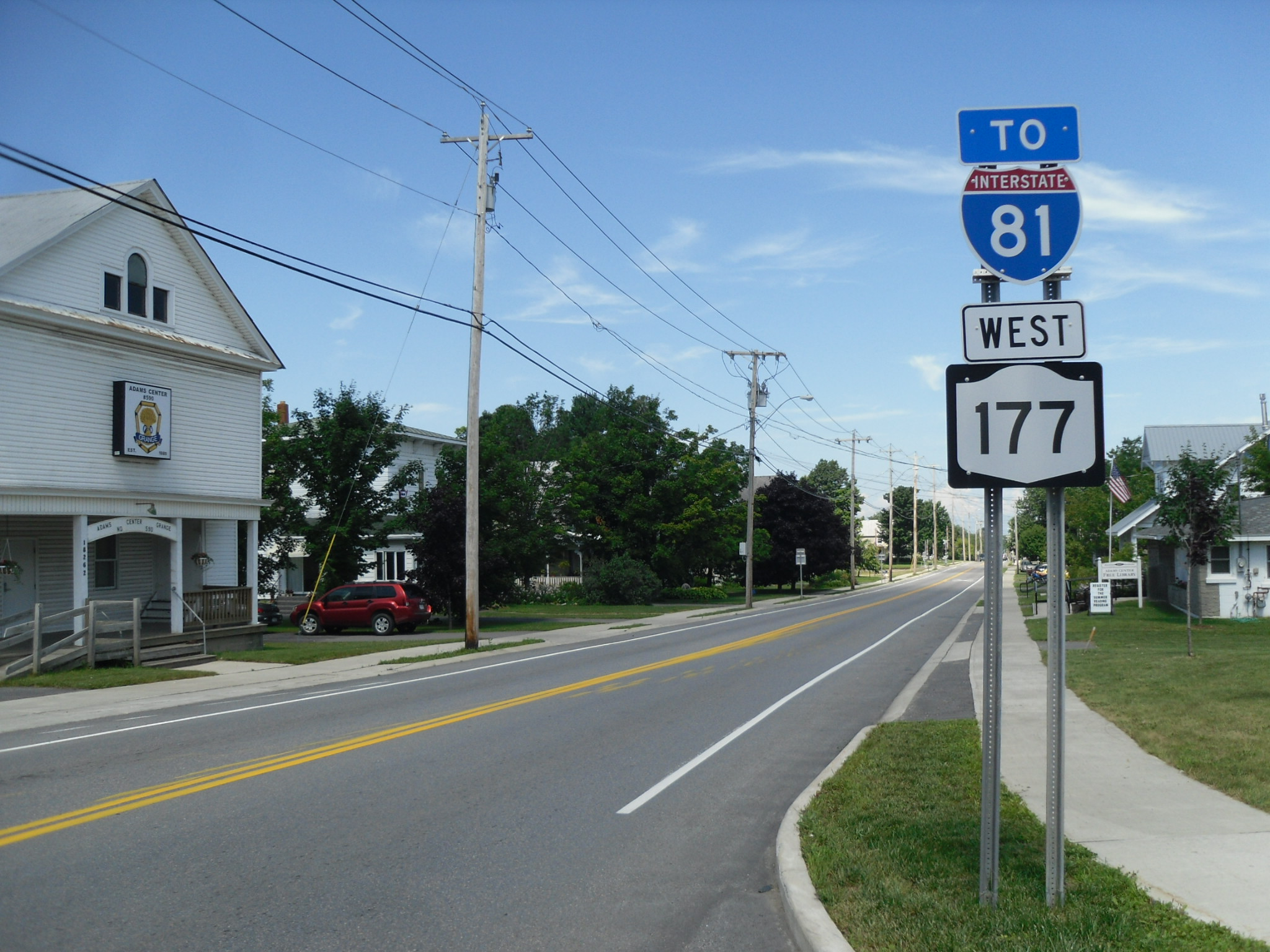
NY 177 heading westbound through Adams Center towards I-81

NY 177 continues winding itself to the southeast through the town of Rodman, as a rural two-lane highway. After Williams Road, the route makes several bends in to the south and east, straightening out eastward at an intersection with the northern terminus of CR 95. This eastward progression remains stagnant as NY 177 continues eastward past CR 189. After a short, empty stretch of roadway, NY 177 crosses the county line into Lewis County, where it enters the town of Pinckney. Through Pinckney, the route turns to the northeast, crossing Old State Road before bending and turning southeastward into the hamlet of Barnes Corners. In Barnes Corners, the dense forest retreats for a rural community, where NY 177 intersects with CR 21 and CR 2 (Seven-by-Nine Road). CR 21 is the former southern terminus of NY 194, a designation eliminated in 1980.

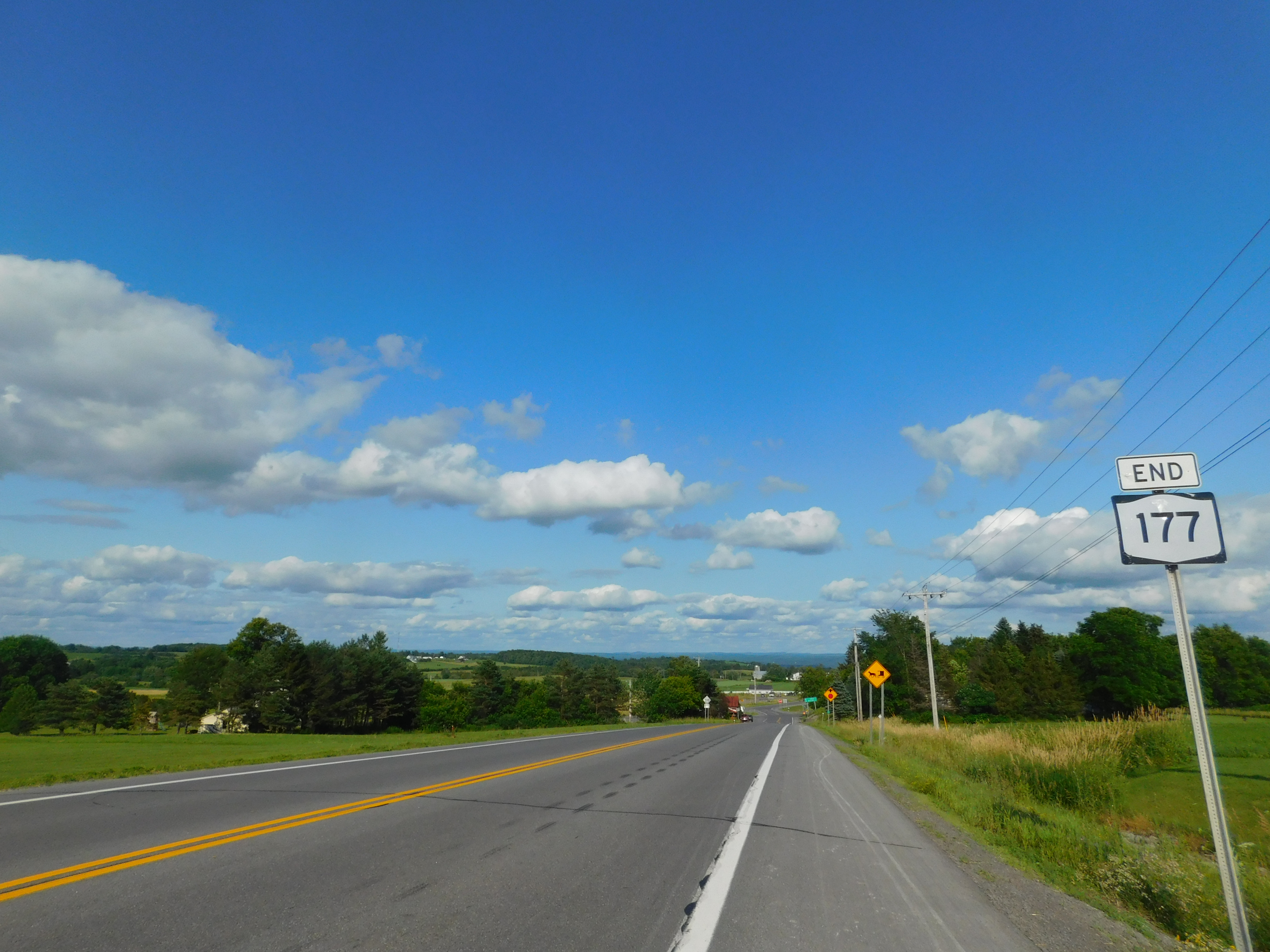
NY 177 entering the hamlet of West Lowville and approaching the terminus at NY 12

After leaving Barnes Corners, NY 177 returns to being the two-lane rural roadway, progressing southeastward through the town of Pinckney. Despite the rural scenery, the route does enter the hamlet of New Boston and the junction with CR 23 (Liberty Road). Passing a few farms, the route turns to the northeast near Mile Square Road, and enters the hamlet of Bellwood, within the town of Harrisburg. Bellwood consists of a few houses and an intersection with CR 27 and CR 28 (Sears Pond Road). Leaving Bellwood, NY 177 continues eastward into the hamlet of Windecker, which consists only of a few houses. Leaving Windecker, NY 177 bends to the southeast and enters the town of Lowville, passing a few farms and wind turbines before bending into the hamlet of West Lowville. In West Lowville, NY 177 intersects with NY 12, which continues eastward to the village of Lowville. NY 177 terminates at this intersection.

== History ==
NY 177 was assigned as part of the 1930 renumbering of state highways in New York. It originally extended from US 11 in Adams Center to NY 12 west of the village of Lowville. When the portion of I-81 near Adams Center was completed in the late 1950s, NY 177 was extended westward over a county-maintained highway to meet the new expressway at exit 147 (formerly 42). On August 1, 1979, ownership and maintenance of NY 177 between I-81 and US 11 was transferred from Jefferson County to the state of New York as part of a highway maintenance swap between the two levels of government.

== Major intersections ==
County	Location	mi	km	Destinations	Notes
Jefferson	Town of Adams	0.00	0.00	I-81	Western terminus; exit 147 (I-81)
Jefferson	Town of Adams	0.83	1.34	US 11	Hamlet of Adams Center
Lewis	Pinckney	11.69	18.81	CR 2 / CR 21 – Copenhagen	Hamlet of Barnes Corners; western terminus of former NY 194
Lewis	Town of Lowville	25.71	41.38	NY 12 – Lowville, Watertown	Eastern terminus; Hamlet of West Lowville
1.000 mi = 1.609 km; 1.000 km = 0.621 mi
