= Barnes Corners, New York =

Barnes Corners may refer to a hamlet in the U.S. state of New York:

- Barnes Corners in the town of Triangle, New York, in Broome County
- Barnes Corners in the town of Pinckney, New York, in Lewis County
