= Ken Blankenbush =

American politician (born 1947)

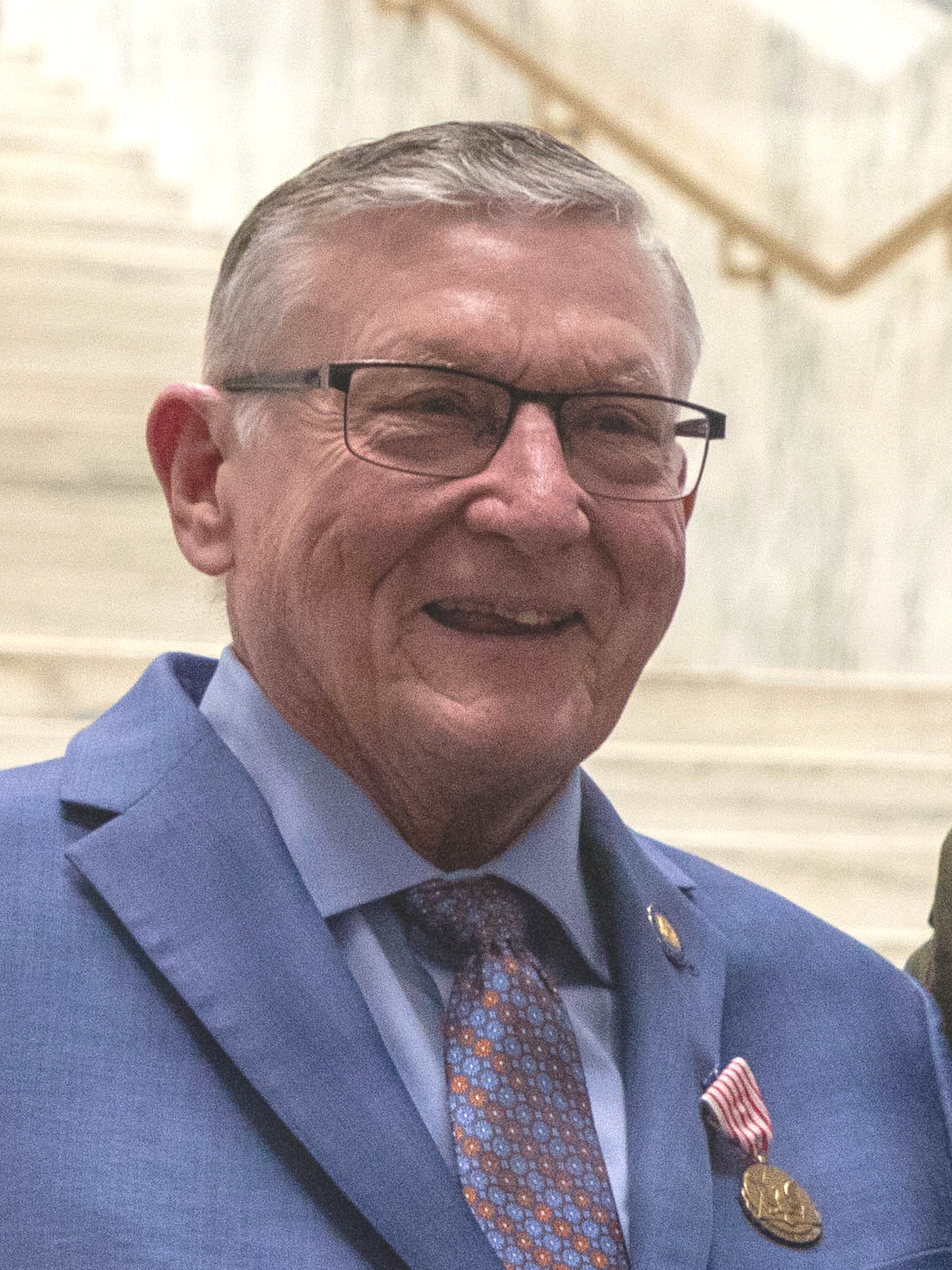
- Blankenbush in 2026

Member of the New York State Assembly from the 117th district
- Incumbent
- Assumed office January 1, 2011
- Preceded by: Dede Scozzafava
- Succeeded by: Tammie Nabywaniec (elect)

Personal details
- Born: September 14, 1947 (age 79) Wilkes Barre, Pennsylvania, U.S.
- Party: Republican
- Spouse: Sheila
- Children: 2
- Education: SUNY Plattsburgh
- Profession: politician
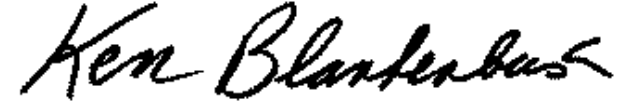
- Signature
- Website: Official website

Kenneth D. Blankenbush (born September 14, 1947) is an American politician and a Republican member of the New York State Assembly.

He succeeded former assemblywoman Dede Scozzafava, a liberal Republican who retired. Blankenbush is a longtime resident of Black River. His district includes Lewis County and parts of Oswego, Saint Lawrence and Jefferson Counties.

Blankenbush graduated from Rush-Henrietta High School in Henrietta, New York. Upon completing two years at Monroe Community College, he earned a Bachelor of Science degree in history from the State University of New York at Plattsburgh. He served in the United States Air Force from 1968 to 1976, during that he was deployed and served in Vietnam and was then stationed at Plattsburgh Air Force Base.

In 1976, Blankenbush began his professional career with Metropolitan Life Insurance Company and worked his way up to branch manager of the regional office in Watertown. After a successful tenure at Metropolitan, he left to start BEL Associates, his own insurance and financial services business in Watertown.

A town councilman for the town of Le Ray for eight years, Blankenbush went on to serve his community as a member of the Jefferson County Board of Legislators, and served two terms as chairman.

In November 2010, he was elected to the State Assembly. As his district is heavily Republican, his initial election in 2010 is the only time he has even faced an opponent. He has subsequently been re-elected unopposed.

New York State Assembly
Preceded by Dede Scozzafava	New York State Assembly, 122nd District; January 1, 2011 – present	Incumbent
