= Tammie Nabywaniec =

American politician

Member-elect of the New York State Assembly from the 117th district
- Assuming office January 2027
- Succeeding: Ken Blankenbush

Personal details
- Party: Republican

Tammie Nabywaniec is an American politician. A member of the Republican Party, she is the member-elect for the 117th district of the New York State Assembly.
