= Harrisburg, New York =

Harrisburg, New York Harrisburgh
- Town
- Location within New York Location within the United States
- Coordinates: 43°49′2″N 75°39′4″W
- Country: United States
- State: New York
- County: Lewis

Area
  - Total: 39.91 sq mi (103.37 km^{2})
  - Land: 39.88 sq mi (103.29 km^{2})
  - Water: 0.027 sq mi (0.07 km^{2})
- Elevation: 1,578 ft (481 m)

Population (2010)
  - Total: 437
  - Estimate (2016): 435
  - Density: 10.9/sq mi (4.21/km^{2})
- Time zone: UTC-5 (Eastern (EST))
  - Summer (DST): UTC-4 (EDT)
- ZIP Codes: 13626 (Copenhagen); 13367 (Lowville)
- Area code: 315
- FIPS code: 36-049-32358
- GNIS feature ID: 979051

Harrisburg is a rural small town in Lewis County, New York, United States. The population was 437 at the 2010 census. The town is in the northwestern part of the county, northwest of Lowville, the county seat.

== History ==
Settlement began before 1812.

The town of Harrisburg (originally "Harrisburgh") was formed in 1803 from the towns of Lowville, Champion (in Jefferson County), and Mexico (in Oswego County). After its formation, Harrisburg gave up land to form the town of Denmark (1807) and the town of Pinckney (1808).

== Geography ==
According to the United States Census Bureau, the town has a total area of 39.9 square miles (103 km^{2}), of which 0.03 square miles (0.08 km^{2}), or 0.08%, are water.

New York State Route 177 crosses the town (east-west), and New York State Route 26 passes along the eastern part of the town. New York State Route 12 is an east–west highway through the middle of Harrisburg.

The Deer River flows northward from the northwestern section of Harrisburg.

== Demographics ==
Historical population
Census	Pop.	Note	%±
1820	520		—
1830	712		36.9%
1840	850		19.4%
1850	1,367		60.8%
1860	1,338		−2.1%
1870	1,090		−18.5%
1880	1,089		−0.1%
1890	816		−25.1%
1900	770		−5.6%
1910	686		−10.9%
1920	619		−9.8%
1930	589		−4.8%
1940	537		−8.8%
1950	480		−10.6%
1960	423		−11.9%
1970	431		1.9%
1980	418		−3.0%
1990	425		1.7%
2000	423		−0.5%
2010	437		3.3%
2016 (est.)	435		−0.5%
U.S. Decennial Census

As of the census of 2000, there were 423 people, 139 households, and 102 families residing in the town. The population density was 10.6 inhabitants per square mile (4.1/km^{2}). There were 201 housing units at an average density of 5.0 per square mile (1.9/km^{2}). The racial makeup of the town was 98.11% White, 0.47% African American, 0.24% Native American, 0.47% Asian, 0.24% Pacific Islander, and 0.47% from two or more races. Hispanic or Latino of any race were 0.24% of the population.

There were 139 households, out of which 38.8% had children under the age of 18 living with them, 66.2% were married couples living together, 5.0% had a female householder with no husband present, and 26.6% were non-families. 25.2% of all households were made up of individuals, and 6.5% had someone living alone who was 65 years of age or older. The average household size was 3.04 and the average family size was 3.73.

In the town, the population was spread out, with 33.6% under the age of 18, 6.6% from 18 to 24, 27.4% from 25 to 44, 23.9% from 45 to 64, and 8.5% who were 65 years of age or older. The median age was 35 years. For every 100 females, there were 112.6 males. For every 100 females age 18 and over, there were 123.0 males.

The median income for a household in the town was $30,750, and the median income for a family was $37,250. Males had a median income of $23,125 versus $21,071 for females. The per capita income for the town was $13,785. About 11.9% of families and 13.6% of the population were below the poverty line, including 21.0% of those under age 18 and 12.9% of those age 65 or over.

== Communities and locations in Harrisburg ==
- Bellwood – A hamlet on NY-177 in the southwestern part of the town.
- Harrisburg – The hamlet of Harrisburg is on NY-12 in the northeastern part of the town.
- Windecker – A hamlet on NY-177 in the southeastern section of the town.
