= Pinckney Corners Cemetery =

Historic cemetery in New York, United States

- U.S. National Register of Historic Places
- Location within New York Location within the United States
- Location: Pinckney Rd., near Copenhagen, New York
- Coordinates: 43°52′03″N 75°43′29″W
- Area: 0.48 acres (0.19 ha)
- Built: 1810
- NRHP reference No.: 14000578
- Added to NRHP: September 10, 2014

Pinckney Corners Cemetery is a historic cemetery located near Copenhagen in Lewis County, New York. It was established in 1810. It contains approximately 240 marked burials dating from 1810 to 1901. It is the final resting place of many early settlers of the region. Those buried include veterans of the Revolutionary War and the War of 1812.

It was listed on the National Register of Historic Places in 2014.
