= Ladoga, Wisconsin =

- Unincorporated community
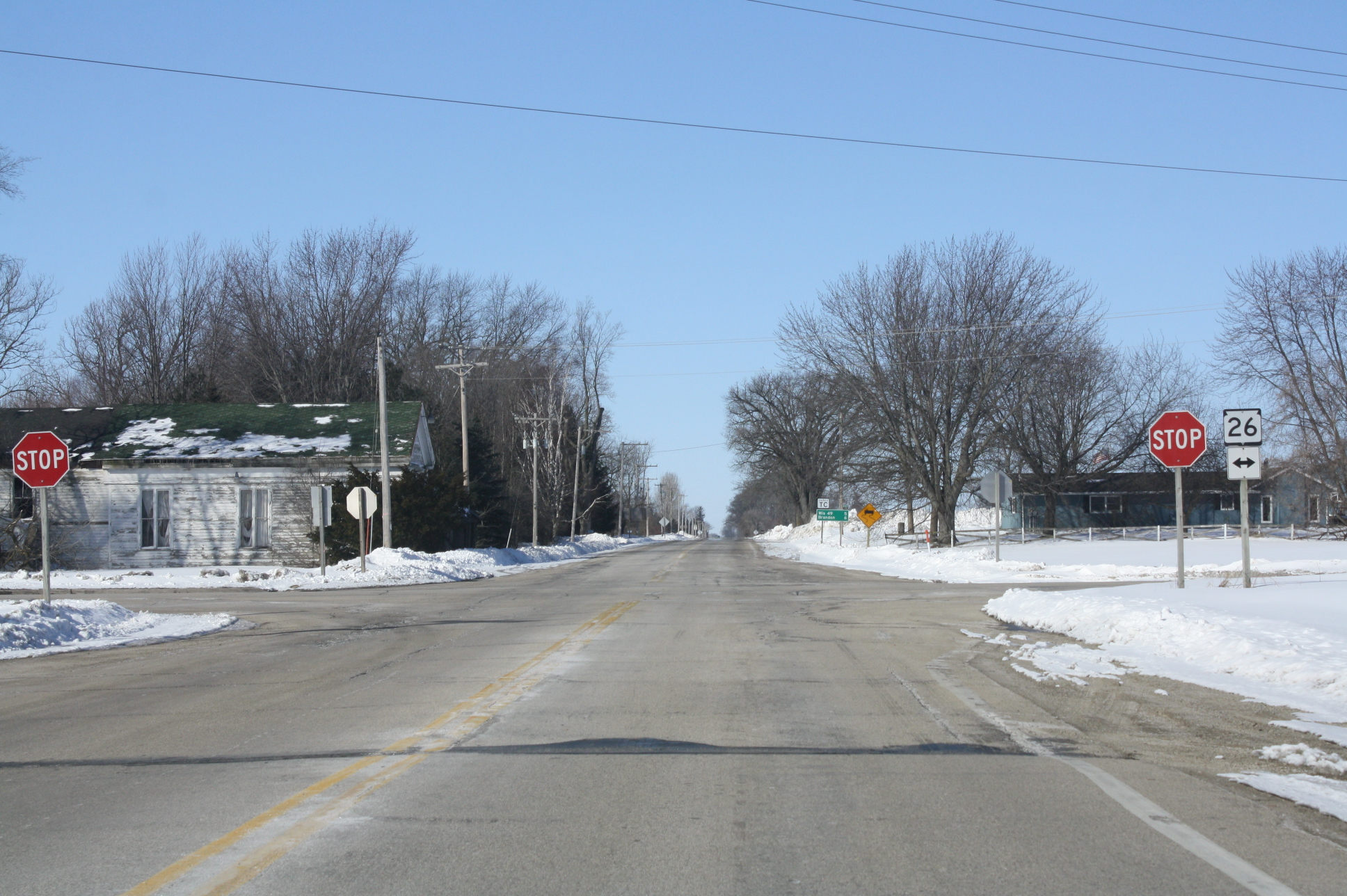
- Looking west at the center of Ladoga

- Location within Wisconsin Location within the United States
- Coordinates: 43°43′12″N 88°40′27″W
- Country: United States
- State: Wisconsin
- County: Fond du Lac
- Elevation: 899 ft (274 m)
- Time zone: UTC-6 (Central (CST))
  - Summer (DST): UTC-5 (CDT)
- Area code: 920
- GNIS feature ID: 1567713

Ladoga is an unincorporated community located in the towns of Springvale and Waupun, Fond du Lac County, Wisconsin, United States.

== History ==
Ladoga means "rising sun" in a Native American language.

The post office was opened in July 1851 by its first postmaster, Marcus Brown.

== Notable people ==
- Chester Hazen, businessman, farmer, and politician

== Images ==
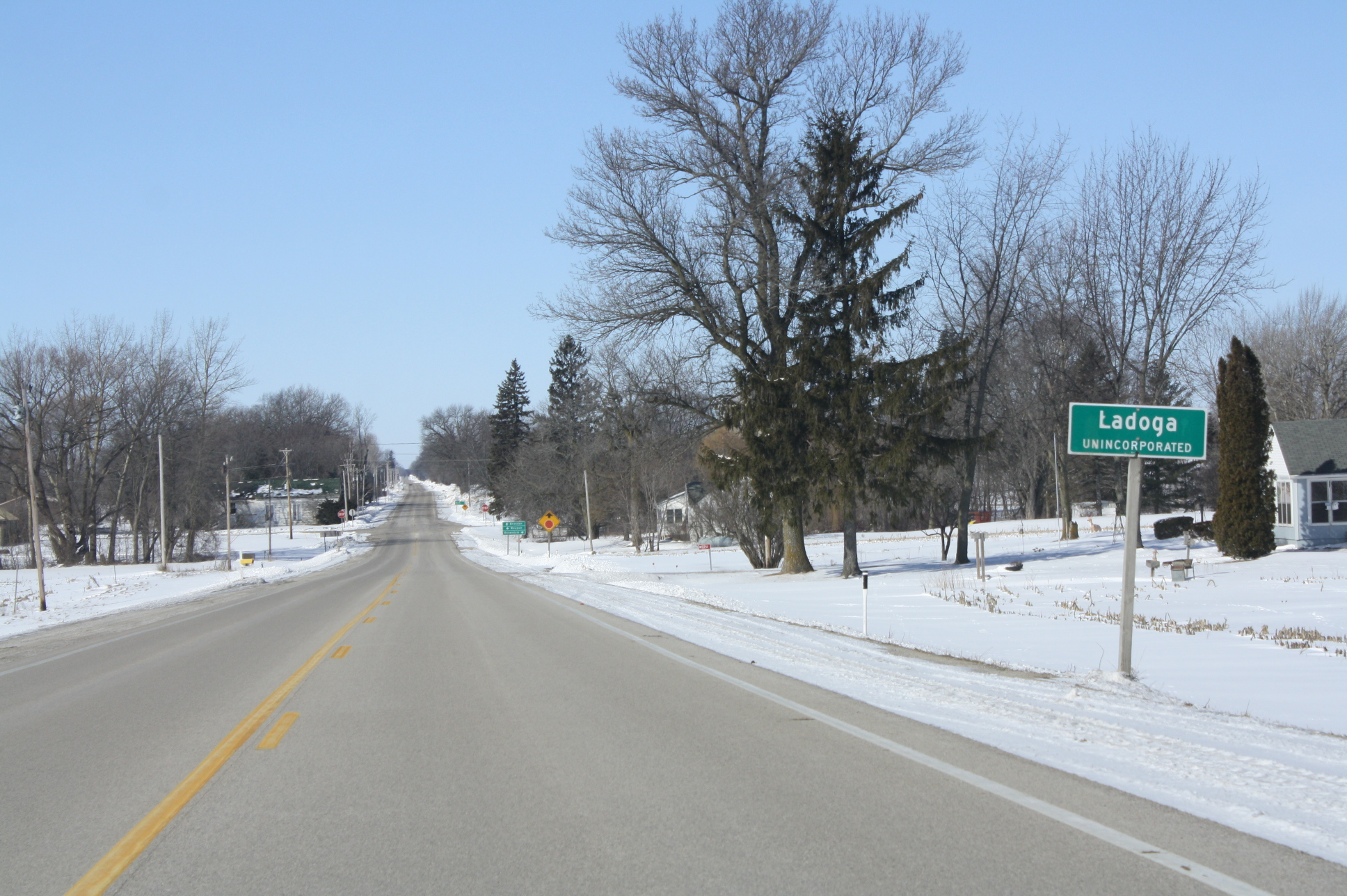
Sign looking west

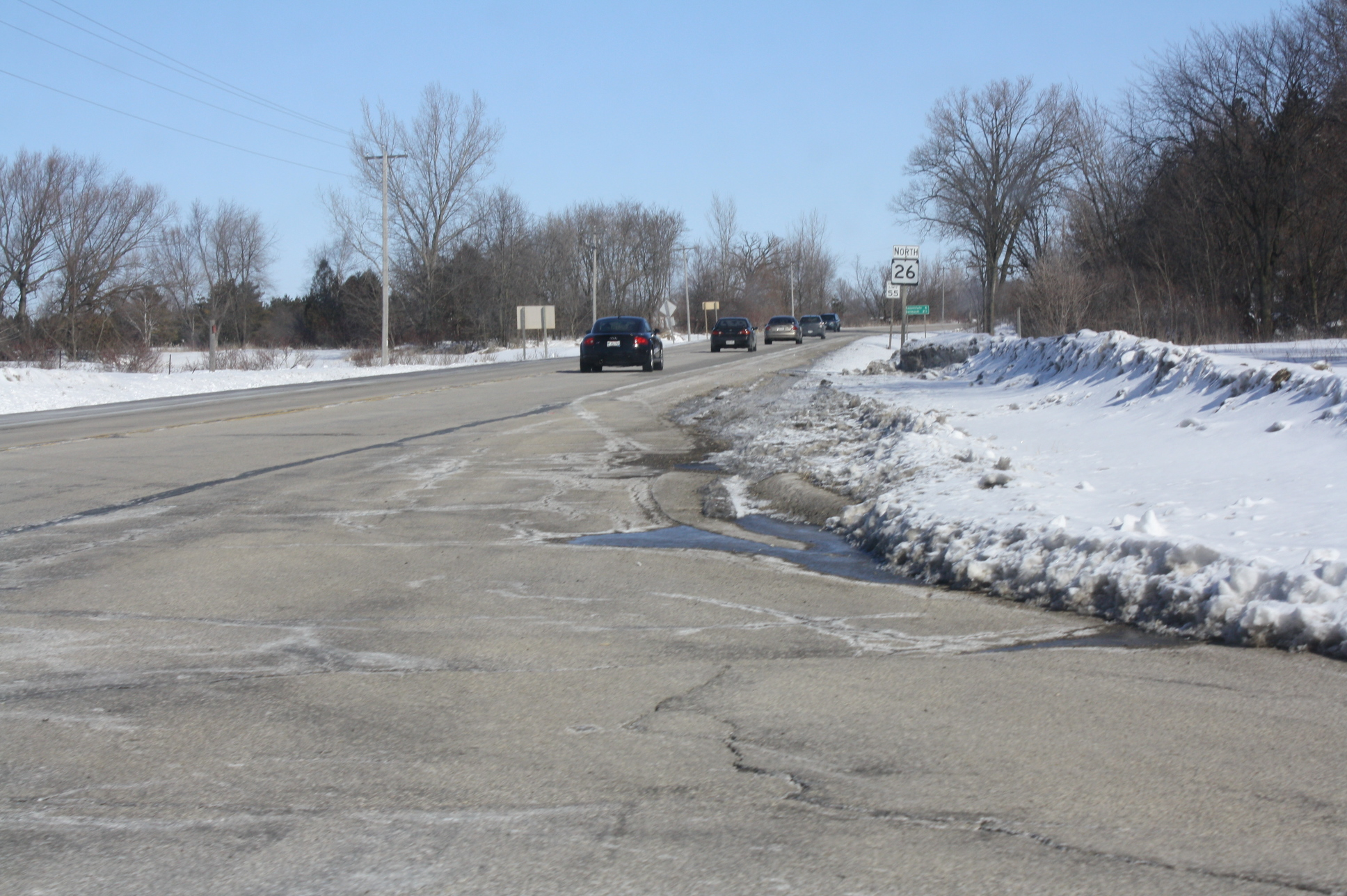
Looking north at WIS26
