= William D. Turner =

American politician

William Wallace Davenport Turner (June 1, 1836 – April 2, 1905) was a member of the Wisconsin State Assembly.

== Biography ==
Turner was born on June 1, 1836, in Quincy, Illinois. During the American Civil War, he served with the 20th Missouri Volunteer Infantry Regiment of the Union Army, achieving the rank of colonel. Engagements he took part in include the Siege of Vicksburg. After the war, Turner lived for a time in Mobile, Alabama, before moving to Ripon, Wisconsin, in 1877. He later lived in Spokane, Washington, and Bozeman, Montana, where he was president of the Yellowstone Park railway. He died in Los Angeles on April 2, 1905.

== Political career ==
Turner was a member of the Assembly in 1883. He had been City Attorney of Ripon for two terms. Additionally, Turner was City Attorney of Mobile and a candidate for the United States House of Representatives from Alabama's 1st congressional district in 1876, losing to James T. Jones. He was a Republican.
