= Lowville, New York =

- Town
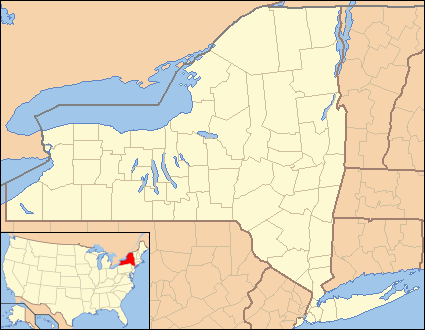
- Location within the state of New York
- Coordinates: 43°47′12″N 075°29′32″W
- Country: United States
- State: New York
- County: Lewis
- Settled: 1797
- Established: 1800

Area
  - Total: 38.12 sq mi (98.74 km^{2})
  - Land: 37.83 sq mi (97.99 km^{2})
  - Water: 0.29 sq mi (0.75 km^{2})
- Elevation: 1,240 ft (380 m)

Population (2020)
  - Total: 4,888
  - Estimate (2016): 5,233
  - Density: 129.9/sq mi (50.16/km^{2})
- Time zone: UTC-5 (Eastern (EST))
  - Summer (DST): UTC-4 (EDT)
- ZIP code: 13367
- Area code: 315
- FIPS code: 36-049-43731
- GNIS feature ID: 979171
- Website: townoflowvilleny.gov

Lowville /ˈlaʊvɪl/ is a town in Lewis County, New York, United States. The population was 4,888 at the 2020 census, down from 4,982 in 2010. The town is near the center of the county and is southeast of the city of Watertown. The town of Lowville contains a village also named Lowville, which is the county seat. The town is named after Nicholas Low, an early landowner. Low was of Dutch descent, and had emigrated with his wife and three small children from a rural village outside Amsterdam in 1778. Despite popular folk etymology, the name Lowville has nothing to do with its low elevation or the lowing cattle of the many nearby dairy farms.

== History ==
Settled in 1798 by a company from Westfield, Massachusetts, the town was formed in 1800 from the town of Mexico in Oswego County. In 1803, part of Lowville was used to form the town of Harrisburg. The village of Lowville was incorporated in 1854 and was designated the county seat in 1864, succeeding Martinsburg.

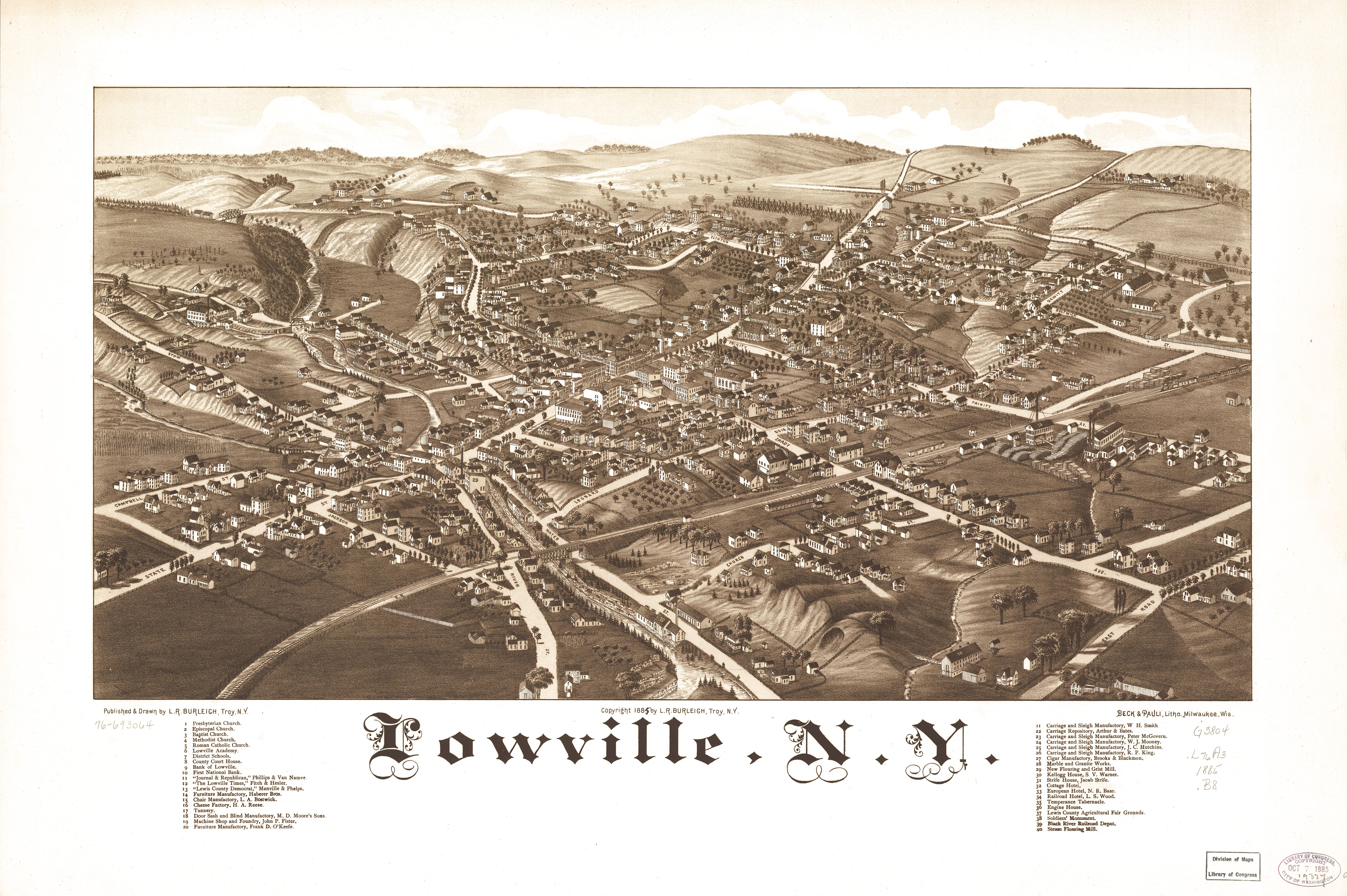
Perspective map of Lowville and list of landmarks from 1885 by L.R. Burleigh

Daniel Kelley, along with his six sons, settled in Lowville in 1798, moving from Middletown, Connecticut. With the help of others, Daniel put up a sawmill and a two-story house. One son, Datus, worked in the mill. In 1867, Datus' daughter Emeline (Kelley) Huntington wrote: "By a little brook which comes down from the long hills which rise almost like mountains on either side of the Black River, stands the same old mill where Father ground the wheat and corn for the country people. Its wheel is dripping and clattering still, doing duty as faithfully as of old. While the old miller who 'picked the stones and calked the gate' when the mill was new, has laid away his earthly casket in the little burying ground far away from the roar of the water which is constantly pouring over the mill dam."

In 1810 Datus married Sara Dean and moved to Rockport, Ohio. Datus and Sara then bought Kelleys Island in Lake Erie (Ohio) and founded the community called Kelley's Island.

Agriculture and dairy farming flourished in the Lowville area because of the rich soil on the Black River Flats. With the opening of the Black River Canal in 1851, the Rome, Watertown and Ogdensburg Railroad in 1867, and the Lowville and Beaver Railroad in 1906, industries flourished, including QubicaAMF (largest manufacturer of bowling pins in the world) and Kraft (the largest cream cheese plant in the country).

Dedicated in 2006, the Maple Ridge Wind Farm is one of the largest wind farms in the United States. The site has 195 wind turbines, with a total capacity of 320MW (equivalent to a mid-sized power plant). Maple Ridge (formerly Flat Rock Wind Farm) provides about $10 million in benefit to the local community, with about $2 million in annual payments to 75 landowners, and $8 million in tax revenues to the region. This site has increased New York's renewable energy generation by sixfold. The project is jointly owned by Iberdrola Renewables and EDP Renewables North America (formerly Horizon Wind Energy).

Peter Ostrum, who played the role of Charlie Bucket in Willy Wonka and the Chocolate Factory, lives in and practices veterinary medicine in Lowville.

== Geography ==
According to the United States Census Bureau, the town has a total area of 38.1 square miles (99 km^{2}), of which 37.8 square miles (98 km^{2}) are land and 0.3 square miles (0.78 km^{2}), or 0.79%, are water.

New York State Route 177 ends at New York State Route 12 in Lowville. West-south highways New York State Route 26 and New York State Route 812 also pass through the town.

The Black River flows along the eastern side of the town.

== Climate ==
Lowville has a humid continental climate (Köppen Dfb). The warmest month is July and the coldest month is January. Winters have extensive snowfall due to the proximity to Lake Ontario.

Climate data for Lowville, New York (1991–2020 normals, extremes 1892–present)
Month	Jan	Feb	Mar	Apr	May	Jun	Jul	Aug	Sep	Oct	Nov	Dec	Year
Record high °F (°C)	64 (18)	66 (19)	81 (27)	89 (32)	92 (33)	99 (37)	100 (38)	98 (37)	95 (35)	87 (31)	77 (25)	67 (19)	100 (38)
Mean maximum °F (°C)	50.4 (10.2)	48.4 (9.1)	59.6 (15.3)	75.4 (24.1)	83.2 (28.4)	87.1 (30.6)	88.4 (31.3)	87.8 (31.0)	84.5 (29.2)	75.9 (24.4)	65.1 (18.4)	53.2 (11.8)	90.1 (32.3)
Mean daily maximum °F (°C)	26.6 (−3.0)	28.8 (−1.8)	37.5 (3.1)	52.0 (11.1)	65.8 (18.8)	74.0 (23.3)	78.4 (25.8)	77.2 (25.1)	70.1 (21.2)	56.7 (13.7)	44.0 (6.7)	32.5 (0.3)	53.6 (12.0)
Daily mean °F (°C)	17.3 (−8.2)	19.1 (−7.2)	28.0 (−2.2)	41.8 (5.4)	54.5 (12.5)	63.4 (17.4)	67.8 (19.9)	66.2 (19.0)	58.6 (14.8)	47.1 (8.4)	35.7 (2.1)	24.7 (−4.1)	43.7 (6.5)
Mean daily minimum °F (°C)	8.0 (−13.3)	9.4 (−12.6)	18.5 (−7.5)	31.6 (−0.2)	43.2 (6.2)	52.7 (11.5)	57.3 (14.1)	55.2 (12.9)	47.2 (8.4)	37.5 (3.1)	27.5 (−2.5)	16.8 (−8.4)	33.7 (1.0)
Mean minimum °F (°C)	−18.4 (−28.0)	−12.7 (−24.8)	−4.3 (−20.2)	18.6 (−7.4)	29.7 (−1.3)	39.6 (4.2)	46.4 (8.0)	43.1 (6.2)	32.6 (0.3)	23.8 (−4.6)	9.8 (−12.3)	−8.1 (−22.3)	−21.5 (−29.7)
Record low °F (°C)	−37 (−38)	−36 (−38)	−25 (−32)	4 (−16)	20 (−7)	28 (−2)	35 (2)	29 (−2)	22 (−6)	9 (−13)	−15 (−26)	−40 (−40)	−40 (−40)
Average precipitation inches (mm)	3.47 (88)	2.59 (66)	2.65 (67)	3.11 (79)	3.39 (86)	3.72 (94)	3.48 (88)	3.80 (97)	3.49 (89)	4.56 (116)	3.75 (95)	3.82 (97)	41.83 (1,062)
Average snowfall inches (cm)	35.6 (90)	29.6 (75)	15.8 (40)	4.1 (10)	0.2 (0.51)	0.0 (0.0)	0.0 (0.0)	0.0 (0.0)	0.0 (0.0)	0.4 (1.0)	9.4 (24)	31.9 (81)	127.0 (323)
Average extreme snow depth inches (cm)	15.9 (40)	17.1 (43)	13.4 (34)	4.0 (10)	0.1 (0.25)	0.0 (0.0)	0.0 (0.0)	0.0 (0.0)	0.0 (0.0)	0.5 (1.3)	4.8 (12)	12.9 (33)	21.8 (55)
Average precipitation days (≥ 0.01 in)	18.1	15.1	13.4	13.6	13.3	12.2	10.9	10.7	11.5	14.3	14.9	18.0	166.0
Average snowy days (≥ 0.1 in)	16.4	13.9	9.1	3.1	0.2	0.0	0.0	0.0	0.0	0.4	5.2	12.8	61.1
Source 1: NOAA
Source 2: National Weather Service

== Demographics ==
Historical population
Census	Pop.	Note	%±
1820	1,943		—
1830	2,334		20.1%
1840	2,047		−12.3%
1850	2,377		16.1%
1860	2,373		−0.2%
1870	2,805		18.2%
1880	3,188		13.7%
1890	3,634		14.0%
1900	3,746		3.1%
1910	3,875		3.4%
1920	3,915		1.0%
1930	4,336		10.8%
1940	4,586		5.8%
1950	4,623		0.8%
1960	4,635		0.3%
1970	4,754		2.6%
1980	4,575		−3.8%
1990	4,849		6.0%
2000	4,548		−6.2%
2010	4,982		9.5%
2020	4,888		−1.9%
U.S. Decennial Census

As of the census of 2000, there were 4,548 people, 1,796 households, and 1,172 families residing in the town. The population density was 120.3 inhabitants per square mile (46.4/km^{2}). There were 2,033 housing units at an average density of 53.8 units per square mile (20.8 units/km^{2}).

There were 1,796 households, out of which 32.6% had children under the age of 18 living with them, 52.3% were married couples living together, 9.9% had a female householder with no husband present, and 34.7% were non-families. 31.2% of all households were made up of individuals, and 17.5% had someone living alone who was 65 years of age or older. The average household size was 2.42 and the average family size was 3.04.

In the town, the population was spread out, with 26.0% under the age of 18, 6.9% from 18 to 24, 25.5% from 25 to 44, 20.8% from 45 to 64, and 20.8% who were 65 years of age or older. The median age was 40 years. For every 100 females, there were 87.4 males. For every 100 females age 18 and over, there were 82.3 males.

The median income for a household in the town was $32,396, and the median income for a family was $42,358. Males had a median income of $32,375 versus $21,181 for females. The per capita income for the town was $16,659. About 13.3% of families and 13.9% of the population were below the poverty line, including 17.9% of those under age 18 and 14.6% of those age 65 or over.

Currently, the District Attorney (DA) Is Leanne Moser. (2 Term) The County Judge is Daniel King.

== Festivals and annual events in Lowville ==
Every year, there is a festival to celebrate the home of the World's Largest Cheesecake, made in Lowville, by Kraft.

== Communities and locations in the town of Lowville ==
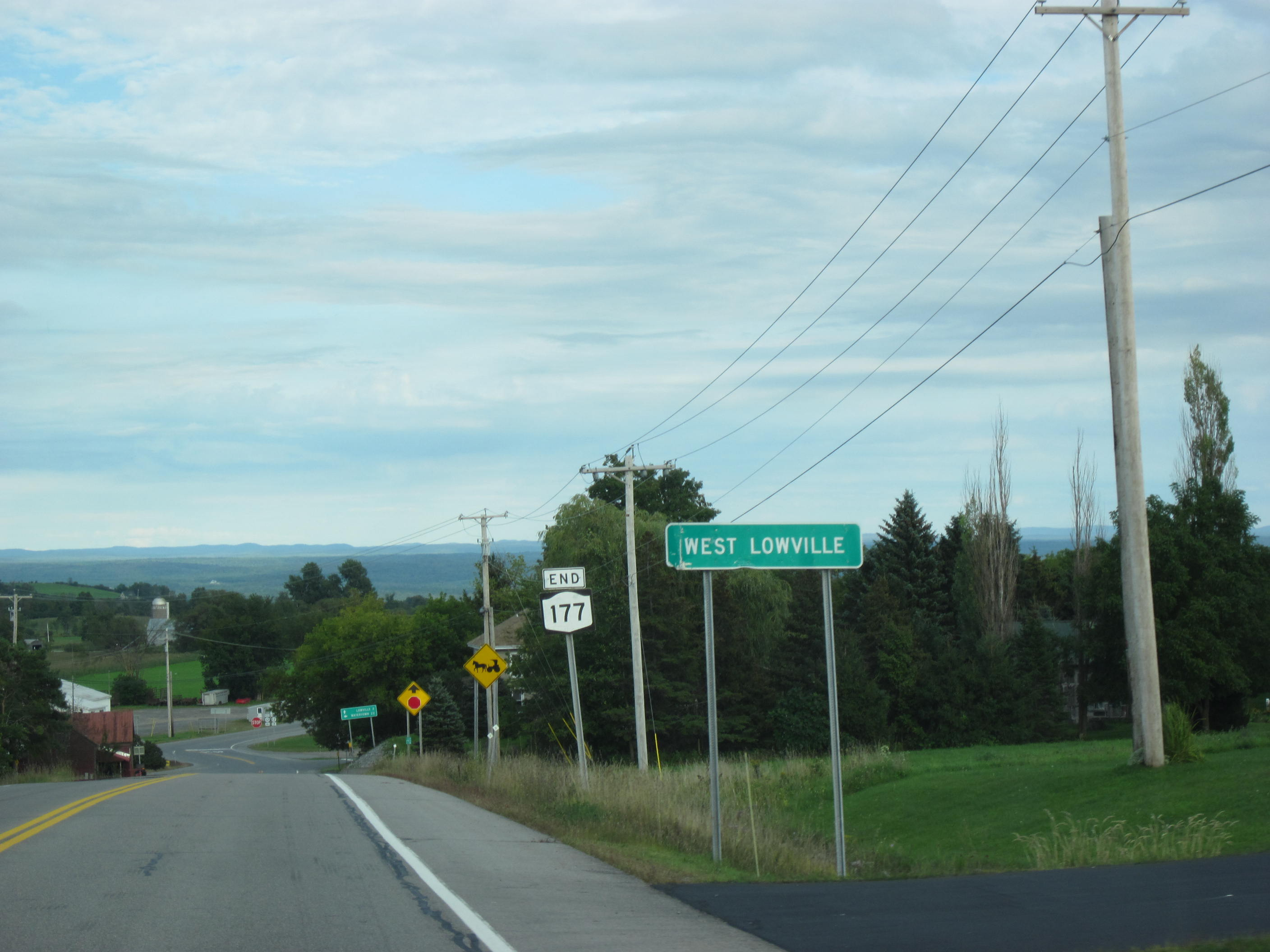
West Lowville as seen from NY 177 east

- Dadville – A hamlet northeast of Lowville village on NY-812 and the Black River.
- Lowville – A village in the eastern part of the town.
- Mill Creek – A stream flowing eastward through Lowville village to the Black River.
- Smiths Landing – A former community on the shore of the Black River.
- Stows Square – A former community, once located north of Lowville village.
- West Lowville – A hamlet in the northwestern part of the town at the junction of Routes NY-12 and NY-177.
