= Denmark, New York =

- Town
- Location in New York Location in the United States
- Coordinates: 43°53′55″N 75°36′24″W
- Country: United States
- State: New York
- County: Lewis

Area
  - Total: 51.05 sq mi (132.21 km^{2})
  - Land: 50.60 sq mi (131.06 km^{2})
  - Water: 0.44 sq mi (1.15 km^{2})
- Elevation: 1,073 ft (327 m)

Population (2010)
  - Total: 2,860
  - Estimate (2016): 2,844
  - Density: 56/sq mi (21.7/km^{2})
- Time zone: UTC-5 (Eastern (EST))
  - Summer (DST): UTC-4 (EDT)
- ZIP Codes: 13631 (Denmark); 13620 (Castorland); 13626 (Copenhagen); 13627 (Deer River); 13619 (Carthage); 13367 (Lowville)
- Area code: 315
- FIPS code: 36-049-20214
- GNIS feature ID: 978896
- Website: townofdenmarkny.gov

Denmark is a town in Lewis County, New York, United States, named after the Kingdom of Denmark in northern Europe. The population was 2,626 at the 2020 census, down from 2,860 at the 2010 census. The town is on the northwestern border of Lewis County and lies east of Watertown.

== History ==
The town of Denmark was first settled around 1800.

The town was formed in 1807 from the town of Harrisburg.

== Notable people ==
- Moss Kent Dickinson, Canadian businessman, mayor of Ottawa, founder of the town of Manotick, and member of the Parliament of Canada
- Chester Hazen, American politician and businessman
- Albert Clark Wedge, American politician and physician

== Geography ==
According to the United States Census Bureau, the town has a total area of 51.0 square miles (132 km^{2}), of which 50.6 square miles (131 km^{2}) are land and 0.4 square miles (1.0 km^{2}) (0.84%) are water.

The northwestern town line is the border of Jefferson County, and the Black River forms the eastern town boundary. The Deer River, running through the northern part of the town, is a tributary of the Black River.

Both New York State Route 12 and New York State Route 26 run in a northwest to southeast direction through the town, paralleling the Black River. New York State Route 410 passes across the southeastern corner of the town.

== Demographics ==
Historical population
Census	Pop.	Note	%±
1820	1,745		—
1830	2,270		30.1%
1840	2,388		5.2%
1850	2,824		18.3%
1860	2,559		−9.4%
1870	2,109		−17.6%
1880	2,204		4.5%
1890	2,275		3.2%
1900	2,193		−3.6%
1910	1,889		−13.9%
1920	1,905		0.8%
1930	1,987		4.3%
1940	1,992		0.3%
1950	2,154		8.1%
1960	2,214		2.8%
1970	2,359		6.5%
1980	2,448		3.8%
1990	2,718		11.0%
2000	2,747		1.1%
2010	2,860		4.1%
2016 (est.)	2,844		−0.6%
U.S. Decennial Census

According to the census of the year 2000, there were 2,747 people, 977 households, and 753 families in the town of Denmark. The population density was 54.3 inhabitants per square mile (21.0/km^{2}). There were 1,149 housing units at an average density of 22.7 per square mile (8.8/km^{2}). The racial makeup of the town was 96.76% White, 0.51% African American, 0.25% Native American, 0.18% Asian, 0.04% Pacific Islander, 0.84% from other races, and 1.42% of two or more races. Hispanic or Latino of any race were 1.82% of the population.

There were 977 households, out of which 37.7% had children under the age of 18 living with them, 65.1% were married couples living together, 7.0% had a female householder with no husband present, and 22.9% were non-families. 17.7% of all households were made up of singles, and 7.8% had someone living alone who was 65 years of age or older. The average household size was 2.79 and the average family size was 3.15.

In the town, the population was spread out, with 28.7% under the age of 18, 9.6% from 18 to 24, 30.5% from 25 to 44, 21.4% from 45 to 64, and 9.8% who were 65 years of age or older. The median age was 33 years. For every 100 females, there were 103.5 males. For every 100 females age 18 and over, there were 98.5 males.

The median income for a household in the town was $38,696, and the median income for a family was $45,046. Males had a median income of $33,147 versus $22,375 for females. The per capita income for the town was $14,960. About 7.9% of families and 12.4% of the population were below the poverty line, including 17.3% of those under age 18 and 10.3% of those aged 65 or more.

== Communities and locations in Denmark ==
- Briggs Corners – A hamlet west of Castorland village on NY-410.
- Cameron Corners – A hamlet near the northern town line, east of Copenhagen village.
- Castorland – The village of Castorland is near the eastern town line on NY-410 and the Black River.
- Clark Corners – A hamlet southeast of Copenhagen on NY-12.
- Copenhagen – The village of Copenhagen is on NY-12 and the Deer River in the northwestern part of the town. It was formerly called "Munger Mills".
- Deer River – A hamlet north of Denmark village, formerly called Frenchs Mills. The community is located on NY-26 and the Deer River.
- Deer River Station – A location east of Deer River near the Black River.
- Denmark – The hamlet of Denmark on NY-26.
- High Falls – A waterfall south of Copenhagen on the Deer River.
- Kings Falls – A waterfall south of High Falls on the Deer River.
