= Deer River (Black River tributary) =

Tributary of the Black River in Lewis County, New York, United States

Location
- Country: United States
- State: New York

Physical characteristics
- Source
  - coordinates: 43°41′35″N 75°40′14″W
  - elevation: 1,900 ft (580 m)
- Mouth: Black River
  - location: Deer River, New York
  - coordinates: 43°56′13″N 75°34′05″W
  - elevation: 719 ft (219 m)
- Basin size: 95.4 mi^{2} (247 km^{2})

The Deer River is a 27-mile (43 km) long tributary of the Black River, in Lewis County, New York, in the United States. The river originates in the Tug Hill area and flows generally northeast, past Copenhagen, and under New York Route 26 to join the Black River approximately 3.5 miles (5.6 km) southeast of Carthage.

== See also ==
- List of rivers of New York
