= Pinckney, New York =

- Town
- Location within New York Location within the United States
- Coordinates: 43°50′3″N 75°47′16″W
- Country: United States
- State: New York
- County: Lewis

Area
  - Total: 41.12 sq mi (106.49 km^{2})
  - Land: 40.97 sq mi (106.12 km^{2})
  - Water: 0.14 sq mi (0.37 km^{2})
- Elevation: 1,480 ft (451 m)

Population (2020)
  - Total: 313
- Time zone: UTC-5 (Eastern (EST))
  - Summer (DST): UTC-4 (EDT)
- ZIP Codes: 13626 (Barnes Corners); 13601 (Watertown)
- FIPS code: 36-049-57925
- GNIS feature ID: 979367

Pinckney is a town in Lewis County, New York, United States. The population was 313 at the 2020 census. The town is named after Thomas Pinckney of South Carolina.

The town is on the western border of the county and is southeast of Watertown.

== History ==
The community was first settled circa 1804. The town of Pinckney was formed in 1808 from the towns of Harrisburgh and Rodman (then called "Harrison" in Jefferson County).

Early settlers were mostly farmers, who later changed to dairy and cheese production due to the snowy climate.

== Geography ==
According to the United States Census Bureau, the town has a total area of 41.1 square miles (106 km^{2}), of which 41.0 square miles (106 km^{2}) are land and 0.1 square miles (0.3 km^{2}), or 0.34%, are water.

The western part of the town is surrounded on three sides by Jefferson County.

New York State Route 177 is an east–west highway in the town.

The Deer River flows northward through the southeastern part of Pinckney.

== Demographics ==
Historical population
Census	Pop.	Note	%±
1820	507		—
1830	783		54.4%
1840	907		15.8%
1850	1,208		33.2%
1860	1,393		15.3%
1870	1,149		−17.5%
1880	1,152		0.3%
1890	1,004		−12.8%
1900	934		−7.0%
1910	806		−13.7%
1920	688		−14.6%
1930	646		−6.1%
1940	613		−5.1%
1950	439		−28.4%
1960	357		−18.7%
1970	319		−10.6%
1980	305		−4.4%
1990	323		5.9%
2000	319		−1.2%
2010	329		3.1%
2016 (est.)	323		−1.8%
U.S. Decennial Census

As of the census of 2000, there were 319 people, 120 households, and 81 families residing in the town. The population density was 7.8 inhabitants per square mile (3.0/km^{2}). There were 219 housing units at an average density of 5.3 per square mile (2.0/km^{2}). The racial makeup of the town was 96.55% White, 1.25% African American, 0.63% Native American, 0.31% Asian, and 1.25% from two or more races. Hispanic or Latino of any race were 0.94% of the population.

There were 120 households, out of which 35.0% had children under the age of 18 living with them, 57.5% were married couples living together, 7.5% had a female head of house with no husband present, and 31.7% were non-families. 20.8% of all households were made up of individuals, and 5.8% had someone living alone who was 65 years of age or older. The average household size was 2.66 and the average family size was 3.16.

In the town, the population was spread out, with 27.3% under the age of 18, 6.9% from 18 to 24, 29.8% from 25 to 44, 26.0% from 45 to 64, and 10.0% who were 65 years of age or older. The median age was 38 years. For every 100 females, there were 103.2 males. For every 100 females age 18 and over, there were 121.0 males.

According to 2023 census data, the median income for a household in the town was $82,188. Males had a median income of $28,750 versus $23,929 for females. The per capita income for the town was $42,978. About 8.5% of families and 14.0% of the population were below the poverty line, including 22.1% of those under age 18 and 14.7% of those age 65 or over.

== Communities and locations in Pinckney ==
- Barnes Corners – A hamlet in the southwestern part of the town on NY-177.
- Cronk Corners – A location north of Barnes Corners.
- Forks Number Two – A location northeast of Barnes Corners.
- Inman Gulf – A canyon in the western part of Pinckney.
- New Boston – A hamlet in the southeastern part of the town on NY-177 and the Deer River.
- Pinckney Corners – A location in the northeastern part of the town.
- Shingle Gulf – A canyon in the northwestern part of the town.
