= Copenhagen, New York =

Copenhagen, New York Mungers Mills
- Village
- Location within New York Location within the United States
- Coordinates: 43°53′35″N 75°40′21″W
- Country: United States
- State: New York
- County: Lewis
- Town: Denmark

Area
  - Total: 1.17 sq mi (3.04 km^{2})
  - Land: 1.17 sq mi (3.04 km^{2})
  - Water: 0 sq mi (0.00 km^{2})
- Elevation: 1,165 ft (355 m)

Population (2020)
  - Total: 631
  - Density: 536.8/sq mi (207.26/km^{2})
- Time zone: UTC-5 (Eastern (EST))
  - Summer (DST): UTC-4 (EDT)
- ZIP code: 13626
- Area code: 315
- FIPS code: 36-18135
- GNIS feature ID: 947413
- Website: https://copenhagen.racog.org/

Copenhagen is a village in Lewis County, New York, United States. The village is situated between Watertown and Lowville. The population was 631 at the 2020 census. The village is named after Copenhagen, the capital of Denmark.

Copenhagen is in the town of Denmark and is northwest of Lowville.

== History ==
Copenhagen was formerly known as "Mungers Mills" until 1807 when the locals elected to change their name to Copenhagen out of sympathy for the Danish capital, which was facing bombardment at the time by the British Royal Navy. Copenhagen was incorporated on February 22, 1896, and celebrated its 150th anniversary in August 2019 with 3 days of festivities.

Pinckney Corners Cemetery was listed on the National Register of Historic Places in 2014.

== Geography ==
Copenhagen is located in the western part of the town of Denmark in New York at 43°53′35″N 75°40′21″W (43.893078, -75.672474). According to the United States Census Bureau, the village has a total area of 1.2 square miles (3.0 km^{2}), all land. The Deer River, a tributary of the Black River, flows through the village. The river passes over High Falls at the eastern border of the village.

Copenhagen is on New York State Route 12, Main Street, south of the Jefferson County line. Route 12 leads northwest 14 miles (23 km) to Watertown and southeast 12 miles (19 km) to Lowville, the Lewis county seat.

== Demographics ==
Historical population
Census	Pop.	Note	%±
1870	575		—
1880	702		22.1%
1890	777		10.7%
1900	587		−24.5%
1910	585		−0.3%
1920	554		−5.3%
1930	539		−2.7%
1940	608		12.8%
1950	690		13.5%
1960	673		−2.5%
1970	734		9.1%
1980	656		−10.6%
1990	876		33.5%
2000	865		−1.3%
2010	801		−7.4%
2020	631		−21.2%
U.S. Decennial Census

As of the census of 2000, there were 865 people, 318 households, and 237 families residing in the village. The population density was 720.0 inhabitants per square mile (278.0/km^{2}). There were 383 housing units at an average density of 318.8 per square mile (123.1/km^{2}). The racial makeup of the village was 94.91% White, 1.27% African American, 0.23% Native American, 1.85% from other races, and 1.73% from two or more races. Hispanic or Latino of any race were 2.77% of the population.

There were 318 households, out of which 42.8% had children under the age of 18 living with them, 57.2% were married couples living together, 11.6% had a female householder with no husband present, and 25.2% were non-families. 21.4% of all households were made up of individuals, and 10.7% had someone living alone who was 65 years of age or older. The average household size was 2.72 and the average family size was 3.14.

31.8% of the population were aged under the age of 18, 13.3% from 18 to 24, 31.8% from 25 to 44, 15.1% from 45 to 64, and 8.0% who were 65 years of age or older. The median age was 28 years. For every 100 females, there were 97.5 males. For every 100 females age 18 and over, there were 91.6 males.

The median income for a household in the village was $32,273, and the median income for a family was $35,781. Males had a median income of $30,147 versus $25,156 for females. The per capita income for the village was $12,780. About 10.8% of families and 13.4% of the population were below the poverty line, including 19.0% of those under age 18 and 15.2% of those age 65 or over.

For the population 25 years and over in Copenhagen:

- High school or higher: 84.1%
- Bachelor's degree or higher: 9.7%
- Graduate or professional degree: 1.3%
- Unemployed: 9.4%
- Mean travel time to work: 22.7 minutes
- For population 15 years and over in Copenhagen village
- Never married: 24.1%
- Now married: 59.2%
- Separated: 4.4%
- Widowed: 6.2%
- Divorced: 6.2%

Population change in the 1990s: -14 (-1.6%).

Most common industries for males (%):

- Public administration (20%)
- Construction (11%)
- Paper (9%)
- Agriculture, forestry, fishing and hunting (7%)
- Educational services (5%)
- Food and beverage stores (4%)
- Truck transportation (4%)

Most common industries for females (%):

- Educational services (17%)
- Health care (17%)
- Public administration (12%)
- Food and beverage stores (10%)
- Accommodation and food services (8%)
- Department and other general merchandise stores (5%)
- Social assistance (5%)

Most common occupations for males: (%)

- Law enforcement workers including supervisors (9%)
- Vehicle and mobile equipment mechanics, installers, and repairers (9%)
- Other production occupations including supervisors (7%)
- Electrical equipment mechanics and other installation, maintenance, and repair occupations including supervisors (6%)
- Agricultural workers including supervisors (6%)
- Driver/sales workers and truck drivers (6%)
- Other management occupations except farmers and farm managers (5%)

Most common occupations for females (%)

- Cashiers (13%)
- Secretaries and administrative assistants (8%)
- Information and record clerks except customer service representatives (8%)
- Health technologists and technicians (7%)
- Other management occupations except farmers and farm managers (7%)
- Waiters and waitresses (4%)
- Child care workers (3%)
