= National Register of Historic Places listings in Lewis County, New York =

Location of Lewis County in New York

List of the National Register of Historic Places listings in Lewis County, New York

This is intended to be a complete list of properties and districts listed on the National Register of Historic Places in Lewis County, New York. The locations of National Register properties and districts (at least for all showing latitude and longitude coordinates below) may be seen in a map by clicking on "Map of all coordinates". One property, the Franklin B. Hough House, is further designated a National Historic Landmark.

This National Park Service list is complete through NPS recent listings posted April 24, 2026.

Contents: Counties in New York
Albany (Albany) – Allegany – Bronx – Broome – Cattaraugus – Cayuga – Chautauqua – Chemung – Chenango – Clinton – Columbia – Cortland – Delaware – Dutchess (Poughkeepsie, Rhinebeck) – Erie (Buffalo) – Essex – Franklin – Fulton – Genesee – Greene – Hamilton – Herkimer – Jefferson – Kings – Lewis – Livingston – Madison – Monroe (Rochester) – Montgomery – Nassau – New York (Below 14th Street, 14th to 59th Streets, 59th to 110th Streets, Above 110th Street, Islands) – Niagara (Niagara Falls) – Oneida – Onondaga (Syracuse) – Ontario – Orange – Orleans – Oswego – Otsego – Putnam – Queens – Rensselaer – Richmond – Rockland – St. Lawrence – Saratoga – Schenectady – Schoharie – Schuyler – Seneca – Steuben – Suffolk – Sullivan – Tioga – Tompkins – Ulster – Warren – Washington – Wayne – Westchester (Northern, Southern, New Rochelle, Peekskill, Yonkers) – Wyoming – Yates

== Listings county-wide ==
	Name on the Register	Image	Date listed	Location	City or town	Description
1	Alpina Archeological District	Alpina Archeological District	November 2, 1995 (#95000068)	Fort Drum	Diana	Rural iron furnace and associated village site
2	Basselin House		February 8, 2022 (#100007408)	9757 NY 812; 43°53′34″N 75°23′31″W	Croghan	
3	Bateman Hotel	Bateman Hotel	February 18, 1994 (#94000046)	7574 S. State St. 43°47′10″N 75°29′31″W	Lowville	
4	Beaver Falls Grange Hall No. 554		December 1, 2015 (#15000852)	9577 Main St. 43°53′08″N 75°25′52″W	Beaver Falls	1892 building was education and entertainment center in small agricultural community
5	Jonathan C. Collins House and Cemetery	Jonathan C. Collins House and Cemetery	November 9, 1988 (#88002137)	West Rd. 43°34′07″N 75°25′14″W	Constableville	
6	Collinsville Cemetery	Collinsville Cemetery	May 7, 2014 (#14000192)	4061 East Rd. 43°37′35″N 75°23′46″W	West Turin vicinity	
7	Constable Hall	Constable Hall	March 7, 1973 (#73001197)	Off NY 26; 43°33′43″N 75°25′24″W	Constableville	
8	Constableville Village Historic District	Constableville Village Historic District	September 15, 1983 (#83001703)	Roughly bounded by Sugar River, Main, N. Main, W. Main, Church, High, West and James Sts. 43°33′51″N 75°25′50″W	Constableville	
9	Croghan Island Mill	Croghan Island Mill	July 30, 2010 (#10000515)	9897 S. Bridge St. 43°53′52″N 75°23′37″W	Croghan vicinity	
10	First Lewis County Clerk's Office		October 27, 2017 (#100001769)	6660 NY 26; 43°44′12″N 75°28′09″W	Martinsburg	
11	Forest Presbyterian Church		September 24, 2004 (#04001060)	4109 Center St. 43°37′05″N 75°21′41″W	Lyons Falls	
12	Gould Mansion Complex	Gould Mansion Complex	April 19, 1978 (#78001857)	Main St. 43°37′05″N 75°21′38″W	Lyons Falls	
13	Franklin B. Hough House	Franklin B. Hough House	October 15, 1966 (#66000526)	Collins St. 43°47′22″N 75°29′50″W	Lowville	
14	Lewis County Fairgrounds		February 14, 2002 (#02000006)	Bostwick St. 43°47′43″N 75°29′25″W	Lowville	
15	Lewis County Soldiers' and Sailors' Monument	Lewis County Soldiers' and Sailors' Monument	July 29, 2009 (#09000575)	Village Green, NY 26 and Bostwick Sts. 43°47′27″N 75°29′44″W	Lowville	
16	Harry and Molly Lewis House	Harry and Molly Lewis House	November 21, 2012 (#12000956)	9520 E. Main St. 43°53′06″N 75°25′39″W	Beaver Falls vicinity	
17	Lewisburg Archeological District	Lewisburg Archeological District	November 2, 1995 (#95000071)	Fort Drum	Diana	Rural iron furnace and associated village site
18	Leyden Common School No. 2		June 21, 2016 (#16000392)	6606 School Rd. 43°32′02″N 75°22′02″W	Talcottville	1870 one-room schoolhouse in use for almost a century afterward
19	Lowville & Beaver River Railroad Historic District		November 18, 2024 (#100010982)	Railway corridor from Lowville to Croghan, New York; 43°47′46″N 75°29′17″W	Lowville	
20	Lowville Masonic Temple	Lowville Masonic Temple	September 19, 2008 (#08000919)	7552 S. State St. 43°47′10″N 75°29′28″W	Lowville	
21	Lowville Presbyterian Church	Lowville Presbyterian Church	June 27, 2007 (#07000623)	7707 North State St. 43°47′28″N 75°29′47″W	Lowville	
22	Gen. Walter Martin House		July 24, 2008 (#08000698)	6575 Main St. 43°44′16″N 75°28′09″W	Martinsburg	
23	Martinsburg Common School District #4		November 10, 2022 (#100008340)	6503 Ramos Rd. 43°45′54″N 75°27′42″W	Martinsburg	
24	Martinsburg Town Hall	Martinsburg Town Hall	March 21, 2001 (#01000241)	NY 26 Main St., E 43°44′14″N 75°28′08″W	Martinsburg	
25	Methodist Episcopal Church of West Martinsburg	Methodist Episcopal Church of West Martinsburg	September 15, 1983 (#83001704)	W. Martinsburg Rd. 43°45′35″N 75°31′00″W	West Martinsburg	
26	Moser Farm		July 30, 2010 (#10000516)	8778 Erie Canal Rd. 43°53′32″N 75°20′06″W	Kirschnerville vicinity	
27	Old Lowville Cemetery		August 22, 2016 (#16000553)	5515 Jackson and 5575 River Sts. 43°47′00″N 75°29′12″W	Lowville	One of the oldest cemeteries in the county holds the graves of many early Lowville settlers and war veterans
28	Osceola Town Hall	Osceola Town Hall	December 22, 2005 (#05001454)	N. Ocseola Rd. 43°30′11″N 75°43′21″W	Osceola	
29	Pinckney Corners Cemetery		September 10, 2014 (#14000578)	Pinckney Rd. 43°52′03″N 75°43′29″W	Copenhagen vicinity.	Graves in town's oldest cemetery date back to 1810; those buried include veterans of Revolutionary War and War of 1812
30	Pine Grove Community Church	Pine Grove Community Church	August 20, 2009 (#09000633)	Austin Rd. & Pine Grove Rd. 43°45′07″N 75°22′39″W	Pine Grove	
31	The Pines		June 27, 2007 (#07000621)	3998-4000 Lyons Falls Rd. 43°37′23″N 75°21′32″W	Lyons Falls	
32	St. Mark's Church		August 6, 1998 (#98001003)	Jct. of West Main and Elm Sts. 43°34′52″N 75°20′59″W	Port Leyden	
33	Stoddard–O'Connor House		June 23, 2011 (#11000402)	5431 Shady Ave. 43°47′14″N 75°29′20″W	Lowville	
34	Talcottville Cemetery		December 8, 2017 (#100001885)	2052 NY 12-D; 43°31′51″N 75°21′51″W	Talcottville	
35	Wildwood Cemetery and Mary Lyon Fisher Memorial Chapel		June 27, 2011 (#11000403)	River Rd. 43°36′30″N 75°20′43″W	Lyons Falls	
36	Edmund Wilson House	Edmund Wilson House	November 26, 1973 (#73001198)	Rte. 12d, Talcottville, NY; 43°32′05″N 75°21′59″W	Talcottville	

== See also ==
- National Register of Historic Places listings in New York
