= List of hamlets in Lewis County, New York =

This is a list of the hamlets in Lewis County, New York.

Name	Former name(s)	Location	Elevation	GNIS Feature ID
Alpina		44.169230°N 75.426592°W	745 feet (227 m)	972162
Barnes Corners		43.817012°N 75.817695°W	1,411 feet (430 m)	943043
Beaver Falls	Beaverfalls, Castorville, Rohr's Mills	43.887013°N 75.427408°W	807 feet (246 m)	943383
Belfort	Monterey	43.928124°N 75.332132°W	984 feet (300 m)	972214
Bellwood		43.802847°N 75.681579°W	1,614 feet (492 m)	972220
Brantingham		43.688680°N 75.292122°W	1,253 feet (382 m)	944651
Briggs Corner		43.874514°N 75.535743°W	810 feet (250 m)	972259
Bushes Landing		43.777569°N 75.409072°W	764 feet (233 m)	945315
Clark Corners		43.883679°N 75.660747°W	1,201 feet (366 m)	946753
Collinsville	High Falls Village	43.610347°N 75.384066°W	1,207 feet (368 m)	947163
Crystal Dale	Crystaldale	43.821458°N 75.332961°W	1,086 feet (331 m)	972354
Dadville		43.806736°N 75.474629°W	741 feet (226 m)	947986
Deer River	French's Mills, Myers Mills	43.929791°N 75.589079°W	781 feet (238 m)	948232
Denmark		43.899791°N 75.582412°W	971 feet (296 m)	948303
Diana Center	Blanchards Settlement	44.075622°N 75.440751°W	869 feet (265 m)	972381
East Martinsburg		43.744791°N 75.427404°W	755 feet (230 m)	972423
Fish Creek		43.520348°N 75.533235°W	1,611 feet (491 m)	972472
Forest City		43.952013°N 75.442132°W	919 feet (280 m)	972489
Fowlersville		43.623958°N 75.274064°W	1,168 feet (356 m)	972502
Freeman Mill		43.460903°N 75.578514°W	1,404 feet (428 m)	972510
Glendale		43.716180°N 75.41657°W	843 feet (257 m)	951201
Glenfield		43.710347°N 75.402125°W	768 feet (234 m)	951212
Goulds Mill		43.609236°N 75.340454°W	863 feet (263 m)	951421
Greig		43.681458°N 75.354623°W	807 feet (246 m)	951800
Harrisburg	Harrisburgh	43.842291°N 75.602689°W	1,362 feet (415 m)	972601
Harrisville				
High Falls		43.923124°N 75.372131°W	935 feet (285 m)	972616
Hooker		43.69257°N 75.743801°W	1,765 feet (538 m)	972623
Houseville		43.681458°N 75.444625°W	1,312 feet (400 m)	972628
Indian River		43.976457°N 75.3688°W	961 feet (293 m)	972650
Jerden Falls		44.012845°N 75.322135°W	922 feet (281 m)	972662
Kimball Mill		44.085621°N 75.347974°W	886 feet (270 m)	972688
Kirschnerville		43.883124°N 75.336852°W	928 feet (283 m)	954719
Kosterville		43.615902°N 75.334621°W	938 feet (286 m)	972695
Lake Bonaparte		44.138120°N 75.379367°W	768 feet (234 m)	954896
Leisher Mill		43.485348°N 75.638239°W	1,368 feet (417 m)	972717
Locust Grove		43.563403°N 75.374342°W	1,355 feet (413 m)	970313
Lyonsdale		43.618680°N 75.306287°W	1,066 feet (325 m)	956209
Martinsburg	Martinsburgh	43.737569°N 75.469627°W	1,263 feet (385 m)	956600
Michigan Mills		43.603681°N 75.597406°W	1,775 feet (541 m)	972796
Mohawk Hill		43.524792°N 75.469622°W	1,778 feet (542 m)	972808
Monteola		43.645903°N 75.662131°W	1,837 feet (560 m)	972810
Naumburg	Naumberg, Naumburgh, Prussian Settlement	43.901180°N 75.494075°W	741 feet (226 m)	958301
New Boston		43.800069°N 75.745748°W	1,529 feet (466 m)	958392
New Bremen	Dayansville	43.837847°N 75.440185°W	771 feet (235 m)	958394
New Campbellwood Wye		43.615348°N 75.717132°W	1,795 feet (547 m)	972833
North Croghan Crossing		44.034791°N 75.496859°W	906 feet (276 m)	972861
North Osceola		43.570903°N 75.712409°W	1,591 feet (485 m)	972871
Number Four		43.865623°N 75.180739°W	1,568 feet (478 m)	959057
Old Campbellwood Wye	Old Campbellwood Y	43.617014°N 75.664353°W	1,857 feet (566 m)	972891
Osceola		43.500070°N 75.722130°W	1,030 feet (310 m)	959510
Otter Creek		43.718680°N 75.367403°W	787 feet (240 m)	959561
Page		43.655625°N 75.561572°W	1,942 feet (592 m)	972907
Parkers		43.732292°N 75.670744°W	1,837 feet (560 m)	972917
Parson Mill		43.449514°N 75.566569°W	1,437 feet (438 m)	972919
Petries Corners	Petrie's Corners	43.804236°N 75.361572°W	938 feet (286 m)	960255
Pine Grove		43.751736°N 75.376848°W	771 feet (235 m)	972945
Rector		43.755625°N 75.676855°W	1,808 feet (551 m)	972988
Remington Corners		44.123398°N 75.362144°W	797 feet (243 m)	962373
Shuetown		43.620347°N 75.328509°W	968 feet (295 m)	973066
Soft Maple		43.922012°N 75.241298°W	1,181 feet (360 m)	973083
Sperryville		43.773125°N 75.306570°W	1,234 feet (376 m)	973105
Swancott Mill		43.462292°N 75.602959°W	1,316 feet (401 m)	973130
Talcottville	Leyden	43.533402°N 75.365174°W	1,135 feet (346 m)	967005
Texas		43.985069°N 75.504911°W	909 feet (277 m)	973148
Watson		43.775903°N 75.436016°W	748 feet (228 m)	968923
Welch Hill		43.636181°N 75.460458°W	1,923 feet (586 m)	973215
West Leyden		43.459514°N 75.463788°W	1,489 feet (454 m)	970784
West Lowville		43.793403°N 75.547686°W	1,214 feet (370 m)	970786
West Martinsburg	West Martinsburgh	43.759514°N 75.517406°W	1,260 feet (380 m)	970789
Wetmore		43.697847°N 75.559073°W	1,991 feet (607 m)	973257
Windecker		43.799236°N 75.612410°W	1,680 feet (510 m)	973276
