= Osceola, New York =

- Town
- Location within New York Location within the United States
- Coordinates: 43°32′7″N 75°42′0″W
- Country: United States
- State: New York
- County: Lewis

Area
  - Total: 87.10 sq mi (225.58 km^{2})
  - Land: 87.01 sq mi (225.35 km^{2})
  - Water: 0.089 sq mi (0.23 km^{2})
- Elevation: 1,686 ft (514 m)

Population (2010)
  - Total: 229
  - Estimate (2016): 228
  - Density: 2.6/sq mi (1.01/km^{2})
- Time zone: UTC-5 (Eastern (EST))
  - Summer (DST): UTC-4 (EDT)
- ZIP Codes: 13316 (Camden); 13325 (Constableville); 13367 (Lowville); 13437 (Redfield)
- FIPS code: 36-049-55497
- GNIS feature ID: 979321

Osceola is a town in Lewis County, New York, United States. The population was 229 at the 2010 census. The town is named for the Seminole fighter Osceola.

The town of Osceola is in the southwestern part of Lewis County and is southwest of Lowville, the county seat.

== History ==
Settlement in the town began around 1838. Osceola was formed from the town of West Turin in 1844. The town's name was selected by Anna Maria Jay, the granddaughter of John Jay, following national outrage over the capture and treatment of Osceola.

The Osceola Town Hall was added to the National Register of Historic Places in 2005.

== Geography ==
According to the United States Census Bureau, the town has a total area of 87.1 square miles (226 km^{2}), of which 0.1 square miles (0.26 km^{2}), or 0.10%, are water.

The southern town line is the border of Oneida County, and the western town line is the border of Oswego County.

The Salmon River, a tributary of Lake Ontario, flows across the southern part of the town.

== Demographics ==
Historical population
Census	Pop.	Note	%±
1850	412		—
1860	595		44.4%
1870	688		15.6%
1880	666		−3.2%
1890	587		−11.9%
1900	629		7.2%
1910	456		−27.5%
1920	431		−5.5%
1930	319		−26.0%
1940	281		−11.9%
1950	244		−13.2%
1960	181		−25.8%
1970	167		−7.7%
1980	321		92.2%
1990	239		−25.5%
2000	265		10.9%
2010	229		−13.6%
2016 (est.)	228		−0.4%
U.S. Decennial Census

At the 2000 census, there were 265 people, 112 households and 74 families residing in the town. The population density was 3.0 inhabitants per square mile (1.2/km^{2}). There were 402 housing units at an average density of 4.6 per square mile (1.8/km^{2}). The racial makeup of the town was 99.62% White, 0.38% from other races. Hispanic or Latino of any race were 0.38% of the population.

There were 112 households, of which 28.6% had children under the age of 18 living with them, 50.0% were married couples living together, 10.7% had a female householder with no husband present, and 33.9% were non-families. 28.6% of all households were made up of individuals, and 10.7% had someone living alone who was 65 years of age or older. The average household size was 2.37 and the average family size was 2.88.

24.2% of the population were under the age of 18, 4.2% from 18 to 24, 33.2% from 25 to 44, 24.9% from 45 to 64, and 13.6% who were 65 years of age or older. The median age was 41 years. For every 100 females, there were 94.9 males. For every 100 females age 18 and over, there were 101.0 males.

The median household income was $35,469, and the median family income was $38,750. Males had a median income of $31,125 versus $20,750 for females. The per capita income for the town was $17,467. About 13.7% of families and 12.2% of the population were below the poverty line, including 15.9% of those under the age of eighteen and 15.2% of those 65 or over.

== Communities and locations in Osceola ==
- Monteola – A hamlet in the northeastern part of the town. (This hamlet is now abandoned, there is no permanent population and no public road to access it. The only access is by the abandoned G & W railroad bed.)
- New Campbellwood Wye – A hamlet in the northwestern part of the town. (New Campbellwood Wye is now abandoned and is only accessible via logging trails.)
- North Osceola – A hamlet in the west-central part of the town.
- Old Campbellwood Wye – A hamlet south of Monteola. (Old Campbell Wood Wye is abandoned and there are no public roads to access the location.)
- Osceola – The hamlet of Osceola is in the southern part of the town on County Road 46.
