= Macomb's Purchase =

Coordinates: 44.445°N 75.567°W

Macomb's Purchase was a nearly four-million-acre (1,600,000 ha) tract of northern New York State purchased from the state in 1791 by Alexander Macomb, a merchant turned land speculator who had become wealthy during the American Revolutionary War.

== History ==
In 1792, a decade after the end of the American Revolutionary War, the state of New York was struggling financially. It opened for sale nearly five million acres of land which state officials, under pressure from land speculators and other business interests, had forced the Iroquois tribes, allies of the British during the rebellion, to cede. Alexander Macomb, William Constable, and Daniel McCormick agreed to purchase nearly 4,000,000 acres (1,600,000 ha) from the state at the extremely low price of 8 pence (New York state money) per acre. This was an enormous amount of land, about one-eighth of the entire state of New York, and included a large amount of land of the Oneida people, who'd sided with the rebels during the Revolution. Convinced something illegal must have occurred, the New York State Legislature held exhaustive hearings into the land purchase, but no wrongdoing was uncovered.

Macomb, however, was unable to sell his land to settlers and developers fast enough to fund his massive purchase. He went bankrupt and was sentenced to debtor's prison six months after the purchase was made. Macomb sold 2,000,000 acres (810,000 ha) to Constable for 50,000 pounds (New York money), who six months later sold 1,000,000 acres (400,000 ha) to banker Samuel Ward for 100,000 pounds. Ward, in turn, sold 210,000 acres (85,000 ha) to James Greenleaf, the son of a wealthy Boston merchant. Greenleaf had purchased a cargo of tea from Rhode Island merchant John Brown (whose family funded and lent its name to Brown University). Greenleaf paid for the cargo partly in cash, and partly with the land he owned in New York. This 210,000-acre (85,000 ha) became known as Brown's Tract.

Constable further subdivided his land into numerous plots. He found buyers worldwide: the High Sheriff of London, England, purchased 26,000 acres (11,000 ha) for a shilling an acre.

== Description ==
Macomb's Purchase was 3,670,715 acres (5,735.492 sq mi) (1,485,486 ha) in size, or nearly 1,000 square miles larger than the land area of the current state of Connecticut and 50% larger than the states of Delaware and Rhode Island combined. The tract included much of northern New York along the St. Lawrence River and eastern Lake Ontario (including the Thousand Islands). The purchase was eventually divided into 10 large townships. From this purchase are derived the deeds for all the lands that are now included in Lewis, Jefferson, and St. Lawrence counties, as well as portions of Franklin, Herkimer, and Oswego counties.

== Bibliography ==
- Barlow, Jane A. Big Moose Lake in the Adirondacks: The Story of the Lake, the Land, and the People. Syracuse, N.Y.: Syracuse University Press, 2004.
- Schneider, Paul. The Adirondacks: A History of America's First Wilderness. New York: Henry Holt and Co., 1997.

== See also ==
- Castorland Company
