= Leyden, New York =

- Town
- Location within New York Location within the United States
- Coordinates: 43°32′49″N 75°21′37″W
- Country: United States
- State: New York
- County: Lewis

Area
  - Total: 33.55 sq mi (86.90 km^{2})
  - Land: 33.33 sq mi (86.33 km^{2})
  - Water: 0.22 sq mi (0.58 km^{2})
- Elevation: 1,138 ft (347 m)

Population (2010)
  - Total: 1,785
  - Estimate (2016): 1,772
  - Density: 53.2/sq mi (20.53/km^{2})
- Time zone: UTC-5 (Eastern (EST))
  - Summer (DST): UTC-4 (EDT)
- ZIP Codes: 13433 (Port Leyden); 13309 (Boonville); 13325 (Constableville)
- Area code: 315
- FIPS code: 36-049-42213
- GNIS feature ID: 979148
- Website: https://townofleydenny.gov/

Leyden is a town in Lewis County, New York, United States. The population was 1,785 at the 2010 census. The town is in the southern part of the county and is north of Rome.

== History ==
Settlement began around 1794.

Leyden was formed from the town of Steuben (in Oneida County) in 1797. Leyden formed part of a tract called the "Inman Triangle".

The town of Leyden gave up much of its territory to form new towns such as Watson (1821) and Lewis (1852). Leyden was also partitioned to form the towns of Brownville (Jefferson County in 1802) and Boonville (Oneida County in 1805), and part of the town of Wilna (Jefferson County in 1813). Port Leyden in the town was a port on the former Black River Canal.

The town is named after the Dutch city Leiden.

== Geography ==
According to the United States Census Bureau, Leyden has a total area of 33.5 square miles (87 km^{2}), of which 33.3 square miles (86 km^{2}) are land and 0.2 square miles (0.52 km^{2}), or 0.66%, are water.

The Black River marks the eastern town line, and the southern town boundary is the border of Oneida County.

New York State Route 12 and New York State Route 12D are principal north-south highways in the town. NY-12 runs closer to the Black River.

== Demographics ==
Historical population
Census	Pop.	Note	%±
1820	1,203		—
1830	1,502		24.9%
1840	2,438		62.3%
1850	2,253		−7.6%
1860	1,859		−17.5%
1870	2,048		10.2%
1880	1,933		−5.6%
1890	1,624		−16.0%
1900	1,629		0.3%
1910	1,613		−1.0%
1920	1,515		−6.1%
1930	1,482		−2.2%
1940	1,519		2.5%
1950	1,622		6.8%
1960	1,715		5.7%
1970	1,677		−2.2%
1980	1,660		−1.0%
1990	1,796		8.2%
2000	1,792		−0.2%
2010	1,785		−0.4%
2016 (est.)	1,772		−0.7%
U.S. Decennial Census

As of the census of 2000, there were 1,792 people, 676 households, and 488 families residing in the town. The population density was 53.8 inhabitants per square mile (20.8/km^{2}). There were 807 housing units at an average density of 24.2 per square mile (9.3/km^{2}). The racial makeup of the town was 99.05% White, 0.22% African American, 0.11% Native American, 0.17% from other races, and 0.45% from two or more races. Hispanic or Latino of any race were 0.17% of the population.

There were 676 households, out of which 37.0% had children under the age of 18 living with them, 55.0% were married couples living together, 12.3% had a female householder with no husband present, and 27.8% were non-families. 23.7% of all households were made up of individuals, and 9.9% had someone living alone who was 65 years of age or older. The average household size was 2.61 and the average family size was 3.07.

In the town, the population was spread out, with 28.9% under the age of 18, 7.5% from 18 to 24, 30.1% from 25 to 44, 21.4% from 45 to 64, and 12.2% who were 65 years of age or older. The median age was 35 years. For every 100 females, there were 98.2 males. For every 100 females age 18 and over, there were 96.2 males.

The median income for a household in the town was $29,489, and the median income for a family was $33,512. Males had a median income of $27,424 versus $20,250 for females. The per capita income for the town was $14,252. About 13.9% of families and 19.0% of the population were below the poverty line, including 23.5% of those under age 18 and 17.5% of those age 65 or over.

== Communities and locations in Leyden ==
- Leyden Hill – A former community in the northern part of Leyden.
- Locust Grove – A hamlet southwest of Port Leyden and on NY-12D.
- The Narrows – A narrow part of the Black River channel.
- Port Leyden – Most of the village of Port Leyden is at the eastern town line at the Black River and NY-12.
- Talcottville – A hamlet west of Port Leyden and on NY-12D.

== Notable people ==
- Florence Augusta Merriam Bailey, ornithologist; born in Locust Grove in 1863
- Wallace B. Douglas, Minnesota jurist, lawyer, and politician; born in Leyden
