= Franklin B. Hough =

American Civil War surgeon and civil servant

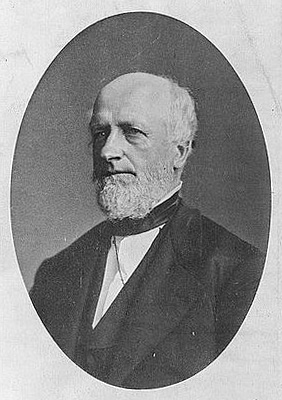
Franklin B. Hough

Franklin Benjamin Hough (/ˈhʌf/; July 20, 1822 – June 11, 1885) was an American scientist, historian and the first chief of the United States Division of Forestry, the predecessor of the United States Forest Service. He was among the first to call attention to the depletion of forests in the U.S. and is sometimes called the "father of American forestry".

== Biography ==
Hough was born in Martinsburg, New York on July 20, 1822 to Dr. Horatio Gates Hough and Martha Pitcher Hough. Martha was a descendant of Andrew Pitcher and Margaret Russell, early settlers of Milton, MA in 1634. Horatio, a physician from Meriden, Connecticut, was the first medical doctor to settle in Lewis County, in the west of the Adirondack Mountains. Horatio Hough died in 1830 when Benjamin was eight years old, at which point he began to go by his middle name, Franklin; he was also a scientist and author.

As a young man, Franklin showed an interest in mineralogy and long hikes. He graduated with a degree from Union College in Schenectady in 1843, and in 1846 he was married to Maria Eggleston of Champion, New York, and a daughter was born, Lola. He also published the first of his major scientific writings, A Catalogue of Indigenous, Naturalized, and Filicord Plants of Lewis Counties, New York. In 1848, he received an M.D. from Western Reserve College. The same year, Maria died. In 1857, he had a son, Romeyn Beck Hough, who would also go on to pursue a career in botany and medicine. He was elected as a member to the American Philosophical Society in 1882.

=== Medical career ===
Hough devoted his spare time to natural history. During this period, he discovered a mineral that would bear his name, Houghite, a local variety of hydrotalcite. In 1849, he married Mariah Kilham, who, in 1850, bore him a second daughter, Mary Ellen. Seven additional children were born to the couple between 1854 and 1872. In 1852, Hough stepped down from the practice of medicine to concentrate on research and literary pursuits. He lived in Brownville and Albany and published A History of St. Lawrence and Franklin Counties, New York (1853) and A History of Jefferson County in the State of New York (1854). He wrote prolifically, keeping three or more different manuscripts in progress at the same time in different rooms of his house. Explaining his work habits, he said, "I seek repose in labor."

In 1854, Hough was appointed as superintendent of the 1855 New York State census, the first complete census of the state. Drawing on that experience, he served as "Foreman of the Statistical Department" for John Homer French's Gazetteer of the State of New York, published 1860. (He eventually published his own, updated Gazetteer in 1872.) He returned to Lewis County in 1860 to settle in Lowville, New York. The same year, he published A history of Lewis County, in the state of New York. In 1862, he started a periodical, The American Journal of Forestry. Due to a lack of subscribers, he retired it after only a year.

In 1861, with the advent of the American Civil War, Hough worked as an inspector for the United States Sanitary Commission. In 1862, he enlisted as a surgeon in the 97th New York Volunteer Infantry. The same year, he translated French military surgeon Lucien Baudens' account of medical conditions during the Crimean War, publishing it as On Military and Camp Hospitals. He published an account of his war experiences in History of Duryee's Brigade (1864). Brigadier General Abram Duryée had commanded the 97th, 104th and 105th New York Infantry Regiments and the 107th Pennsylvania Infantry.

=== Father of American forestry ===
Ten years after supervising the 1855 New York State census, Hough returned to the job of overseeing the 1865 state census. Reviewing the returns, he noted with alarm a declining trend in the availability of timber. Finding additional evidence in the federal census of 1870, which he also supervised, he presented a paper entitled On the Duty of Governments in the Preservation of Forests to the 1873 meeting of the American Association for the Advancement of Science in Portland, Maine.

Hough argued that Mediterranean countries had harmed the environment by excessive harvests of trees, and that a similar problem faced the United States. He proposed regulation of the use of forests and the establishment of forestry schools. As a result of Hough's presentation, the Association formed a committee to educate Congress and state legislatures on the dangers of deforestation, and to recommend legislation to avoid it. Hough was appointed to chair the committee. In 1876, as a result of the Association's lobbying, Congress created the office of Special Agent in the U.S. Department of Agriculture to assess the state of the forests and lumber in the United States. USDA Commissioner Frederick Watts appointed Hough to fill the new position.

Hough traveled widely to compile his official 1877 Report on Forestry. Congress ordered the publication of 25,000 copies of the 650-page volume. In 1881, the Division of Forestry was created within the Department of Agriculture, with Hough as its first chief. In 1883, Secretary of Agriculture George B. Loring replaced Hough, whom he disliked, with Nathaniel Egleston. Hough resumed his previous role as special agent.

Hough died in Lowville on June 11, 1885, aged 62. His home, the Franklin B. Hough House, was declared a National Historic Landmark in 1963.

== Major works ==
- A Catalogue of Indigenous, Naturalized, and Filicord Plants of Lewis Counties, New York (1846)
- A History of St. Lawrence and Franklin Counties, New York (1853)
- A History of Jefferson County in the State of New York from the Earliest Period to the Present Time (1854)
- A Narrative of the causes which led to Philip's Indian War of 1675 and 1676. With other documents concerning this event; prepared from the originals with an introduction and notes (1858), see John Easton, of Rhode Island
- A History of Lewis County in the State of New York from the Beginning of its Settlement to the Present Time (1860)
- On Military and Camp Hospitals (translation, 1862)
- History of Duryee's Brigade (1864)
- Washingtoniana: Or, Memorials of the Death of George Washington (1865)
- Gazetteer of the State of New York: embracing a comprehensive account of the history and statistics of the state, with geological and topographical descriptions, and recent statistical tables... (1872)
- American Biographical Notes (1875)
- Elements of Forestry (1882)

== See also ==
- United States Chief Foresters
