= Daniel McCormick =

Daniel McCormick may refer to:

- Daniel McCormick (banker) (died 1834), Scottish-born businessman; founding director of the Bank of New York
- Daniel McCormick (judoka) (born 1986), American Olympic judoka
- Danny McCormick, American politician
