= Edmund Wilson House =

Historic house in New York, United States

- U.S. National Register of Historic Places
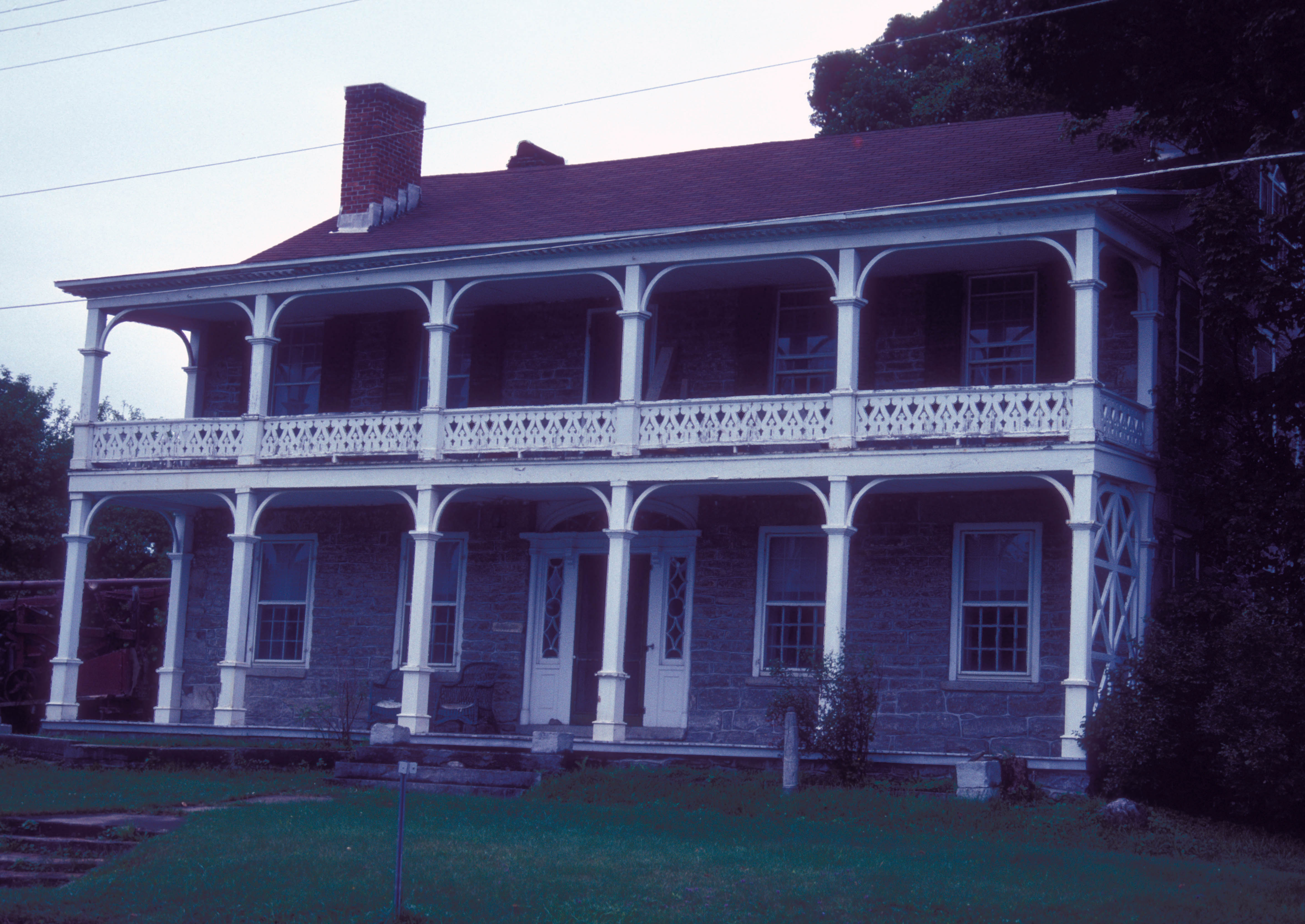

- Location within New York Location within the United States
- Nearest city: Port Leyden, New York
- Coordinates: 43°32′5″N 75°21′59″W
- Area: 3 acres (1.2 ha)
- Built: 1789
- Architectural style: Georgian
- NRHP reference No.: 73001198
- Added to NRHP: November 26, 1973

Edmund Wilson House is a historic home located at Talcottville in Lewis County, New York. It was built over a four-year period starting in 1789 and is a 2 1/2-story limestone building, three bays wide and four bays long. It was named "The Stone House" by Edmund Wilson, whose family used the house as a summer home and he made it famous in his book Upstate.

It was listed on the National Register of Historic Places in 1973.
