= Egleston =

Egleston may refer to:

== People ==
- William Egleston, Member of Parliament 1553, 1554, and 1586, for Winchelsea
- Nathaniel Egleston (1822–1912), American clergyman and forester
- Olivia Egleston (1784–1859), wife of businessman Anson Greene Phelps, co-founder of the Phelps Dodge Company
- Thomas Egleston (1832–1900), American engineer who helped found Columbia University's School of Mines
- Hawley Egleston, of Michigan, finished 3rd place at the 120-yard high hurdles of the 1933 NCAA Track and Field Championships
- Rita Egleston, nominated for an Outstanding Sound Editing 27th Daytime Emmy Awards for The Phantom Eye
- John Egleston Paterson (1800–?), an American farmer, lawyer and politician from New York

== Places ==
United States

- Egleston Square, at the intersection of Washington Street and Columbus Avenue in the Roxbury neighborhood of Boston, Massachusetts.

== Other uses ==
- List of minor planets: 8001–9000#601
- Egleston (MBTA station), a former rapid transit station in the Greater Boston area.
- Egleston Substation an electrical substation in Boston, Massachusetts.
- Henrietta Egleston Hospital for Children in Atlanta, Georgia.
