= Osceola Town Hall =

- U.S. National Register of Historic Places
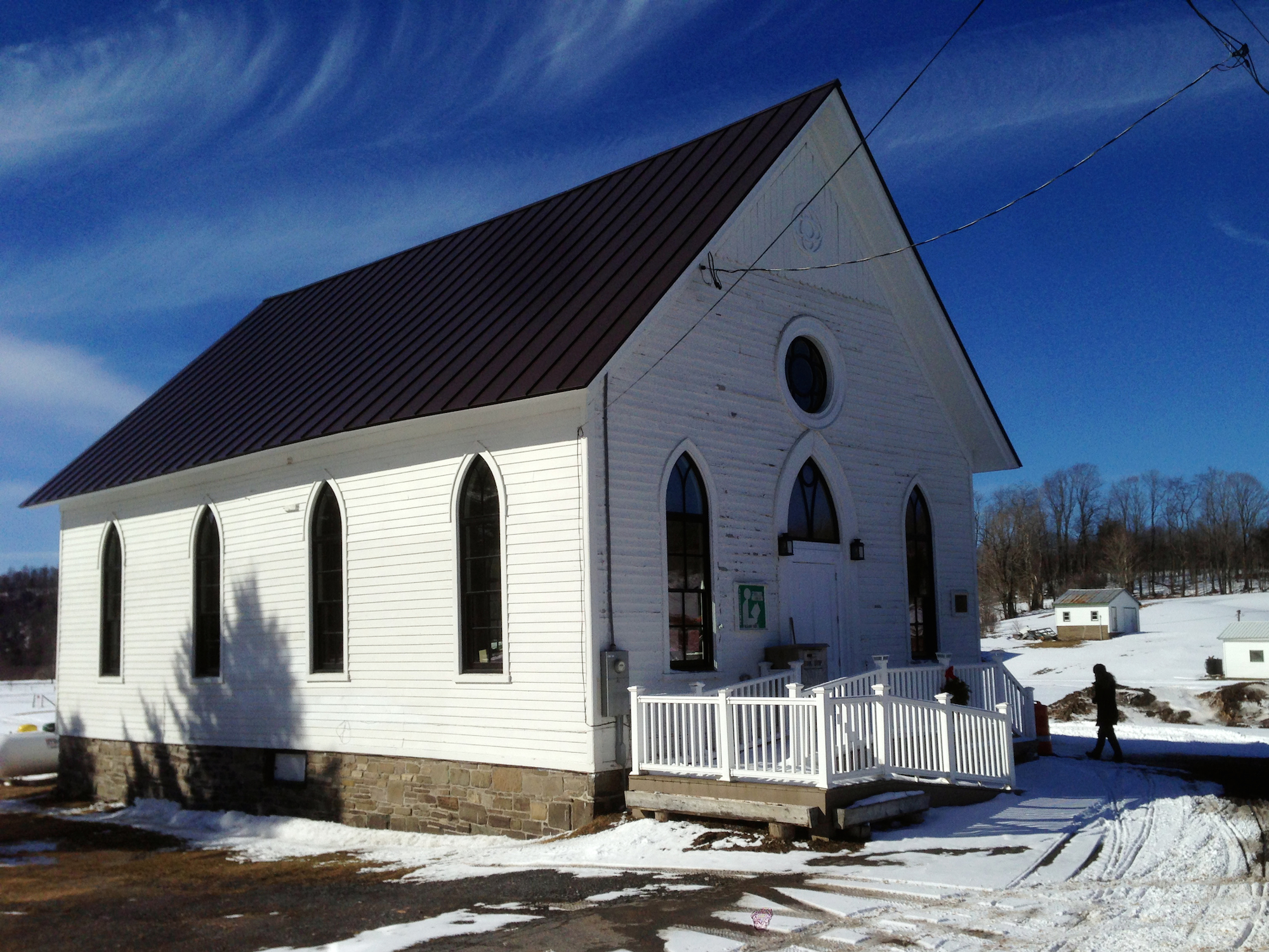
- Osceola Town Hall, March 2017

- Location within New York Location within the United States
- Location: N. Ocseola Rd., Osceola, New York
- Coordinates: 43°30′11″N 75°43′21″W
- Area: less than one acre
- Built: 1882
- Architectural style: Gothic Revival, Carpenter Gothic
- NRHP reference No.: 05001454
- Added to NRHP: December 22, 2005

Osceola Town Hall is a historic town hall located at Osceola in Lewis County, New York. It was built in 1882 as Osceola Methodist Church. It is a one-story, three bay wide, four bay deep Carpenter Gothic building surmounted by a steeply pitched metal clad gable roof with decorative wood trim. In the 1920s, it was converted for use as a town hall and later a library as well.

It was listed on the National Register of Historic Places in 2005.
