= Lewis County Fairgrounds =

- U.S. National Register of Historic Places
- U.S. Historic district
- Location within New York Location within the United States
- Location: Bostwick St., Lowville, New York
- Coordinates: 43°47′43″N 75°29′25″W
- Area: 19.5 acres (7.9 ha)
- Built: 1876
- Architectural style: grandstand
- NRHP reference No.: 02000006
- Added to NRHP: February 14, 2002

Lewis County Fairgrounds is a historic fairground and national historic district located at Lowville in Lewis County, New York. The district includes one contributing building and five contributing structures all constructed about 1876. They are the Grandstand, half-mile Race track, Antiques Building, Taffy Stand, Information Booth, and the balldiamond bleacher stands.

It was listed on the National Register of Historic Places in 2002.
