= Harry and Molly Lewis House =

Historic house in New York, United States

- U.S. National Register of Historic Places
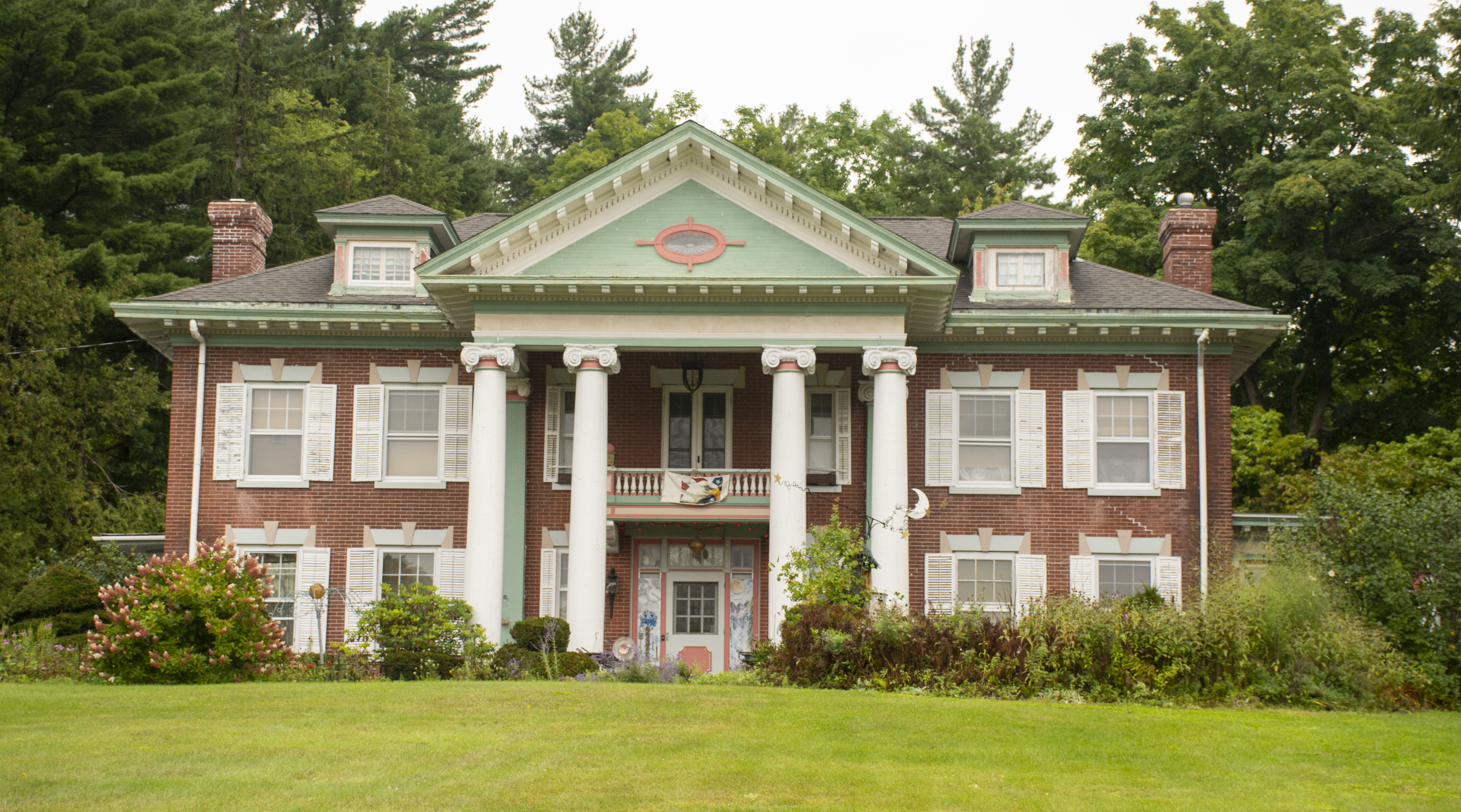

- Location within New York Location within the United States
- Location: 9520 E. Main St., near Beaver Falls, New York
- Coordinates: 43°53′06″N 75°25′39″W
- Area: 3.12 acres (1.26 ha)
- Built: 1909-1910
- Built by: Charles Wisner & Sons
- Architectural style: Colonial Revival
- NRHP reference No.: 12000956
- Added to NRHP: November 21, 2012

Harry and Molly Lewis House, also known as the Fiber Products Research Center, is a historic home located near Beaver Falls in Lewis County, New York. It was built in 1909–1910, and is a 2 1/2-story, five-bay, Colonial Revival style masonry dwelling with a rear ell. It has intersecting hipped roofs and features a monumental two-story projecting portico. Also on the property are the contributing garage (c. 1909–1910), workshop (c. 1909–1910), and water system (c. 1909–1910). The house was converted into the Fiber Products Research Center in 1957 supporting the J.P. Lewis paper company.

It was listed on the National Register of Historic Places in 2011.
