= Franklin B. Hough House =

Historic house in New York, United States

- U.S. National Register of Historic Places
- U.S. National Historic Landmark
- New York State Register of Historic Places
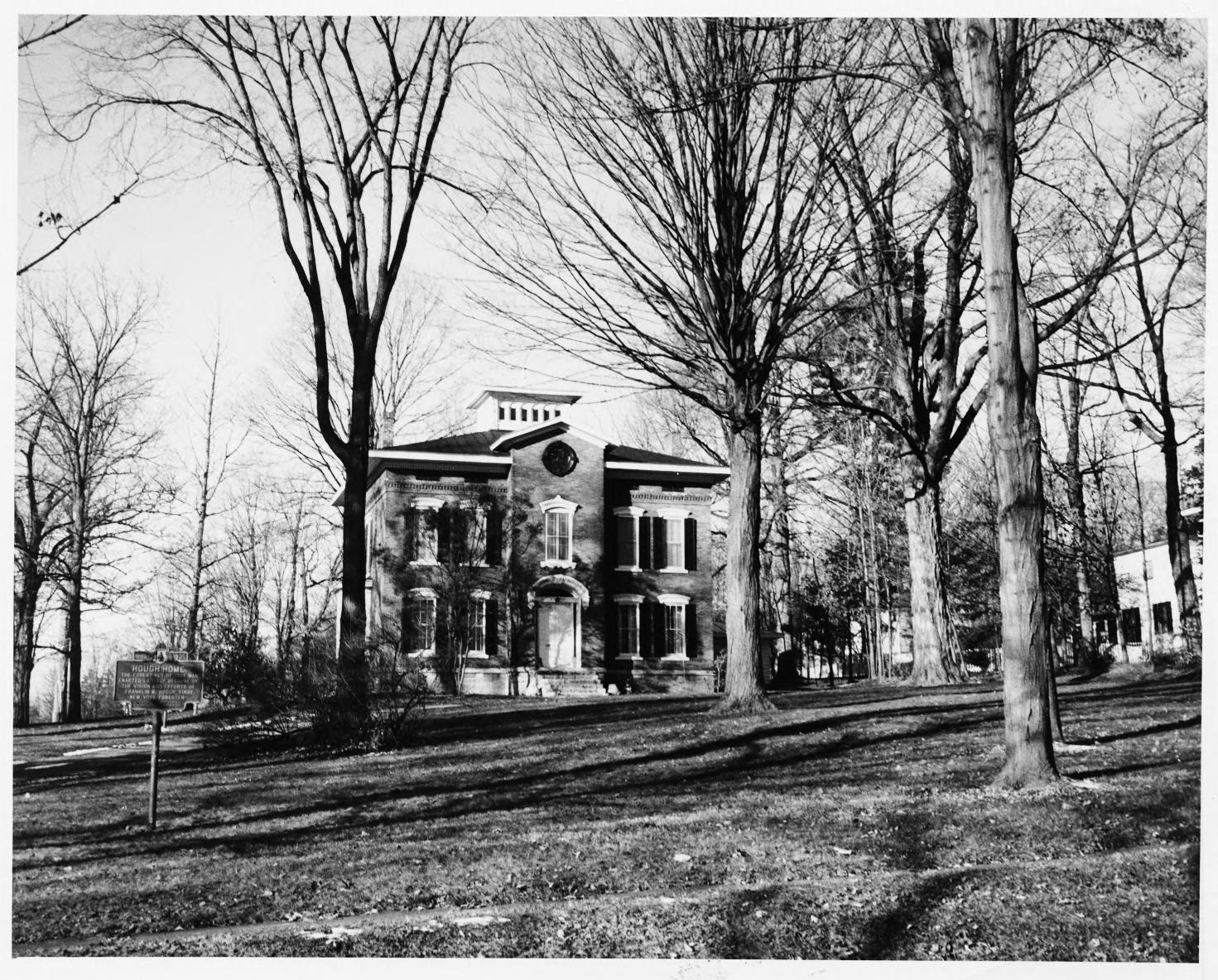
- 1962 photo

- Location within New York Location within the United States
- Location: 7629 Collins Street, Lowville, New York
- Coordinates: 43°47′18″N 75°30′0″W
- Area: 3.5 acres (1.4 ha)
- Built: 1860
- Architectural style: Italian Villa
- NRHP reference No.: 66000526
- NYSRHP No.: 04940.000001

Significant dates
- Added to NRHP: October 15, 1966
- Designated NHL: May 23, 1963
- Designated NYSRHP: June 23, 1980

The Franklin B. Hough House is a historic house at 7629 Collins Street in Lowville, New York. Built 1860–61, it was the home of the "father of American forestry," Franklin Hough (1822-1885), a medical doctor, scientist, historian who served as the first chief of the United States Division of Forestry, the predecessor of the United States Forest Service. It was declared a National Historic Landmark in 1963, and was listed on the National Register of Historic Places in 1966.

== Description and history ==
The Franklin B. Hough House is located in a residential area on the west side of Lowville, on the west side of Collins Street, on a parcel marked by a commemorative plaque. It is set well back from the street, and is approached by a semi-circular drive. It is 2 1/2 stories in height, built out of brick and covered by a truncated hip roof. At the center of the main roof is a rectangular belvedere, also capped by a hip roof with dentillated cornice. The main facade is five bays wide with a projecting central bay that rises to a gabled peak above the main roof line. Most windows are set in openings topped by heavy segmented-arch hood mouldings.

The house was completed in 1861, and was from 1863 to 1865 home to Franklin Hough. Hough was one of the first people in the nation to articulate significant concern for the state of its forests, observing that forestry products had declined in New York in the 1850s and 1860s. In 1876, he was appointed the first federal government official responsible for overseeing the nation's forests. The organization he established eventually became the United States Forest Service.

Hough's house remained in the family until 1967.

== See also ==
- List of National Historic Landmarks in New York
- National Register of Historic Places listings in Lewis County, New York
