= Constableville Village Historic District =

Historic district in New York, United States

- U.S. National Register of Historic Places
- U.S. Historic district
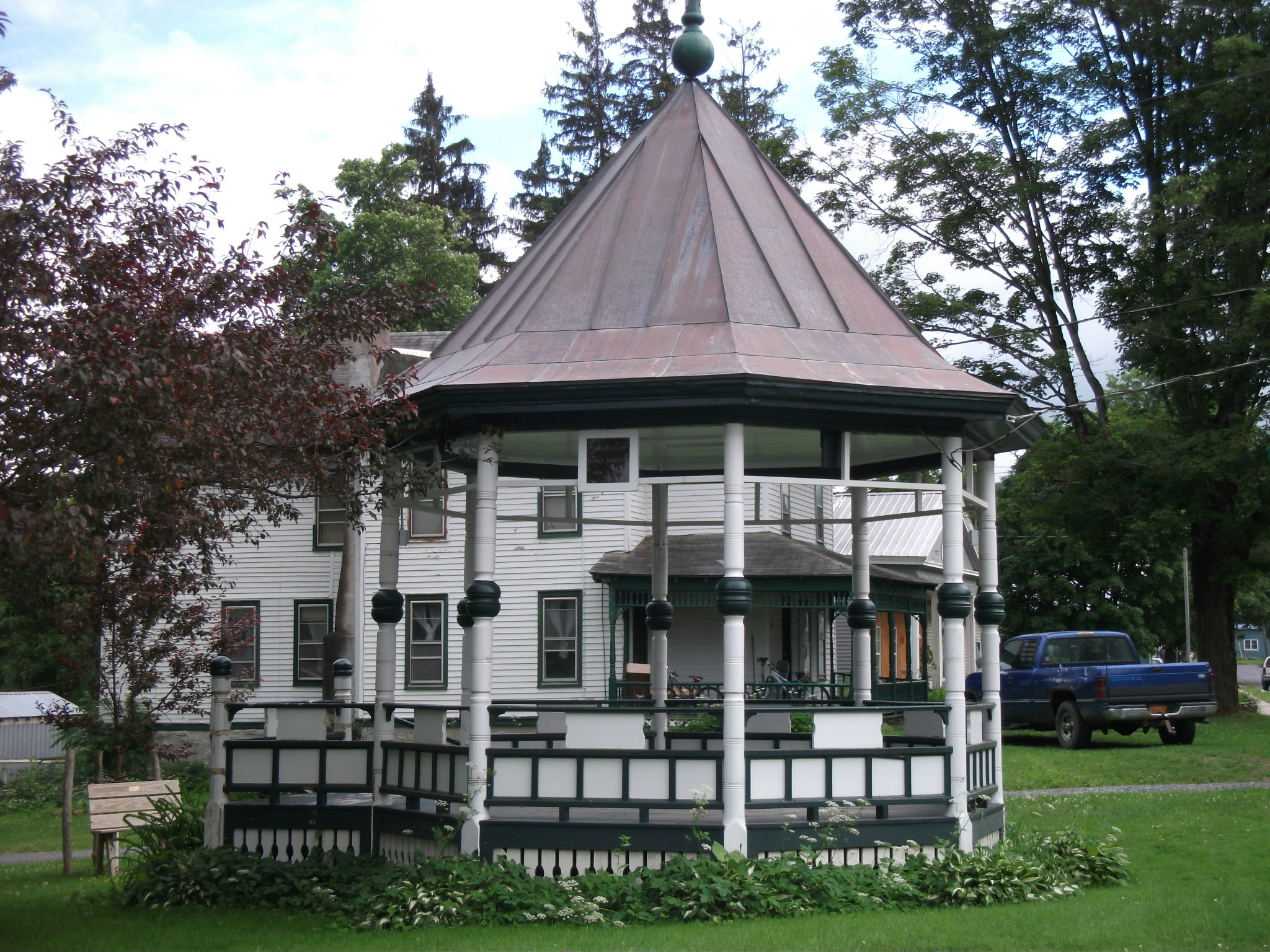
- Constableville Village Historic District, June 2011

- Location within New York
- Location: Roughly bounded by Sugar River, Main, N. Main, W. Main, Church, High, West and James Sts., Constableville, New York
- Coordinates: 43°33′51″N 75°25′50″W
- Area: 59.4 acres (24.0 ha)
- Built: 1828
- Architect: Multiple
- Architectural style: Late Victorian
- NRHP reference No.: 83001703
- Added to NRHP: September 15, 1983

Constableville Village Historic District is a national historic district located at Constableville in Lewis County, New York. The district includes 105 contributing buildings, one contributing structure, and one contributing site. The buildings are commercial, residential, civic, and church structures built primarily between about 1828 and 1900. Also included are a rural cemetery dating from the late 19th century, one historic bridge, and an early 20th-century school.

It was listed on the National Register of Historic Places in 1983.
