= Jonathan C. Collins House and Cemetery =

Historic house in New York, United States

- U.S. National Register of Historic Places
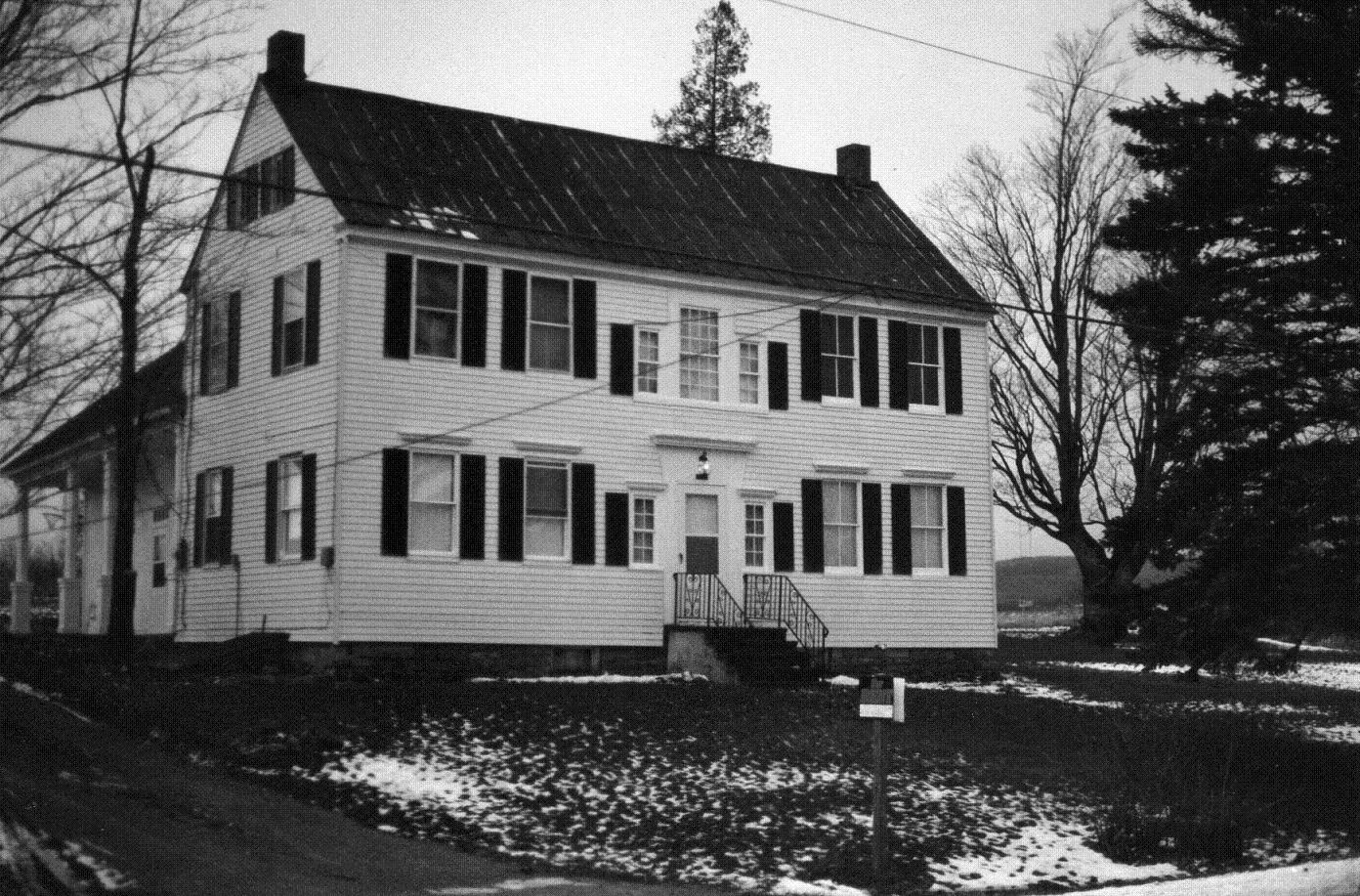

- Location within New York Location within the United States
- Location: West Rd., Constableville, New York
- Coordinates: 43°34′7″N 75°25′14″W
- Area: 1.5 acres (0.61 ha)
- Built: 1797–1802
- Architect: Collins, Jonathan C.
- Architectural style: Federal
- NRHP reference No.: 88002137
- Added to NRHP: November 9, 1988

Jonathan C. Collins House and Cemetery is a historic home located at Constableville in Lewis County, New York. It was built between 1797 and 1802 and is a 2 1/2-story, five bays wide and two bays long, center entry frame dwelling with a large rear wing. It rests on a stone foundation and has a gable roof. Located opposite is the Collins family cemetery with the earliest burial dated 1793 and the last in 1943. It contains several fine examples of funerary design executed in local stone.

It was listed on the National Register of Historic Places in 1988.
