= Stoddard–O'Connor House =

Historic house in New York, United States

- U.S. National Register of Historic Places
- Location within New York Location within the United States
- Location: 5431 Shady Ave., Lowville, New York
- Coordinates: 43°47′14″N 75°29′20″W
- Area: Less than 1 acre (0.40 ha)
- Built: 1898
- Architect: Charles Wisner & Sons
- Architectural style: Queen Anne, Colonial Revival
- NRHP reference No.: 11000402
- Added to NRHP: June 23, 2011

Stoddard–O'Connor House is a historic home located at Lowville in Lewis County, New York. It was built in 1898, and is a 2 1/2-story, asymmetrical frame dwelling with Queen Anne and Colonial Revival style design elements. It features a half-height entry porch and projecting stacked bay. Also on the property is a contributing carriage house (c. 1900).

It was listed on the National Register of Historic Places in 2011.
