= St. Mark's Church (Port Leyden, New York) =

Historic church in New York, United States

- U.S. National Register of Historic Places
- Location within New York Location within the United States
- Location: Jct. of West Main and Elm Sts., Port Leyden, New York
- Coordinates: 43°34′52″N 75°20′59″W
- Area: less than one acre
- Built: 1865
- Architectural style: Gothic Revival
- MPS: Historic Churches of the Episcopal Diocese of Central New York MPS
- NRHP reference No.: 98001003
- Added to NRHP: August 6, 1998

St. Mark's Church is a historic Episcopal church located at Port Leyden in Lewis County, New York. It is a frame board and batten sided, three by five bay structure built in 1865 in the Gothic Revival style.

It was listed on the National Register of Historic Places in 1998.
