= Lowville Presbyterian Church =

Historic church in New York, United States

- U.S. National Register of Historic Places
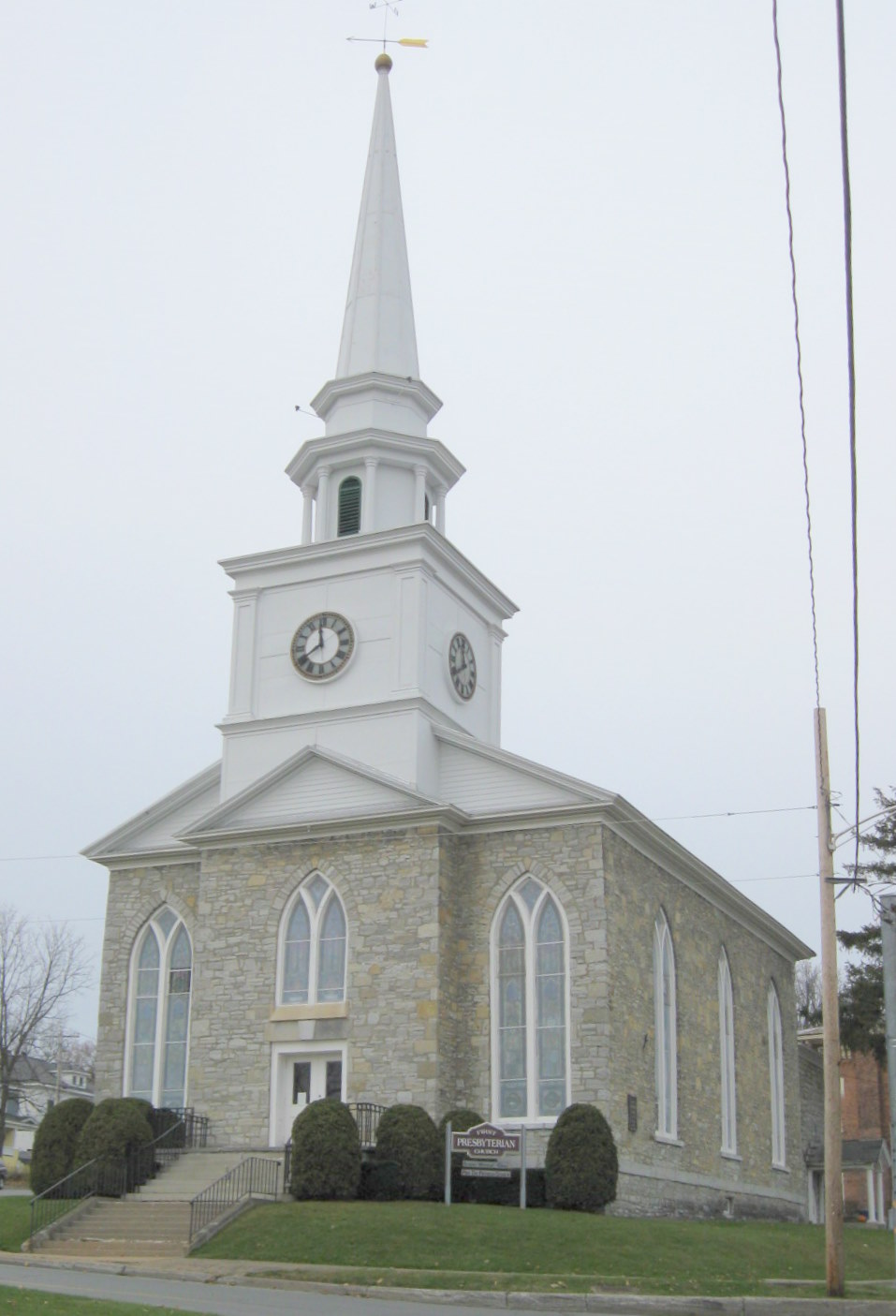
- Lowville Presbyterian Church, November 2009

- Location within New York Location within the United States
- Location: 7707 North State St., Lowville, New York
- Coordinates: 43°47′28″N 75°29′47″W
- Area: less than one acre
- Built: 1831
- Architect: Brainard, Ezra (builder)
- Architectural style: Federal
- NRHP reference No.: 07000623
- Added to NRHP: June 27, 2007

Lowville Presbyterian Church is a historic Presbyterian church located at Lowville in Lewis County, New York. It consists of rectangular, stone, gable roofed main block erected in 1831 and an attached gable roofed wing added in 1906. The front facade features a pavilion with triangular pediment surmounted by a staged wood bell tower that contains the "town clock."

It was listed on the National Register of Historic Places in 2007.
