= Daniel McCormick (banker) =

Daniel McCormick (1739/40 – 1834) was an Irish-born businessman who lived most of his life in New York City, where he was a founding director of the Bank of New York. He was a partner in Macomb's Purchase, in which about one-tenth of the land in the state of New York was acquired.

== Early life ==
McCormick was born in Ballybeen, a town in County Down in what became Northern Ireland, in either 1739 or 1740. McCormick arrived in the United States in 1766.

During the Revolutionary War, he served as a lieutenant in a patriot militia unit, until the British occupation of New York City. As a recognized neutral during the occupation, he escaped confiscation of his property.

After the occupation ended, McCormack worked for an auctioneering company named Moore, Lynsen and Company and made a fortune in the sale of prizes during the Revolutionary War. By 1784, he had won election to the newly formed New York Chamber of Commerce.

== Life on Wall Street ==
McCormick became well known among New York social circles that included Hamilton, John Jay, John Adams, and the artist Gilbert Stuart. His business offices at 39 Wall Street were close to Federal Hall, the meeting place for the Continental Congress between 1785 and 1789 under the Articles of Confederation. His home at 57 Wall Street became a social hub for acquaintances including Hamilton, whose law office in 1789 was in a neighboring building at 58 Wall Street.

Life at McCormick's house in 1789–90 was described as follows:

Little went on in Federal Hall without his comment, if not his knowledge. And when Congress dismissed for the day, and statesmen and socialites took their Wall Street airing, Mr. McCormick and his cronies had a word about each. Let the Secretary of War lumber past that observatory stoop, and the latest quip would be whispered concerning General Knox's unfortunate bulk – "Mrs John Adams' daughter says 'he is not half so fat as he was'; she means before he wore stays". And when chubby John Adams himself strutted by "like a monkey just put into breeches", the stoop recalled how Senator Izard proposed that the Vice-President be titled "His Rotundity".

== Bank of New York ==
The Bank of New York was founded as a result of a meeting of New York merchants on February 23, 1784; it was the first bank created in the independent United States, and its prime organizer, and author of its constitution, was Alexander Hamilton. The board of directors was elected on March 15, and included McCormick, Hamilton, Samuel Franklin, Isaac Roosevelt, and John Vanderbilt. When the Bank of New York was incorporated in 1791, a total of 723 shares worth $500 each were issued. With 15 shares, McCormick was one of the five biggest shareholders. Aaron Burr owned three shares and Alexander Hamilton owned one and a half shares. In 1792, the bank's stock became the first corporate shares to be traded on the newly-founded New York Stock Exchange.

== The Macomb Purchase ==
Alexander Macomb (1748–1831) was a Belfast-born merchant who had made money during the war as a fur trader in Michigan and then moved to New York to become a land speculator and shipping magnate. In 1788, he built a large mansion at 39 Broadway, which in 1790 was leased to become George Washington's presidential residence.

In 1791, Macomb bought a tract of 3.6 million acres (15,000 km^{2}) in upper New York state that became known as "Macomb's Purchase". He bought it for eight cents an acre with no down payment, and agreed to pay off the amount in six annual installments. Macomb was actually just the front man for the purchase, which was made by a group that included Daniel McCormick and William Constable, another merchant who had also made his money in the fur trade and was one of the first Americans to trade with China. The purchase covered about one-tenth of New York state, and included all of present-day Lewis County and large parts of Oswego County, St. Lawrence County, Franklin County, and Jefferson County. It contained only a few squatters, and consisted of good farmland.

The land was put up for sale, with Constable even going to Europe to try to make sales there. During the gubernatorial election of 1792 there were charges that Governor George Clinton stood to benefit from the transaction because of his friendship with McCormick, who allegedly held a third of the tract and planned to transfer part of it to Clinton; McCormick denied this. Besides, he was a federalist when Clinton was an anti-federalist. Sales did not keep up with the due dates for payments on the loan, and during the Panic of 1792 Macomb was sent to debtors' prison with debts of more than $300,000, a fortune at the time. The land was divided among McCormick, Constable, and the creditors, and was sold and re-sold during the 1790s. Clinton sued his accusers for libel, and won the case.

== Personal life and final years ==
An Irish Presbyterian, McCormick served as a trustee of Brick Presbyterian Church.

In 1784, he became founder and first president of an Irish-American charitable and social organization, the Society of the Friendly Sons of St. Patrick in the City of New York.

McCormick was appointed a trustee of the New York Society Library in 1801.

The character of McCormick's later years was described by Walter Barrett as follows:

Mr. McCormick was a glorious sample of the old New Yorker. He stuck to Wall Street to the last. Death alone could get him out of it. He died in 1834, and from 1792 until that date he never budged an inch out of the honored old street. He witnessed the removal of his neighbors one by one, year after year, until all had gone. He saw offices and business crowding into the cellar and floors and garrets of the vacated buildings; he saw new buildings put up for offices; but he was firm, and finally was left alone, the only gentleman who continued to reside in his own house, in the good old fashioned style. He never changed his habits. He stuck to short breeches and white stockings and buckles to the last. He wore hair-powder as long as he lived, and believed in curls. He was without a stain upon his character. He was fond of his friends, and they loved him, although he saw nearly all of them enter the grave. He gave good dinner parties, and had choice old wines upon the table. In his invitations for dinner he invited three, or five, or seven persons to dine with him, but never an even number; and he was always anxious to have those come that he invited, so that ill-luck might not chance by one not coming, thus giving the unlucky even number of persons to entertain. After dinner came a good old game of whist for one or two tables, according as he invited more or less. He was fond of the game, and his friends also were good whist player[s]. He owned a large landed property, and when he died was very rich. On those days, and for years, the great topic of conversation was Bonaparte.

McCormick died in 1834, and his house was torn down not long afterwards, and in 1836-42 the Merchant's Exchange was built on its site at 55-57 Wall Street. The building was later home to the New York Stock Exchange and to the United States Custom House.
