= Charles Melville Dewey =

American painter

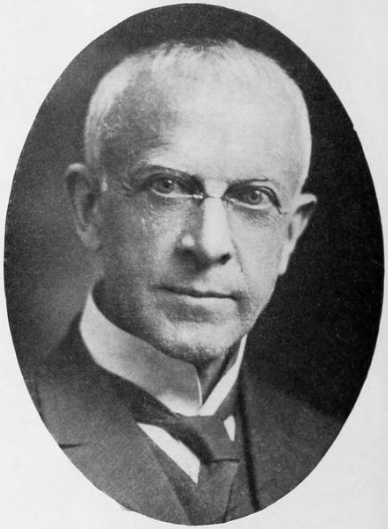
- Born: 1849; Lowville, New York, US
- Died: January 17, 1937 (aged 87); New York, New York, US
- Education: National Academy of Design
- Occupation: Artist

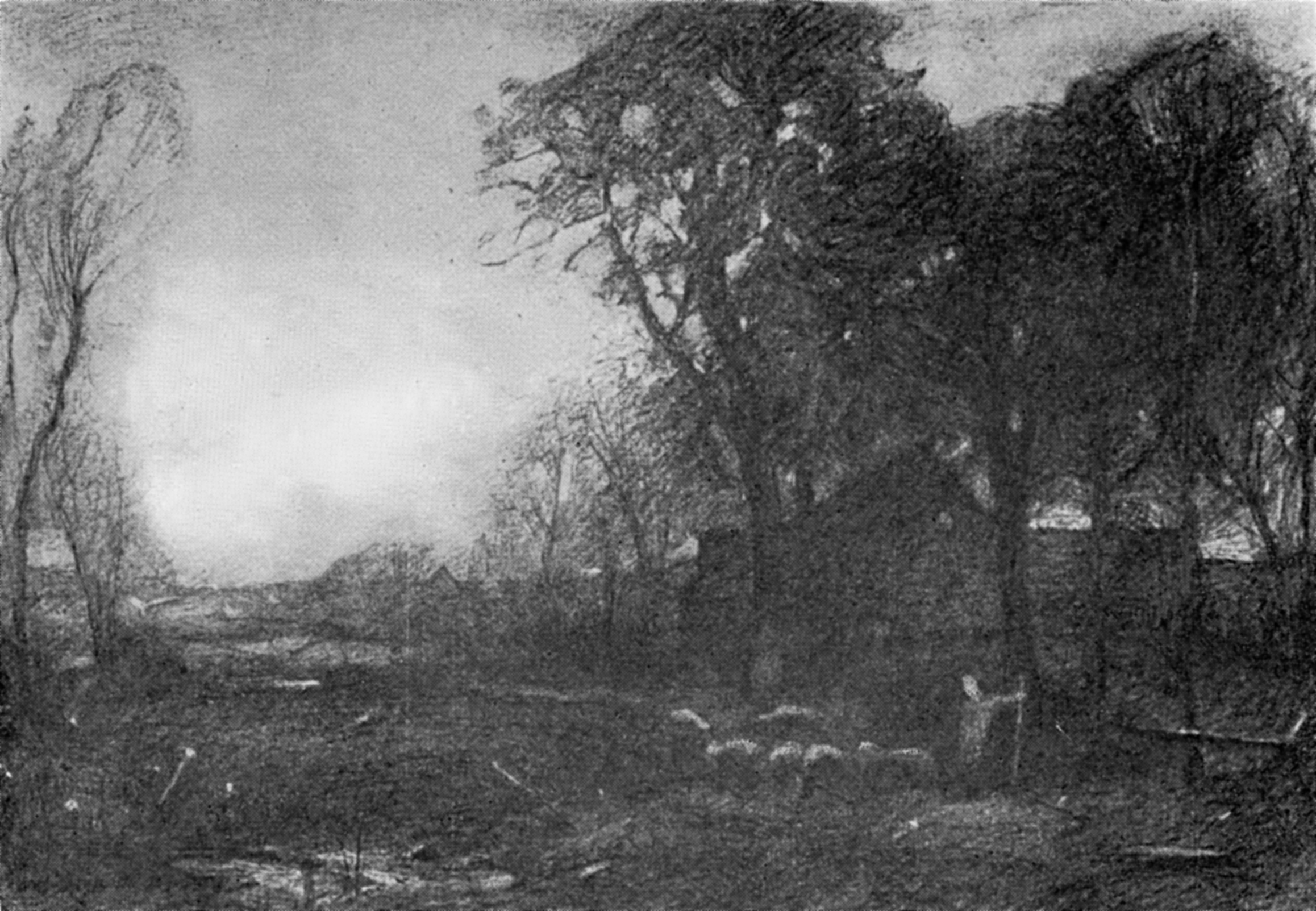
Black-and-white reproduction of Charles Melville Dewey's Sunshine and Shadow

Charles Melville Dewey (1849–1937) was an American tonalist painter. He was born in Lowville, New York. Confined to his bed from his twelfth to his seventeenth year by a hip disease, he formed the poetic conception of nature which appears in his pictures. He studied in the schools of the National Academy of Design, New York (1874–76), and in Paris under Carolus-Duran, whom he assisted to paint a ceiling in the Louvre. In 1878 he returned to New York. Dewey's work has much highly individual, poetic sentiment and generally depicts subdued morning and evening effects. His landscapes in oil and water color are in many public galleries and private collections in the United States. Among his best are:

- Indian Summer and A November Evening (1904)
- Morning Bay of St.Ives and The Brook (1905)
- The Edge of the Forest (formerly Corcoran Gallery, Washington)
- The Harvest Moon and The Close of Day (National Gallery, Washington)
- The Gray Robe of Twilight (Buffalo Gallery)
- Old Fields (Pennsylvania Academy, Philadelphia)

He was made a member of the National Academy of Design in 1907.

He died at the Hotel Chelsea in Manhattan on January 17, 1937.
