= Beaver Falls Grange Hall No. 554 =

- U.S. National Register of Historic Places
- Location within New York Location within the United States
- Location: 9577 Main St., Beaver Falls, New York
- Coordinates: 43°53′08″N 75°25′52″W
- Area: 0.38 acres (0.15 ha)
- Built: 1892, 1915
- NRHP reference No.: 15000852
- Added to NRHP: December 1, 2015

Beaver Falls Grange Hall No. 554 is a historic Grange hall located at Beaver Falls in Lewis County, New York. It was built in 1892, and is a two-story, wood-frame building measuring 30 feet wide and 60 feet deep. It sits on a fieldstone foundation and has a front gable roof. It features a one-story, hipped roof front porch. The first floor was converted to a store in 1915.

It was listed on the National Register of Historic Places in 2015.
