= Lowville Masonic Temple =

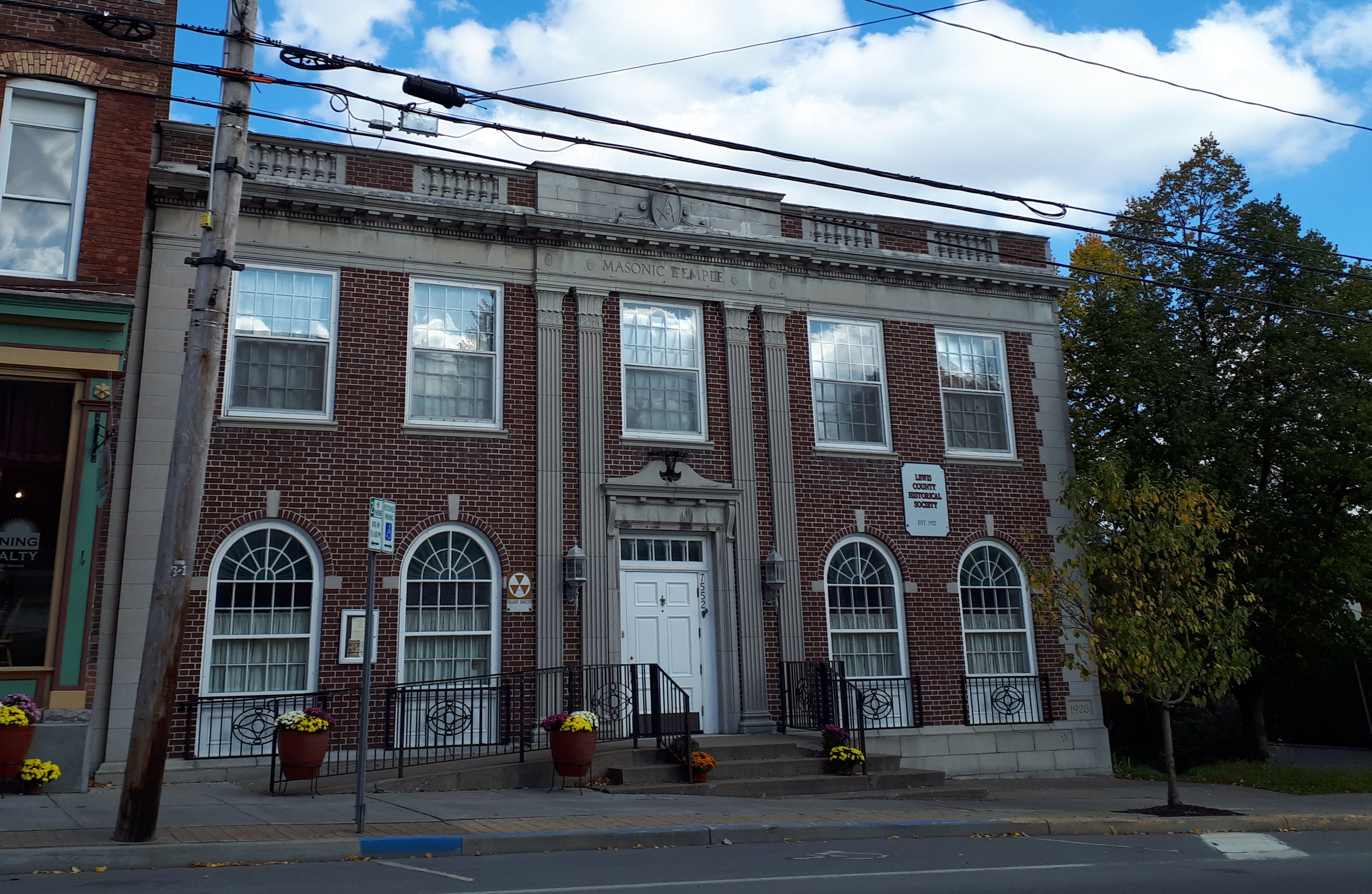
- The building in 2018
- Interactive map of the Lowville Masonic Temple area

General information
- Architectural style: Colonial Revival
- Location: 7552 S. State St., Lowville, New York
- Coordinates: 43.78597°N 75.49143°W
- Completed: 1928

Design and construction
- Architects: Sluyter, R.E.
- Lowville Masonic Temple
- U.S. National Register of Historic Places
- NRHP reference No.: 08000919
- Added to NRHP: December 19, 2012

The Lowville Masonic Temple is a historic Colonial Revival building located in Lowville, New York. The building was constructed in 1928 as a meeting hall for the local Masonic lodge.

In 2002 it was sold to the Lewis County Historical Society, and was used as a local history museum.

It was listed on the National Register of Historic Places on December 19, 2012.
