= Port Leyden, New York =

Port Leyden, New York Kelsey's Mills
- Village
- Location within New York Location within the United States
- Coordinates: 43°35′2″N 75°20′39″W
- Country: United States
- State: New York
- County: Lewis
- Towns: Leyden, Lyonsdale

Area
  - Total: 0.66 sq mi (1.70 km^{2})
  - Land: 0.62 sq mi (1.60 km^{2})
  - Water: 0.042 sq mi (0.11 km^{2})
- Elevation: 892 ft (272 m)

Population (2020)
  - Total: 554
  - Density: 897.8/sq mi (346.65/km^{2})
- Time zone: UTC-5 (Eastern (EST))
  - Summer (DST): UTC-4 (EDT)
- ZIP code: 13433
- Area code: 315
- FIPS code: 36-59454
- GNIS feature ID: 960975
- Website: https://villageofportleyden.org/

Port Leyden is a village in Lewis County, New York, United States. As of the 2020 census, Port Leyden had a population of 554. The name is derived from the village's early history as a port on the Black River Canal.

The village of Port Leyden is mostly in the town of Leyden, but a portion of the village lies to the east of the Black River in the town of Lyonsdale. The village is 17 miles (27 km) south of Lowville, the county seat, 8 miles (13 km) north of Boonville, and 25 miles (40 km) by road west-southwest of Old Forge.

== History ==
A mill was built at the present site of the village around 1800, and the community was known as "Kelsey's Mills". The name was changed to "Port Leyden" around 1838 when the Black River Canal was being developed. The canal was completed to Port Leyden in 1850, but was not usable until 1851. The canal reached its northern terminus at Lyons Falls, a few miles north, in 1855. In 1900, a decision was made to abandon the canal between Lyons Falls and Boonville, effectively ending the status of Port Leyden as a canal port.

St. Mark's Church and the Edmund Wilson House are listed on the National Register of Historic Places.

== Geography ==
Port Leyden is located in southern Lewis County at 43°35′2″N 75°20′39″W (43.583871, -75.344261). According to the United States Census Bureau, the village has a total area of 0.66 square miles (1.7 km^{2}), of which 0.62 square miles (1.6 km^{2}) are land and 0.04 square miles (0.1 km^{2}), or 6.17%, are water.

The Black River divides the community and drops over 30 feet (9 m) through the village limits.

Port Leyden is located on New York State Route 12, which leads north to Lowville and south to Boonville.

== Education ==
Port Leyden Elementary School located on Lincoln Street is now closed. The school previously educated students in grades K-4.

The Port Leyden Community Library is located on Canal Street.

== Demographics ==
Historical population
Census	Pop.	Note	%±
1870	977		—
1890	462		—
1900	746		61.5%
1910	764		2.4%
1920	735		−3.8%
1930	717		−2.4%
1940	794		10.7%
1950	841		5.9%
1960	898		6.8%
1970	862		−4.0%
1980	740		−14.2%
1990	723		−2.3%
2000	665		−8.0%
2010	672		1.1%
2020	554		−17.6%
U.S. Decennial Census

As of the census of 2000, there were 665 people, 257 households, and 169 families residing in the village. The population density was 1,099.5 inhabitants per square mile (424.5/km^{2}). There were 317 housing units at an average density of 524.1 per square mile (202.4/km^{2}). The racial makeup of the village was 98.50% White, 0.15% African American, 0.15% Native American, and 1.20% from two or more races. Hispanic or Latino of any race were 0.15% of the population.

There were 257 households, out of which 33.1% had children under the age of 18 living with them, 51.0% were married couples living together, 12.5% had a female householder with no husband present, and 33.9% were non-families. 30.7% of all households were made up of individuals, and 21.0% had someone living alone who was 65 years of age or older. The average household size was 2.49 and the average family size was 3.08.

In the village, the population was spread out, with 27.1% under the age of 18, 7.4% from 18 to 24, 24.7% from 25 to 44, 21.8% from 45 to 64, and 19.1% who were 65 years of age or older. The median age was 37 years. For every 100 females, there were 92.8 males. For every 100 females age 18 and over, there were 89.5 males.

The median income for a household in the village was $24,559, and the median income for a family was $30,781. Males had a median income of $31,146 versus $17,500 for females. The per capita income for the village was $12,783. About 18.0% of families and 23.7% of the population were below the poverty line, including 38.9% of those under age 18 and 20.9% of those age 65 or over.
