= Constable Hall =

Historic house in New York, United States

- U.S. National Register of Historic Places
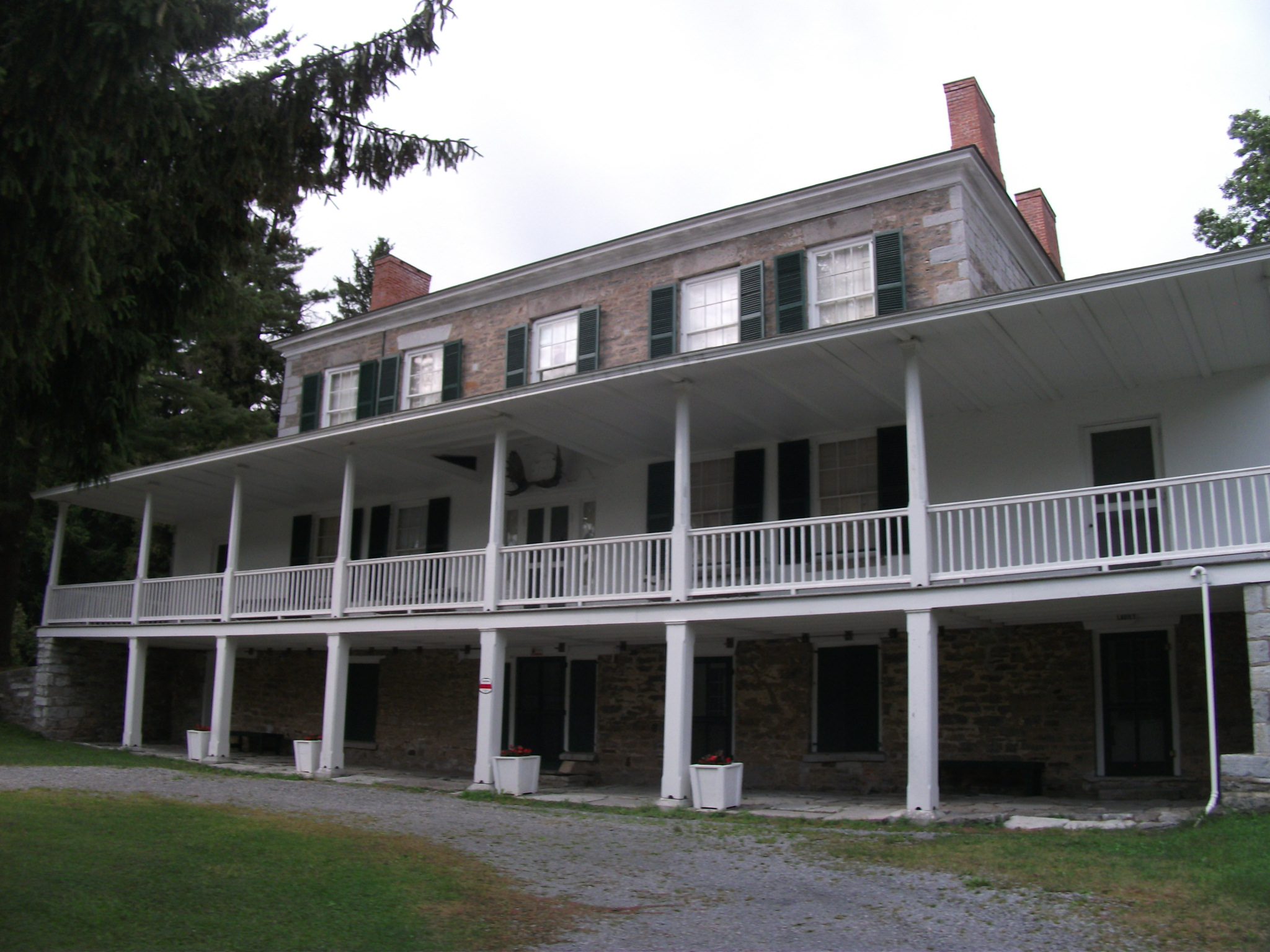
- Constable Hall, June 2011

- Location within New York Location within the United States
- Location: Off NY 26, Constableville, New York
- Coordinates: 43°33′43″N 75°25′24″W
- Area: 22.4 acres (9.1 ha)
- Built: 1810
- Architect: Constable, William Jr.
- Architectural style: Federal
- NRHP reference No.: 73001197
- Added to NRHP: March 7, 1973

Constable Hall is a historic home located at Constableville in Lewis County, New York. It was built between 1810 and 1819 and is a two-story, rectangular Federal style limestone building with two 1-story wings. A U-shaped courtyard is created by the west side of the house and the two-story frame servants quarters to the south and carriage house to the north. The front features a two-story pedimented portico with paired attenuated free-standing Doric order columns on each side of the doorway.

It was listed on the National Register of Historic Places in 1973.

It is rumored that the famous poem "A Visit from St. Nicolas", (known more commonly as "'Twas the Night Before Christmas"), by Clement Clarke Moore was written about this building for two reasons. The first reason was that Moore was the cousin of Mary Eliza, the wife of Constable Hall architect, William Constable Jr. The second being that in the poem, the narrator "tore open the shutters and threw up the sash" referencing interior shutters, in which Constable Hall has.

== Gallery ==
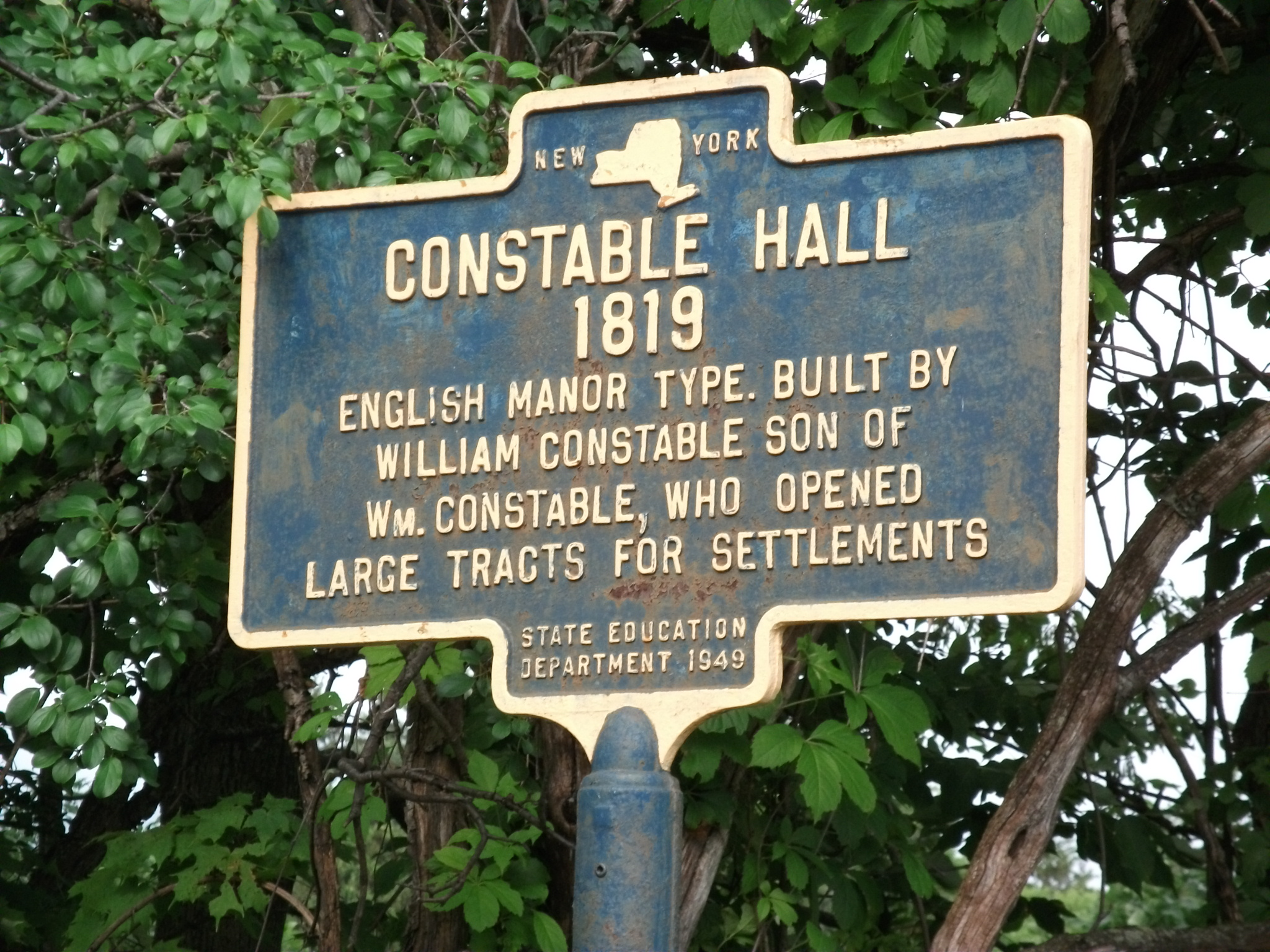
New York State historic marker, June 2011
