= Lewis County Soldiers' and Sailors' Monument =

Historic place in New York, United States

- U.S. National Register of Historic Places
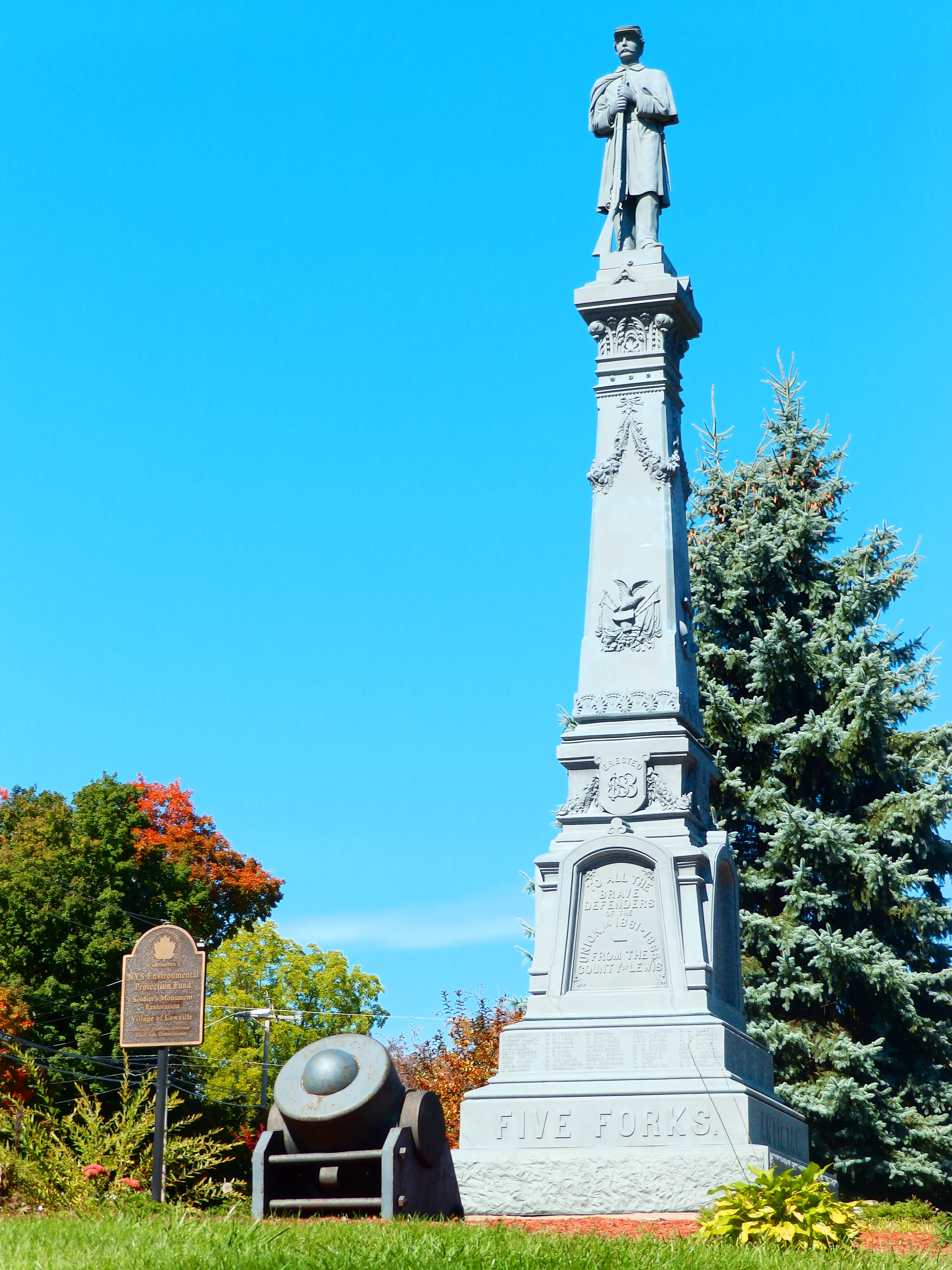

- Location within New York Location within the United States
- Location: Village Green, NY 26 and Bostwick Sts., Lowville, New York
- Coordinates: 43°47′27.33″N 75°29′44.13″W
- Area: 0.3 acres (0.12 ha)
- NRHP reference No.: 09000575
- Added to NRHP: July 29, 2009

Lewis County Soldiers' and Sailors' Monument is a historic American Civil War monument located at Lowville in Lewis County, New York. It was built in 1883 by Monumental Bronze Company of Bridgeport, Connecticut, and is constructed of sand-cast zinc. It is 20 feet high and 78 inches square and consists of five parts: a three stepped base, a plinth, a tapered column, a capital, and on the top a soldier.

It was listed on the National Register of Historic Places in 2009.
