= Bateman Hotel (Lowville, New York) =

- U.S. National Register of Historic Places
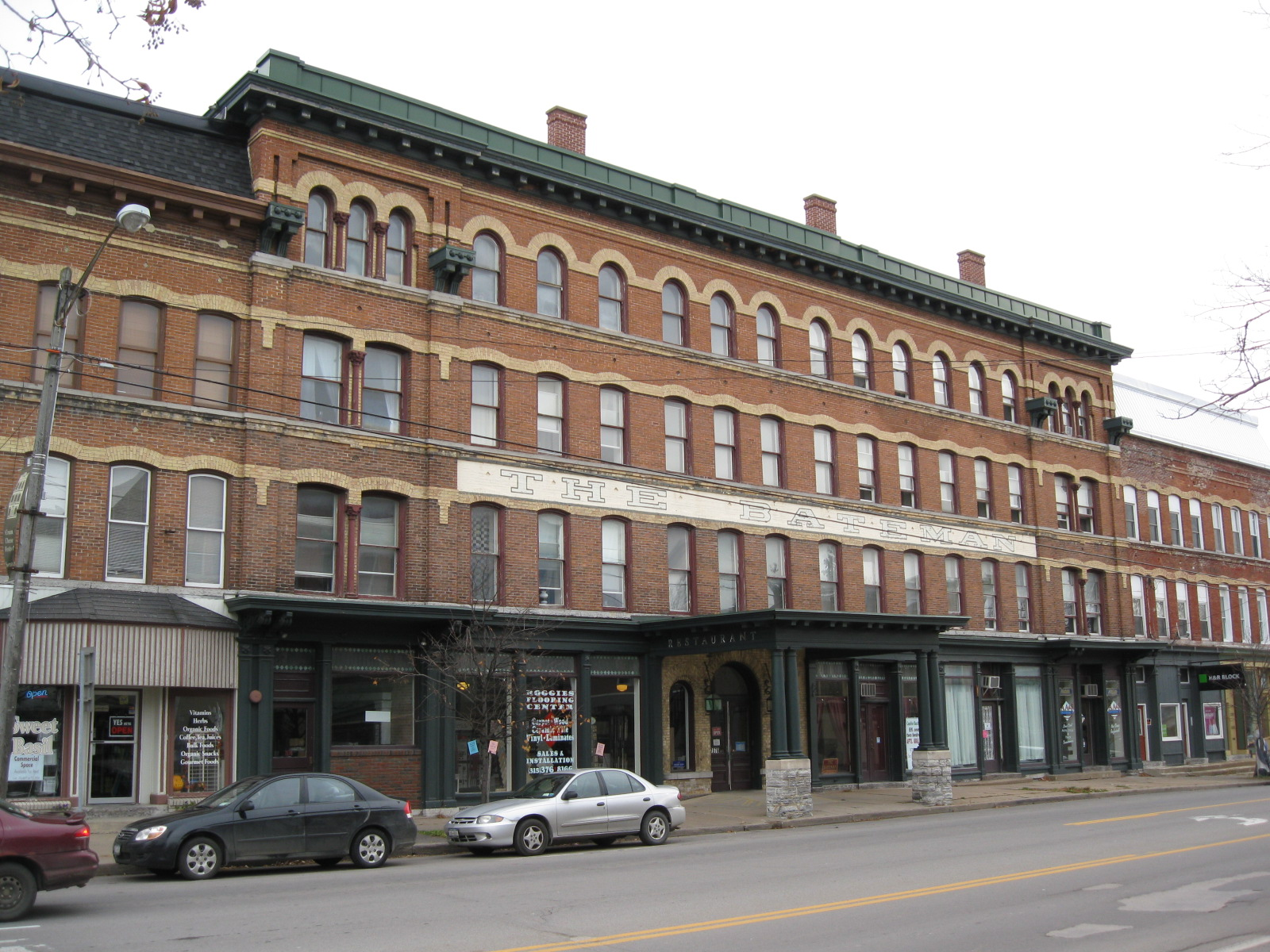
- Bateman Hotel, November 2009

- Location within New York Location within the United States
- Location: 7574 S. State St., Lowville, New York
- Coordinates: 43°47′10″N 75°29′31″W
- Area: less than one acre
- Architect: Metcalf and Derring
- Architectural style: Italianate, Second Empire
- NRHP reference No.: 94000046
- Added to NRHP: February 18, 1994

The Bateman Hotel, previously known as Howell Hotel or Kellogg Hotel, located in Lowville, New York, is now a conglomerate of condos. At one time, it was a hotel with a kitchen, a dining room, and a saloon. The hotel is listed in the National Register of Historic Places.

== History ==
The hotel was built in 1869 to replace a predecessor hotel, after the downtown area was burnt in a fire in January 1869.

A livery barn from c. 1874 is a contributing structure on the property.

The hotel was owned in the 1950s through 1980 by Harold and Marion Mahar. After Harold's death in the late 1960s, Marion (called "Mother Mahar" by the locals) continued to run the hotel until her retirement in the early 1980s.

It was listed on the National Register of Historic Places in 1994.

== Description ==
The Bateman Hotel (1869) is located on the east side of State Street just south of Shady Avenue in the commercial downtown district of Lowville, Lewis County. The surrounding commercial district, which has been identified as an eligible State/National Registers Historic District, consists of a distinctive and well-preserved grouping of mid-late 19th century architecture representing the period of Lowville's greatest growth and prosperity. The Bateman Hotel is one of the most prominent and architecturally distinctive buildings within the district, occupying the center building in a massive four-story brick commercial block which dominates the downtown street-scape. Architecturally, the design and detailing of the Bateman Hotel incorporate characteristics of the Italianate and Second Empire styles popular during the latter half of the 19th century.

The Bateman Hotel is the center building in a commercial block of unified design and construction. Its main facade is characterized by a molded cornice with decorative brackets and full-height pilasters which break up the wall surface to form a pattern of 2-12-2 bays across the front. At the north and south ends windows are paired on the second and third stories and grouped in threes on the fourth. Throughout the upper stories windows are 1/1 sash set in round arches which are accentuated by full arch crowns on the fourth story. Belt courses separate the upper stories. A contrasting yellow brick coursing follows the top of the window heads on all three stories with limestone belt coursing at the sills. The first story contains three storefronts and the hotel's public space. The Colonial Revival porte-cochere with round Doric columns resting on cut stone piers which highlights the main entry, and the large paned glass storefronts reflect c. 1909 renovations to the first story. The hotel's original main entrance had only a small extended weather roof which was replaced in 1874 by a hexagonal veranda, and again in 1909 with the present porte-cochere.

The rear (eastern) elevation of the Bateman Hotel is a plain brick facade resting on a random ashlar limestone base. Perpendicular to the main block on its north end is a three-story 4x3 bay brick wing with one-story covered wood porch. Adjacent to the porch on the north end is a one-story, wood-frame enclosed section. Windows in the rear elevation contain 1/1 sash with plain stone sills and soldier course brick lintels. To meet current day building code requirements, a four-story brick, 3x1 bay elevator shaft/stairtower addition has recently been added (part of the tax credit project) to the rear of the building.

The first floor of the Bateman Hotel is divided into three areas. The first area contains the public space which includes the lobby, dining room, restaurant and bar, all interconnected; the second is the service space located in the rear section of the building which contains the kitchen and bathroom facilities; the third is the commercial space consisting of three storefronts located at the south end of the building. Dominant features of the hotel's interior include the centralized grand circular staircase that rises directly from the first floor through the fourth floor, and the longitudinal orientation of the double-loaded main corridors in a north–south direction on the upper floors which are connected to the main stairway by short passageways. The main corridor does not divide the building equally; rooms along the west side (front) of the building are typically two deep, while those along the east side (rear) are only a single room deep. The second and third floors' plans are almost identical, while the fourth floor differs only in that there is no rear section extending from the fourth floor. Two original stairways located at either end of the main corridors, which led to the now-removed corner towers, have been closed off. The rear wing of the building which originally contained the service area, has a double loaded corridor running east–west with a series of small rooms on either side.

With the exception of the first floor, which was renovated in 1909, original finishes throughout the hotel have been largely retained. They include: grained molded wood trim around doors, windows and baseboards (secondary rooms have only plain baseboards and moldings), six-panelled transomed doors off corridors into most rooms, plaster arches resting on wood brackets dividing sections of the hallway, and the four-story spiral stairway with full decorative wood balustrade. Extant first floor finishes reflecting the 1909 renovations include: plaster walls in some locations, heave decorative wood moldings, and pressed metal ceilings. the black and white (checkered) marble tile floor dates to 1876.

The historic architectural integrity of the Bateman Hotel has been very well preserved with its original form, fenestration and fabric largely intact. Alterations to the building's original exterior have been limited to the 1909 renovations to the first floor storefronts and main entry, the c. 1960 removal of the domed cupolas from the building's north and south ends, replacement window sash (4/4 with 1/1), and the recent addition of a four-story stair tower to the rear of the building. An original passageway which cut through the hotel on its north side to allow the passage of carriages from State Street to the rear of the building has been closed off; in its place is a commercial establishment(bar).

Other noteworthy features of the Bateman Hotel are the historic large painted signs on the brickwork. On the rear extension is painted "The Bateman", under which the previous sign for the "Kellogg House" can still be made out. "The Bateman" is also painted on the street facade between the second and third floors and, again, "Kellogg House" is clearly discernible underneath.

A contributing feature on the property is the c. 1874 livery barn located to the rear (east) of the Bateman Hotel in what is currently the parking area for the hotel. It is a 1 1/2-story heavy timber-framed structure with board and batten siding and a standing seam metal roof.

== Other ==
The Bateman is located on Lowville's main road, State Street. As a large four-story building, it "dominates" the downtown area.
