= Constableville, New York =

Constableville, New York Shalersville
- Village
- Location within New York Location within the United States
- Coordinates: 43°33′53″N 75°25′33″W
- Country: United States
- State: New York
- County: Lewis
- Town: West Turin

Area
  - Total: 1.12 sq mi (2.90 km^{2})
  - Land: 1.12 sq mi (2.90 km^{2})
  - Water: 0 sq mi (0.00 km^{2})
- Elevation: 1,263 ft (385 m)

Population (2020)
  - Total: 293
  - Density: 262.0/sq mi (101.16/km^{2})
- Time zone: UTC-5 (Eastern (EST))
  - Summer (DST): UTC-4 (EDT)
- ZIP code: 13325
- Area code: 315
- FIPS code: 36-17882
- GNIS feature ID: 947326
- Website: https://constablevilleny.gov/

Constableville is a village in Lewis County, New York, United States. As of the 2020 census, Constableville had a population of 293. The village is named after William Constable, the son of an early landowner.

The village is within the town of West Turin and is north of Rome.

== History ==
The village is the site of the first settlement in the town of West Turin, taking place circa 1796.

The Constableville Village Historic District, Jonathan C. Collins House and Cemetery, and Constable Hall are listed on the National Register of Historic Places. Constable Hall, a restored 19th century mansion with original furnishings, was built out of limestone.

== Geography ==
Constableville is located in the eastern part of the town of West Turin at 43°33′53″N 75°25′33″W (43.564642, -75.425883). According to the U.S. Census Bureau, the village has a total area of 1.1 square miles (2.9 km^{2}), all of it recorded as land. The Sugar River, a tributary of the Black River, runs through the village.

Constableville is on New York State Route 26, which leads north 17 miles (27 km) to Lowville, the county seat, and south 26 miles (42 km) to Rome.

=== Adjacent communities ===
Constableville is northeast of Mohawk Hill, southwest of Collinsville, and west of Locust Grove.

== Demographics ==
Historical population
Census	Pop.	Note	%±
1870	712		—
1880	593		−16.7%
1900	450		—
1910	407		−9.6%
1920	380		−6.6%
1930	348		−8.4%
1940	340		−2.3%
1950	378		11.2%
1960	439		16.1%
1970	347		−21.0%
1980	330		−4.9%
1990	307		−7.0%
2000	305		−0.7%
2010	242		−20.7%
2020	293		21.1%
U.S. Decennial Census

As of the census of 2000, there were 305 people, 125 households, and 79 families residing in the village. The population density was 272.4 inhabitants per square mile (105.2/km^{2}). There were 154 housing units at an average density of 137.6 per square mile (53.1/km^{2}). The racial makeup of the village was 100.00% White. Hispanic or Latino of any race were 0.33% of the population.

There were 125 households, out of which 27.2% had children under the age of 18 living with them, 41.6% were married couples living together, 14.4% had a female householder with no husband present, and 36.8% were non-families. 32.0% of all households were made up of individuals, and 17.6% had someone living alone who was 65 years of age or older. The average household size was 2.44 and the average family size was 3.04.

In the village, the population was spread out, with 26.2% under the age of 18, 7.9% from 18 to 24, 28.2% from 25 to 44, 22.0% from 45 to 64, and 15.7% who were 65 years of age or older. The median age was 37 years. For every 100 females, there were 94.3 males. For every 100 females age 18 and over, there were 86.0 males.

The median income for a household in the village was $43,125, and the median income for a family was $47,083. Males had a median income of $48,438 versus $23,750 for females. The per capita income for the village was $16,140. About 11.8% of families and 16.5% of the population were below the poverty line, including 18.9% of those under the age of eighteen and 23.8% of those 65 or over.

== Today ==
Today Constableville is home to 240 plus residents, a gas station/grocery store, a diner, 2 restaurant and bars (The Alpine and Whiskey Jacks), a winery (Roads End Orchards), an antique store, 2 Churches, a Volunteer Fire and Ambulance Department. The village hosts flywheels and pulleys and the C-Ville Fire Department field days yearly
