= Castorland Company =

The Castorland Company, also known as La Compagnie de New York is a company established between 1792 and 1793 in Paris, France, with the intent to invest in lands in northern and northwestern New York. Leading American and French speculators, such as William Constable, Alexander Macomb, and James Donatien Le Ray de Chaumont were involved in this business transaction. Castorland was the location of an attempt to settle the western edge of the Adirondacks in the late 18th century. It was 210,000 acres and went from Lake Ontario into the Adirondack Mountains. The name Castorland, meaning “Land of the Beaver,” came from the abundance of beavers on the land. The Castorland Company sent Simon Desjardins and Peter Pharoux as agents to develop newly acquired landholdings in today’s upstate New York, and they kept a journal that was originally a report to the boss, as their job required. This land was a good place for French émigrés to settle after fleeing from the French Reign of Terror. After the death of Desjardins, mismanagement, and issues that the French people faced, Castorland fell apart and most of the land was left with James LeRay, who sold a huge parcel to Napoleon's brother, Joseph Bonaparte.

== Beavers ==
Beavers were a symbol in Castorland that represented the impact that beavers had on the land and the Castorland Company. The significantly large number of beavers led to the name of the land being Castorland. The definition of the French word “Castor” means beaver. Castorland means “The Land of the Beaver.” The land brimming with beavers caused an increase in fur trade. Beaver pelts were in huge demand for waterproof hats, coats and French high fashion. While the beaver benefited the Castorland company and the residents settling on Castorland, it was a major reason for the downfall of the colony. Giardiasis, known as beaver fever today, had driven many French people away. This sickness was widespread, and no known cure existed. It also never occurred to them to purify or stop drinking the water.

== French Revolution ==
The French Revolution was a revolutionary movement that occurred from 1787 to 1799 and caused some French people to immigrate. This specifically occurred during the French Reign of Terror, a period in the French Revolution from 1793-1794. During this period, the Revolutionary Government decided to take harsh measures against French people who were suspected of being enemies of the Revolution. French émigrés who were fleeing the Reign of Terror came to Castorland, as they believed that it was an idealistic community. Stock shares sold quickly to investors and French nobility. Castorland promised “all benefits of liberty with none of the drawbacks”, however the Castorland Company mistreated French people. Many French settlers continued arriving in North America, but they were predominantly peasants and/or settled in urban areas. In 1797, New York State passed a law that prevented French émigrés from owning land and not many French landowners remained. Furthermore, Giardiasis also caused many settlers to leave. The unplanned hardships, poor management, and Napoleon Bonaparte welcoming nobility back to France in 1802, sealed the colony’s fate.
