= Beaver Falls, New York =

- Hamlet
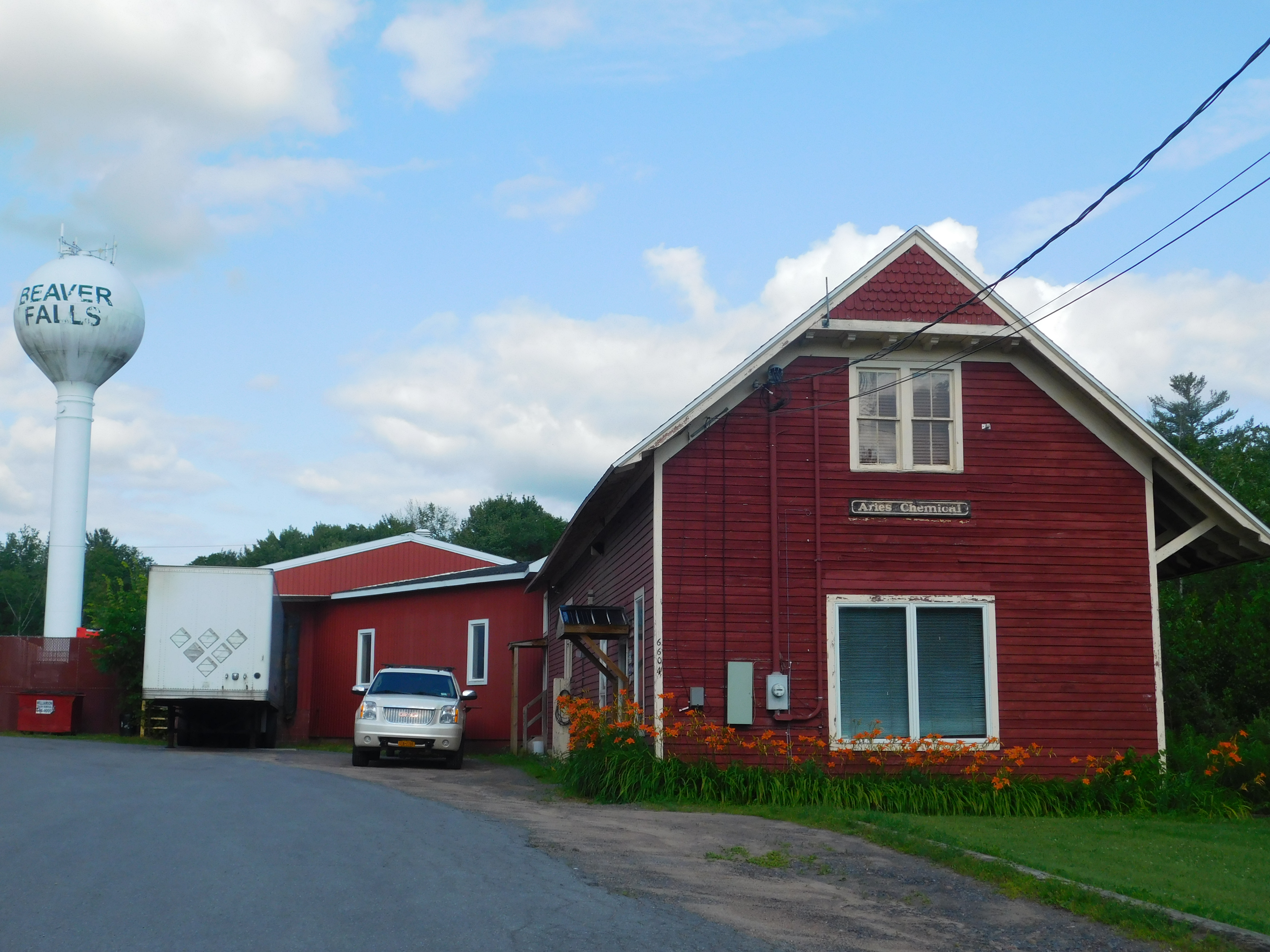
- The former railroad station in Beaver Falls

- Location in the state of New York
- Coordinates: 43°53′13″N 75°25′39″W
- Country: United States
- State: New York
- County: Lewis
- Town: Croghan
- Elevation: 807 ft (246 m)
- Time zone: UTC-5 (Eastern (EST))
  - Summer (DST): UTC-4 (EDT)
- ZIP code: 13305
- Area code: 315
- GNIS feature ID: 943383

Beaver Falls is a hamlet in the town of Croghan, west of the village of Croghan, in Lewis County, New York, United States. The hamlet had a population of around 500 in 2007.

The hamlet is split into two sections divided by the Beaver River, which flows down from the village of Croghan. Three bridges cross the river, two vehicle bridges at the upper and lower ends of the hamlet, and a third railway trestle that crosses the river in the center. Main Street, once a busy district during the early 20th century, is now the site of a blacktop business, Beaver Falls Health Clinic, the post office, two churches, a deli, a pizza restaurant and a town park, as well as the Omniafiltra plant, the Beaver Falls Library and the Beaver Falls Volunteer Fire Department.

The hamlet of Beaver Falls, in the 1850s, was all farmland. The land was owned by the Farneys and was passed down for many decades. The house is still in this local hamlet. In the 20th century, the Farneys sold the farmland and houses and churches were built.

The Beaver Falls Grange Hall No. 554 and Harry and Molly Lewis House are listed on the National Register of Historic Places.

== Industry ==
Beaver Falls, once a turn of the century industrial center, has two paper mills. Interface Solutions operates in the former J.P. Lewis Company Mill on the western edge of the hamlet. Omniafiltra, an Italian-owned filtration paper manufacturer, runs the former Latex Mill in the center of the hamlet.

The Beaver Falls Generating Facility is a 95-megawatt co-generation power plant situated along the Beaver River banks on the west edge of the hamlet. The plant, completed in 1995, produces power for the New York state energy grid using both natural gas and #2 fuel oil. It is owned and operated by WPS Power Development, which purchased the plant in May 2002. The plant also supplies steam to the Omniafiltra mill, located just east on the river's same side.
