= Nathaniel Egleston =

Nathaniel Hillyer Egleston (May 7, 1822 – August 24, 1912) was an American clergyman and forester who served as the second chief of the United States Division of Forestry, which would later become the U.S. Forest Service. Born in Hartford, Connecticut, he graduated from Yale College in 1840, continuing to study theology at the Yale Divinity School. He helped found the American Congregational Union in 1853 and was one of the founders of the Chicago Theological Seminary, and an editor of the Congregational Herald. In 1882 he became a vice president of the American Forestry Association, and served as chief of the Division of Forestry from 1883 to 1886.
