= Talcottville, New York =

Talcottville, New York Leyden
- Hamlet
- Location within New York Location within the United States
- Coordinates: 43°32′00″N 75°21′55″W
- Country: United States
- State: New York
- County: Lewis
- Town: Leyden
- Elevation: 1,135 ft (346 m)
- Time zone: UTC-5 (Eastern (EST))
  - Summer (DST): UTC-4 (EDT)
- ZIP code: 13309 (Boonville)
- Area code: 315
- GNIS feature ID: 967005

Talcottville is a small community in southern Lewis County, New York, United States. It is the seat for the town of Leyden.

Talcottville was the first settlement in Lewis County. William Topping and his family settled in 1793 on what is now the northwest corner of State Route 12D and Domser Road.

Active businesses in the hamlet include the Talcottville Cemetery Association, Fox Den Monuments LLC, Karpinski Water Supply, and portions of three active dairy farms.

The author and critic Edmund Wilson was a summer resident, and wrote Upstate: Records and Recollections of Northern New York (New York: Farrar, Straus & Giroux, 1971; reprint, Syracuse: Syracuse University Press, 1990), a memoir of his time in Talcottville.
