= Lowville (village), New York =

Lowville, New York
- Village
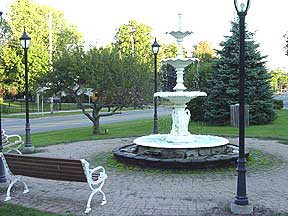
- Fountain in Lowville

- Location within New York Location within the United States
- Coordinates: 43°47′12″N 75°29′16″W
- Country: United States
- State: New York
- County: Lewis
- Town: Lowville
- Settled: 1797
- Incorporated: 1847
- Rechartered: 1858

Government
  - Mayor: Joseph Beagle

Area
  - Total: 1.91 sq mi (4.95 km^{2})
  - Land: 1.91 sq mi (4.95 km^{2})
  - Water: 0 sq mi (0.00 km^{2})
- Elevation: 879 ft (268 m)

Population (2020)
  - Total: 3,272
  - Density: 1,712.1/sq mi (661.06/km^{2})
- Time zone: UTC-5 (Eastern (EST))
  - Summer (DST): UTC-4 (EDT)
- ZIP code: 13367
- Area code: 315
- FIPS code: 36-43720
- GNIS feature ID: 2390950
- Website: villageoflowville.gov

Lowville /ˈlaʊvɪl/ is a village in Lewis County, New York, United States. As of the 2010 census it had a population of 3,470. The village is in the Black River Valley, between the foothills of the Adirondack Mountains and the Tug Hill Plateau, in an area often referred to as the North Country. It is located in the center of Lewis County, in the southeastern part of the similarly named town of Lowville.

Lowville is the county seat of Lewis County. The name of both the village and town is derived from Nicholas Low, an early landowner of Dutch descent, who had emigrated with his wife and three small children from a rural village outside of Amsterdam in 1778.

== History ==
Silas Stow, an early settler, established himself in Lowville in 1797. The village of Lowville was incorporated in 1847 and charter was adopted in 1854. It was rechartered in 1858 and designated the county seat in 1864, succeeding the community of Martinsburg.

Within the village, the Franklin B. Hough House is a National Historic Landmark, and it, along with the Bateman Hotel, Lewis County Fairgrounds, Lewis County Soldiers' and Sailors' Monument, Lowville Presbyterian Church, and Stoddard–O'Connor House are listed on the National Register of Historic Places.

== Geography ==
Lowville is located in central Lewis County in the southeast part of the town of Lowville. According to the United States Census Bureau, the village has a total area of 1.9 square miles (4.9 km^{2}), all land. It is just west of the Black River, and Mill Creek flows eastward through the village to the river.

The village is at the junction of state routes 12, 26 and 812. Route 12 leads northwest 27 miles (43 km) to Watertown and south-southeast 55 miles (89 km) to Utica, while Route 26 leads north-northwest 24 miles (39 km) to Fort Drum and south 42 miles (68 km) to Rome. Route 812 leads north-northeast 30 miles (48 km) to Harrisville.

Whetstone Gulf, a 3-mile-long (4.8 km) canyon cut into the eastern side of the Tug Hill Plateau, is 7 miles (11 km) south of the village. The canyon is part of Whetstone Gulf State Park.

== Demographics ==
Historical population
Census	Pop.	Note	%±
1890	2,511		—
1900	2,352		−6.3%
1910	2,940		25.0%
1920	3,127		6.4%
1930	3,423		9.5%
1940	3,578		4.5%
1950	3,671		2.6%
1960	3,616		−1.5%
1970	3,671		1.5%
1980	3,364		−8.4%
1990	3,632		8.0%
2000	3,476		−4.3%
2010	3,470		−0.2%
2020	3,272		−5.7%
U.S. Decennial Census

As of the census of 2000, there were 3,476 people, 1,403 households, and 882 families residing in the village. The population density was 1,830.8 inhabitants per square mile (706.9/km^{2}). There were 1,588 housing units at an average density of 836.4 per square mile (322.9/km^{2}). In terms of racial composition, the village was 96.66% White, 0.75% Black or African American, 0.40% Native American, 0.83% Asian, 0.75% from other races, and 0.60% from two or more races. Additionally, 1.01% of the population identified as Hispanic or Latino.

There were 1,403 households, out of which 32.1% had children under the age of 18 living with them, 48.5% were married couples living together, 11.1% had a female householder with no husband present, and 37.1% were non-families. 33.5% of all households were made up of individuals, and 18.1% had someone living alone who was 65 years of age or older. The average household size was 2.34 and the average family size was 2.99.

In the village, the population was spread out, with 25.8% under the age of 18, 6.8% from 18 to 24, 25.4% from 25 to 44, 20.5% from 45 to 64, and 21.5% who were 65 years of age or older. The median age was 40 years. For every 100 females, there were 83.8 males. For every 100 females age 18 and over, there were 79.2 males.

The median income for a household in the village was $32,841, and the median income for a family was $42,399. Males had a median income of $31,831 versus $21,422 for females. The per capita income for the village was $17,172. About 13.9% of families and 14.9% of the population were below the poverty line, including 18.5% of those under age 18 and 17.8% of those age 65 or over.

== Government ==
Governmental offices and services for the village, the town, and the county are all located in Lowville, as is the Lewis County Courthouse, which houses the state supreme court, as well as the county, family, and surrogate's courts.

Lowville's mayor is Joe Beagle. Village judges are Jennifer Scordo and Rikki Stanton. Village clerk is Pamela Roes.

== Economy ==
Lowville is a manufacturing hub, with one of the largest Kraft factories the company has producing all the company's Cream cheese and Cheese sticks. Next door to Kraft is the QubicaAMF bowling pin factory, the largest bowling pin factory in the world. There are also several paper mills around the area.

== Infrastructure ==
=== Health care ===
Lowville is home to Lewis County General Hospital which is the second largest hospital in the Lewis-Jefferson-St. Lawrence area.

=== Transportation ===
Lowville is served by New York State Route 26, New York State Route 812, and New York State Route 12.

== Emergency services ==
Lowville is served by the Lowville Police Department. The village is also home to the Lewis County Sheriffs Department and Corrections Center, as well as a New York State Police barracks.

Lowville is served by the Lowville Volunteer Fire Department. The department responds to 250 calls a year operating three engines, one ladder truck, one rescue truck, one mini pumper, two tankers and a utility pickup.

Lewis County Search and Rescue is a career/volunteer ambulance service with over 2,000 ambulance calls a year serving half of Lewis County.

== Education ==
Lowville Academy and Central School is located in the village, where it provides a K-12 education to approximately 1,500 students. The school was founded on March 21, 1808, by charter of the New York State Board of Regents and is one of the longest continually-operating schools in New York. The school won football Class C titles in 2016 and 2019 and made it to the 2019 basketball state title game before falling 75–74 in overtime.

Lowville is home to a satellite campus of Jefferson Community College. The campus offers college credit and non-college credit courses.

== Notable people ==
- Ela Collins, US congressman
- Renie Cox, skier in the 1960 Winter Olympics
- Charles Dayan, US congressman
- Charles Melville Dewey, painter
- Franklin B. Hough, forester
- Jessie Fremont O'Donnell (1860–1897), writer
- Peter Ostrum, childhood actor and now a veterinarian who resides in Lowville
- Donald Planty, United States Ambassador to Guatemala
- Silas Stow, land agent
- Bradon McDonald, one place away from top 3 on the now canceled Project Runway tv show
