= Lewis County, New York =

County in New York, United States

- County
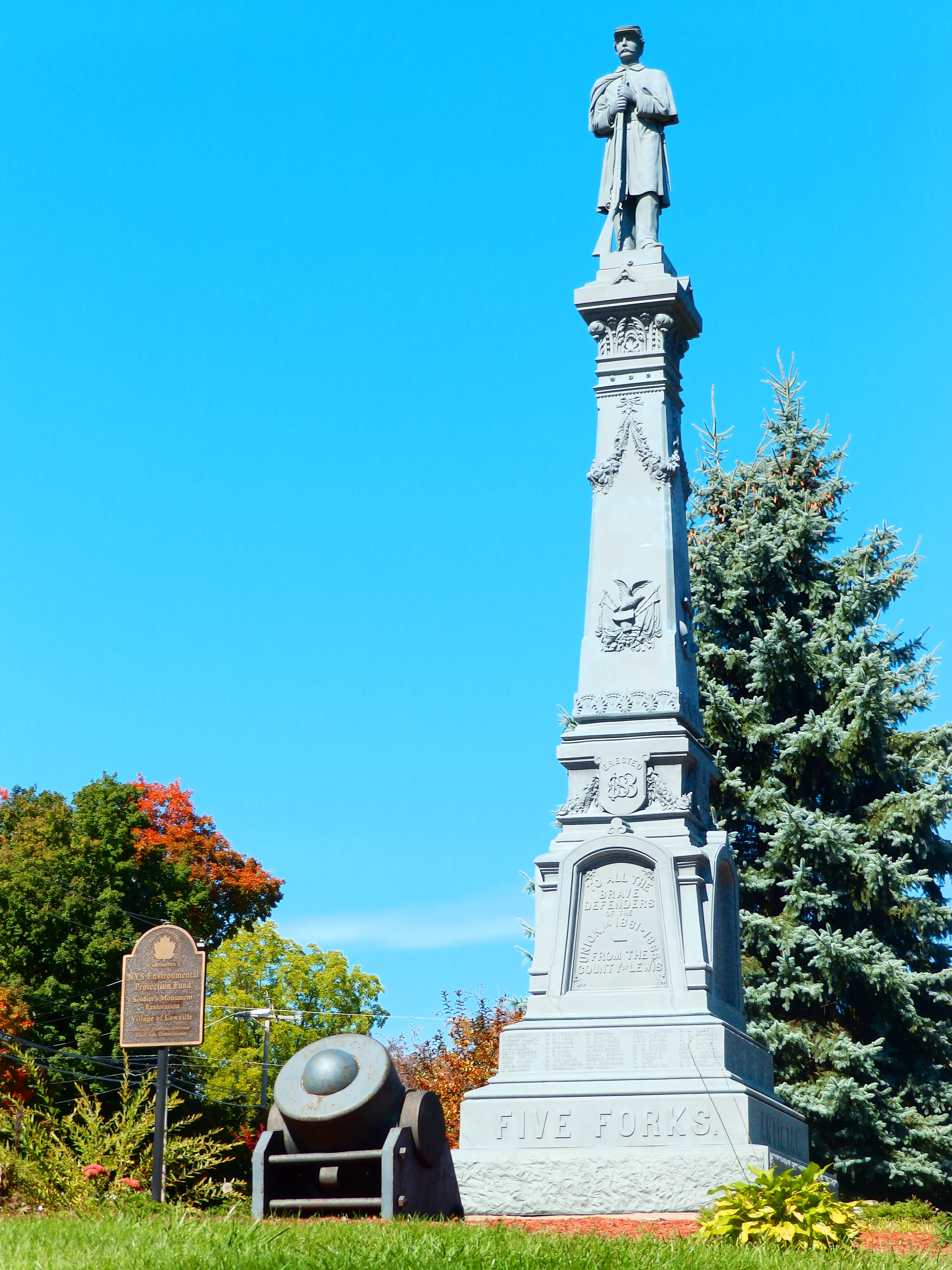
- Lewis County Soldiers' and Sailors' Monument

- Flag Seal

- Location within the U.S. state of New York
- Coordinates: 43°47′N 75°27′W
- Country: United States
- State: New York
- Founded: 1805
- Named for: Morgan Lewis
- Seat: Lowville
- Largest village: Lowville

Area
  - Total: 1,290 sq mi (3,300 km^{2})
  - Land: 1,275 sq mi (3,300 km^{2})
  - Water: 15 sq mi (39 km^{2}) 1.2%

Population (2020)
  - Total: 26,582
  - Estimate (2025): 26,479 ▼
  - Density: 20.8/sq mi (8.0/km^{2})
- Time zone: UTC−5 (Eastern)
  - Summer (DST): UTC−4 (EDT)
- Congressional district: 21st
- Website: lewiscountyny.gov

Lewis County is a county located in the northwestern part of the U.S. state of New York, situated between the Adirondack Mountains and the Tug Hill Plateau, within the state's North Country region. As of the 2020 census, the county had a population of 26,582, making it the fourth-least populous county in New York. Its county seat is Lowville. Named after Morgan Lewis, Governor of New York at the time of its establishment in 1805, Lewis County was formed from part of Oneida County and has undergone multiple jurisdictional changes since the colonial era. The county is part of the North Country region of the state.

The area was originally inhabited by the Iroquois Confederacy before being incorporated into colonial and later state holdings following the American Revolutionary War. Settlement expanded in the late 18th century after Macomb's Purchase, and the county has historical significance related to early militia formations and its role in the War of 1812.

Geographically, the county includes portions of Adirondack Park, the Black River Valley, and is part of New York's Snowbelt, receiving some of the highest snowfall totals in the eastern United States. Its economy is primarily based on agriculture, forestry, and renewable energy, with growing contributions from tourism and winter recreation.

Demographically, the population is predominantly White, with a rural character and low population density. Politically, Lewis County has a long-standing pattern of supporting Republican candidates, with only a few deviations since the Civil War. The county is home to several small towns and villages, including Copenhagen, Croghan, and Lyons Falls, and hosts one of the oldest agricultural fairs in the state, the Lewis County Fair.

== History ==
The area now occupied by Lewis County was very sparsely occupied until the end of the 18th century. Although the land was already claimed by the Province of New York in its original grant, the land was clearly part of the territory of the Iroquois confederacy until after the American Revolutionary War, when New York seized the lands from tribes that had supported the British. The lands were unsurveyed and remained unattractive to settlement until after the complex process of Macomb's Purchase of 1791 eventually put much of the land in the hands of John Brown.

=== Jurisdiction history ===
The area now falling in the jurisdiction of Lewis County, New York, has changed jurisdiction many times, beginning as part of the originally enormous Albany County in 1683, then, after one of the many times that Albany County was divided, becoming part of Tryon County in 1772, which was renamed to Montgomery County in 1784; next, present-day Lewis County was part of Herkimer County in 1791, then part of Oneida County in 1798, and finally assumed its current name and borders in 1805.

When counties were established in New York State in 1683, the present Lewis County was part of Albany County. This was an enormous county, including the northern part of New York State as well as all of the present State of Vermont and, in theory, extending westward to the Pacific Ocean. This county was reduced in size on July 3, 1766, by the creation of Cumberland County, and further on March 16, 1770, by the creation of Gloucester County, both containing territory now in Vermont.

On March 12, 1772, what was left of Albany County was split into three parts, one remaining under the name Albany County. One of the other pieces, Tryon County, contained the western portion (and thus, since no western boundary was specified, theoretically still extended west to the Pacific). The eastern boundary of Tryon County was approximately five miles west of the present city of Schenectady, and the county included the western part of the Adirondack Mountains and the area west of the West Branch of the Delaware River. The area then designated as Tryon County now includes 37 counties of New York State. The county was named for William Tryon, colonial governor of New York.

In the years prior to 1776, most of the Loyalists in Tryon County fled to Canada. In 1784, following the peace treaty that ended the American Revolutionary War, the name of Tryon County was changed to Montgomery County to honor the general, Richard Montgomery, who had captured several places in Canada and died attempting to capture the city of Quebec, replacing the name of the despised British governor.

In 1789, the size of Montgomery County was reduced by the splitting off of Ontario County from Montgomery. The actual area split off from Montgomery County was much larger than the present county, also including the present Allegany, Cattaraugus, Chautauqua, Erie, Genesee, Livingston, Monroe, Niagara, Orleans, Steuben, Wyoming, Yates, and part of Schuyler and Wayne Counties.

In 1791, Herkimer County was one of three counties split off from Montgomery (the other two being Otsego, and Tioga County). This was much larger than the present county, however, and was reduced by a number of subsequent splits. The first one of these, in 1794, produced Onondaga County. This county was larger than the current Onondaga County, including the present Cayuga, Cortland, and part of Oswego Counties.

Oneida County (as well as a part of Chenango County), was split off from Herkimer County in 1798.

Lewis County was split off from Oneida County in 1805.

=== Military history ===
On April 11, 1805, the Militia of Lewis, Jefferson and St Lawrence was established by the Council of Appointment under General Walter Martin. This was known as the 26th Brigade, aka Martin's Brigade.

350 men of the 26th Brigade were detached but never deployed in response to an Act of Congress dated March 30, 1808, in response to the English troubles.

On June 15, 1808, the 1st Regiment was established under Lieutenant Luke Winchell, consisting of troops from Lowville, Denmark, Harrisburg and Pinckney. A cavalry troop was formed in 1809 under Captain Levi Collins.

On April 10, 1812, in anticipation of war, the President of the United States was authorized to call up men for military service. To that end, a company was drafted for three months, under Captain Lyman Deming, of Denmark, in the regiment of Colonel Christopher P. Bellinger, of German Flats. They served at Sackett's Harbor from May 12, 1812, to August 21, 1812, when they were discharged.

When the War of 1812 began on June 12, 1812, the above company was in the field, participating in the First Battle of Sacket's Harbor. To supply them, a company of 72 men were called up on June 23, 1812, under Captain Nathan Cook and placed under Colonel Thomas B Benedict of DeKalb.

County wide drafts were issued in March 1813, September 1813, July 1814 and October 1814 in support of the war effort.

== Geography ==
According to the U.S. Census Bureau, the county has a total area of 1,290 square miles (3,300 km^{2}), of which 1,275 square miles (3,300 km^{2}) is land and 15 square miles (39 km^{2}) (1.2%) is water.

Lewis County is located in northwestern New York State, slightly east of due north from Syracuse. The eastern part of the county is in the Adirondack Park. A good portion of the Tug Hill Plateau is in the western part of the county, putting Lewis County in the heart of the Snowbelt. The county is home to the Black River Valley.

The Snow Belts of the Great Lakes can get enormous snowfalls.

=== Adjacent counties ===
- St. Lawrence County - north
- Herkimer County - east
- Oneida County - south
- Oswego County - west
- Jefferson County - northwest

=== Transportation ===
Major Routes include:

- NY-3
- NY-12
  - NY-12D
- NY-26
- NY-812

== Demographics ==
Historical population
Census	Pop.	Note	%±
1810	6,433		—
1820	9,227		43.4%
1830	15,239		65.2%
1840	17,830		17.0%
1850	24,564		37.8%
1860	28,580		16.3%
1870	28,699		0.4%
1880	31,416		9.5%
1890	29,806		−5.1%
1900	27,427		−8.0%
1910	24,849		−9.4%
1920	23,704		−4.6%
1930	23,447		−1.1%
1940	22,815		−2.7%
1950	22,521		−1.3%
1960	23,249		3.2%
1970	23,644		1.7%
1980	25,035		5.9%
1990	26,796		7.0%
2000	26,944		0.6%
2010	27,087		0.5%
2020	26,582		−1.9%
2025 (est.)	26,479	▼	−0.4%
U.S. Decennial Census; 1790-1960 1900-1990; 1990-2000 2010-2020

|estyear=2023 |estimate=26548 |estref=

=== 2020 census ===
Lewis County, New York – Racial and ethnic composition Note: the US Census treats Hispanic/Latino as an ethnic category. This table excludes Latinos from the racial categories and assigns them to a separate category. Hispanics/Latinos may be of any race.
Race / Ethnicity (NH = Non-Hispanic)	Pop 1980	Pop 1990	Pop 2000	Pop 2010	Pop 2020	% 1980	% 1990	% 2000	% 2010	% 2020
White alone (NH)	24,859	26,403	26,363	26,225	24,942	99.30%	98.53%	97.84%	96.82%	93.83%
Black or African American alone (NH)	14	110	100	170	103	0.06%	0.41%	0.37%	0.63%	0.39%
Native American or Alaska Native alone (NH)	32	61	75	44	40	0.13%	0.23%	0.28%	0.16%	0.15%
Asian alone (NH)	35	88	63	72	65	0.14%	0.33%	0.23%	0.27%	0.24%
Native Hawaiian or Pacific Islander alone (NH)	x	x	12	16	11	x	x	0.04%	0.06%	0.04%
Other race alone (NH)	15	6	15	4	52	0.06%	0.02%	0.06%	0.01%	0.20%
Mixed race or Multiracial (NH)	x	x	144	199	909	x	x	0.53%	0.73%	3.42%
Hispanic or Latino (any race)	80	128	172	357	460	0.32%	0.48%	0.64%	1.32%	1.73%
Total	25,035	26,796	26,944	27,087	26,582	100.00%	100.00%	100.00%	100.00%	100.00%

=== 2000 census ===
As of the census of 2000, there were 26,944 people, 10,040 households, and 7,309 families residing in the county. The population density was 21 inhabitants per square mile (8.1/km^{2}). There were 15,134 housing units at an average density of 12 units per square mile (4.6/km^{2}). The racial makeup of the county was 98.17% White, 0.39% African American, 0.28% Native American, 0.23% Asian, 0.05% Pacific Islander, 0.28% from other races, and 0.59% from two or more races. Hispanic or Latino of any race were 0.64% of the population. 28.8% were of German, 13.8% French, 13.1% Irish, 9.2% English, 6.5% American and 5.3% Polish ancestry according to Census 2000. 97.3% spoke English and 1.0% Spanish as their first language.

There were 10,040 households, out of which 35.30% had children under the age of 18 living with them, 59.40% were married couples living together, 8.40% had a female householder with no husband present, and 27.20% were non-families. 22.60% of all households were made up of individuals, and 10.80% had someone living alone who was 65 years of age or older. The average household size was 2.66 and the average family size was 3.12.

In the county, the population was spread out, with 27.80% under the age of 18, 7.70% from 18 to 24, 28.20% from 25 to 44, 22.50% from 45 to 64, and 13.80% who were 65 years of age or older. The median age was 37 years. For every 100 females there were 98.60 males. For every 100 females age 18 and over, there were 97.60 males.

The median income for a household in the county was $34,361, and the median income for a family was $39,287. Males had a median income of $30,479 versus $21,115 for females. The per capita income for the county was $14,971. About 10.10% of families and 13.20% of the population were below the poverty line, including 16.40% of those under age 18 and 14.00% of those age 65 or over.

== Communities ==
=== Larger Settlements ===
#	Location	Population	Type	Sector
1	†Lowville	3,470	Village	Center
2	Copenhagen	841	Village	Northwest
3	Port Leyden	672	Village	Southeast
4	††Harrisville	628	CDP	North
5	Croghan	618	Village	East
6	Lyons Falls	566	Village	Southeast
7	Castorland	351	Village	Northwest
8	Constableville	242	Village	Southwest
9	Turin	232	Village	Southeast

† - County Seat

†† - Former Village

=== Towns ===
- Croghan
- Denmark
- Diana
- Greig
- Harrisburg
- Lewis
- Leyden
- Lowville
- Lyonsdale
- Martinsburg
- Montague
- New Bremen
- Osceola
- Pinckney
- Turin
- Watson
- West Turin

=== Hamlets ===
- Beaver Falls
- Talcottville
- List of other hamlets

== Notable people ==
Child actor and veterinarian Peter Ostrum (born November 1957) settled in Lowville, Lewis County to practice veterinary medicine.

Judge Fred A. Young (August 27, 1904 – October 16, 1973) was a prominent Republican politician, lawyer, state legislator, and state judge, who was born in, and lived most of his life in, Lowville.

Florence Augusta Merriam Bailey (August 8, 1863 – September 22, 1948) was an American ornithologist and nature writer. She was born in Locust Grove, New York.

Franklin B. Hough (July 20, 1822 – June 11, 1885) was a scientist, historian and the first chief of the United States Division of Forestry, the predecessor of the United States Forest Service. He was born in Martinsburg and retired in Lowville.

Clinton Hart Merriam (December 5, 1855 – March 19, 1942) was an American zoologist, ornithologist, entomologist, ethnographer, and naturalist.

Edward McGlachlin (December 19. 1840 - April 22, 1931) was an American newspaper editor and politician. McGlachlin was born in Watson.

== Politics ==
United States presidential election results for Lewis County, New York
Year	Republican		Democratic		Third party(ies)	
Year	No.	%	No.	%	No.	%
1884	3,854	49.66%	3,778	48.69%	128	1.65%
1888	4,369	52.33%	3,807	45.60%	173	2.07%
1892	3,965	51.76%	3,369	43.98%	327	4.27%
1896	4,461	58.34%	3,042	39.78%	144	1.88%
1900	4,308	59.32%	2,857	39.34%	97	1.34%
1904	4,242	58.53%	2,842	39.21%	164	2.26%
1908	4,159	58.13%	2,810	39.27%	186	2.60%
1912	2,064	33.87%	2,339	38.39%	1,690	27.74%
1916	3,418	54.90%	2,675	42.96%	133	2.14%
1920	5,906	67.95%	2,673	30.75%	113	1.30%
1924	6,066	66.98%	2,801	30.93%	190	2.10%
1928	7,175	63.25%	4,161	36.68%	8	0.07%
1932	6,258	60.03%	4,086	39.20%	80	0.77%
1936	8,048	70.44%	3,263	28.56%	115	1.01%
1940	8,049	69.80%	3,466	30.06%	17	0.15%
1944	6,256	64.40%	3,441	35.42%	18	0.19%
1948	5,692	62.70%	3,211	35.37%	175	1.93%
1952	7,622	72.14%	2,927	27.70%	17	0.16%
1956	7,764	75.38%	2,536	24.62%	0	0.00%
1960	6,632	62.00%	4,056	37.92%	9	0.08%
1964	3,185	32.57%	6,584	67.33%	10	0.10%
1968	5,524	60.17%	3,205	34.91%	451	4.91%
1972	6,591	68.60%	2,987	31.09%	30	0.31%
1976	5,840	60.62%	3,764	39.07%	29	0.30%
1980	4,937	50.26%	3,973	40.45%	912	9.29%
1984	7,069	71.69%	2,757	27.96%	34	0.34%
1988	5,787	57.08%	4,252	41.94%	99	0.98%
1992	4,101	37.17%	3,676	33.32%	3,255	29.51%
1996	3,965	38.93%	4,402	43.22%	1,818	17.85%
2000	6,103	55.83%	4,333	39.64%	496	4.54%
2004	6,624	58.12%	4,546	39.89%	227	1.99%
2008	5,969	53.59%	4,986	44.77%	183	1.64%
2012	5,651	53.71%	4,724	44.90%	147	1.40%
2016	7,400	65.34%	3,146	27.78%	779	6.88%
2020	8,890	68.57%	3,823	29.49%	251	1.94%
2024	9,353	71.77%	3,600	27.62%	79	0.61%

Lewis County is strongly Republican having been won by Republican presidential candidates all but three times since the Civil War, with the only exceptions being in 1912, 1964, and 1996, and the only time the Democratic candidate received a majority of the vote was in 1964. President Donald Trump received over two-thirds of the vote in 2020 and 71.8% of the vote in 2024, the largest share of the vote since 1956.

== Education ==
School districts include:

- Adirondack Central School District
- Beaver River Central School District
- Camden Central School District
- Carthage Central School District
- Copenhagen Central School District
- Harrisville Central School District
- Lowville Academy and Central School District
- Sandy Creek Central School District
- South Jefferson Central School District
- South Lewis Central School District

== See also ==
- List of counties in New York
- National Register of Historic Places listings in Lewis County, New York
- Castorland Company

== Bibliography ==
- Hough, Franklin B. 1822-1885 A history of Lewis County, in the State of New York, from the beginning of its settlement to the present time. Merrick, New York :Richwood Publishing Company.
