= Asa Fitch (politician) =

American politician (1765–1843)

Member of the U.S. House of Representatives from New York's 6th district
- In office March 4, 1811 – March 4, 1813
- Preceded by: Herman Knickerbocker
- Succeeded by: Jonathan Fisk

Personal details
- Born: November 10, 1765 Groton, Connecticut Colony, British America
- Died: August 24, 1843 (aged 77) Salem, New York, U.S.
- Resting place: Evergreen Cemetery, Salem
- Party: Federalist
- Spouse: Abigail Martin (m. 1791; died 1839)
- Children: Martin Fitch^{(b. 1793; died 1816)}; Mary (McFarland)^{(b. 1795; died 1872)}; Almira (Martin)^{(b. 1798; died 1875)}; Barbara Fitch^{(b. 1800; died 1803)}; Barbara Jarvis (Dunlap)^{(b. 1804; died 1857)}; Asa Fitch Jr.^{(b. 1809; died 1879)}; Abigail Martin (Mack)^{(b. 1811; died 1888)}; James Harvey Fitch^{(b. 1814; died 1902)}
- Relatives: Adam Martin (father-in-law); Walter Martin (brother-in-law); Morgan Lewis Martin (nephew); James Duane Doty (nephew)
- Profession: Physician

Military service
- Allegiance: United States
- Branch/service: Continental Army
- Rank: Sergeant
- Battles/wars: American Revolutionary War

Asa Fitch Sr. (November 10, 1765 – August 24, 1843) was an American medical doctor, politician, and New York pioneer. He was a member of the U.S. House of Representatives, representing New York's 6th congressional district during the 12th U.S. Congress (1811–1813). He also served as a county judge in Washington County, New York, and was president of the Washington County Medical Society.

His son, Asa Fitch Jr., was a notable entomologist and historian.

== Biography ==
He was born in Groton in the Connecticut Colony. He studied medicine and became a medical doctor practicing in Duanesburg and Salem, New York.

During the Revolutionary War he served as a sergeant in Captain Livingston's company. He was a justice of the peace from 1799 to 1810, was President of the Washington County Medical Society from 1806 to 1826, and was a County judge from 1810 to 1821.

He was elected as a Federalist to the Twelfth United States Congress, holding office from March 4, 1811, to March 3, 1813. He declined to be a candidate for renomination in 1812 and resumed the practice of medicine.

He died in Salem, New York, on August 24, 1843, and is interred in Evergreen Cemetery.

== Personal life and family ==
Asa Fitch Sr. was the ninth of at least ten children born to Pelatiah Fitch (1722–1803) and his wife Elizabeth (née Burrows; 1725–1795). Pelatiah Fitch was a physician and surveyor, and a local commissioner of safety in the Salem area during the American Revolution. Two of Asa's brothers also served in the Revolution.

Asa Fitch was a descendant of the notable American colonist Reverend James Fitch, who emigrated to the Connecticut Colony in 1638 with his mother and four brothers; James Fitch later became one of the founders of Norwich, Connecticut, and an important envoy to the Mohegan people during his era.

Asa Fitch Sr. married Abigail Martin on January 27, 1791. Abigail was a daughter of Adam Martin, a Revolutionary War soldier and one of the founders of Martinsburg, New York. They had at least eight children together, though one died in childhood.

U.S. House of Representatives
Preceded by Herman Knickerbocker, Robert Le Roy Livingston	Member of the U.S. House of Representatives from New York's 6th congressional district 1811–1813 with Robert Le Roy Livingston and Thomas P. Grosvenor	Succeeded by Jonathan Fisk
