= Walter Martin =

Walter Martin may refer to:

- Walter Martin (general) (1764–1834), founder of Martinsburg, New York
  - Gen. Walter Martin House, a historic home located at Martinsburg in Lewis County, New York
- Walter Ralston Martin (1928–1989), American Evangelical minister, author, and Christian apologist
- Walter Martin (musician), American singer-songwriter and member of The Walkmen
- Walter Martin (rugby union) (1883–1933), Wales international rugby union player
- Walter Martin (American cyclist) (1891–1966) (aka Walden Martin), American road racing cyclist
- Walter Martin (Italian cyclist) (1936–2020)
- Walter Martin, half of artists Martin & Muñoz
- Walter Stillman Martin, Christian minister and husband of Civilla D. Martin

== See also ==
- Walt Martin, American production sound mixer
