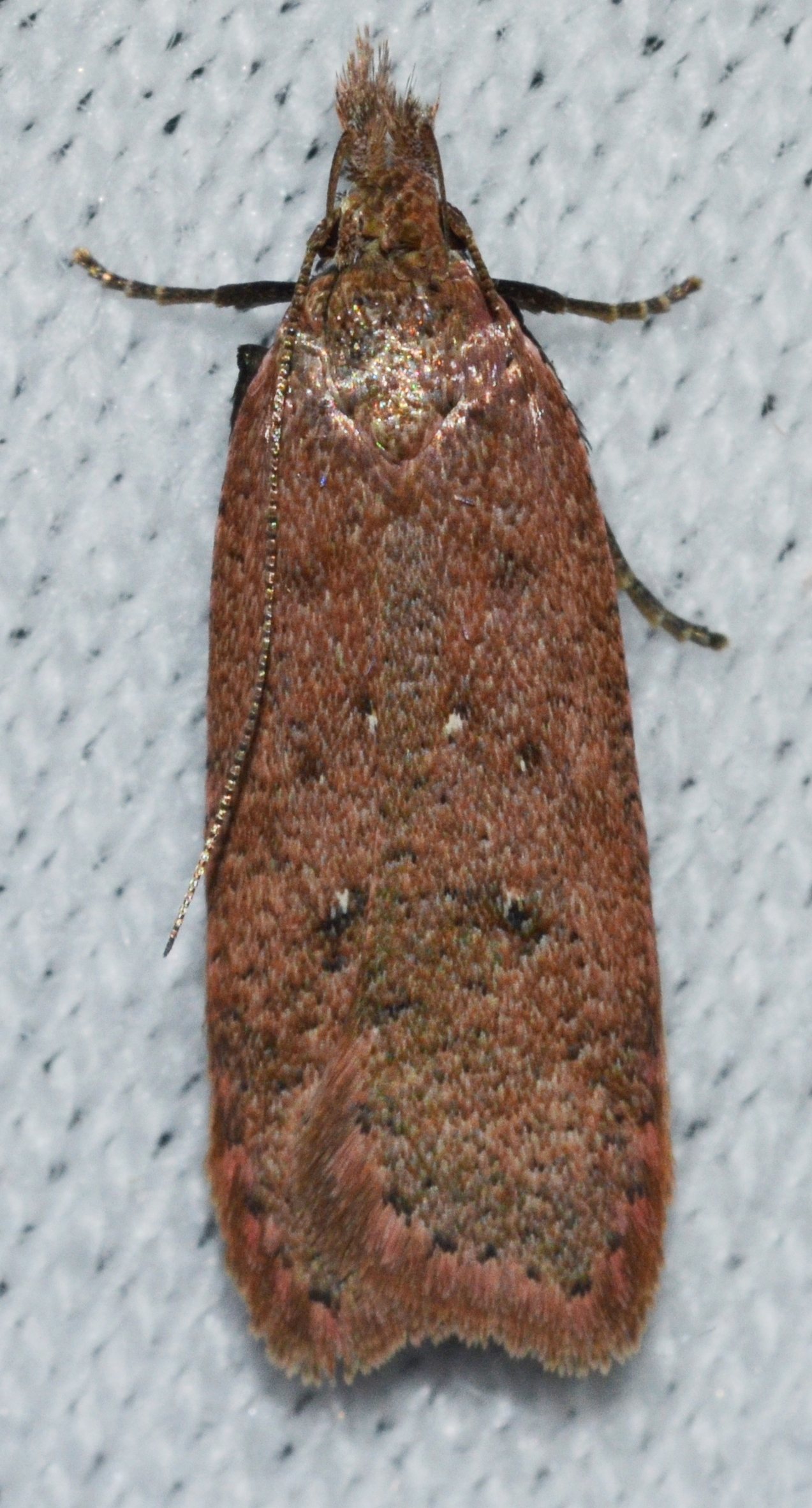

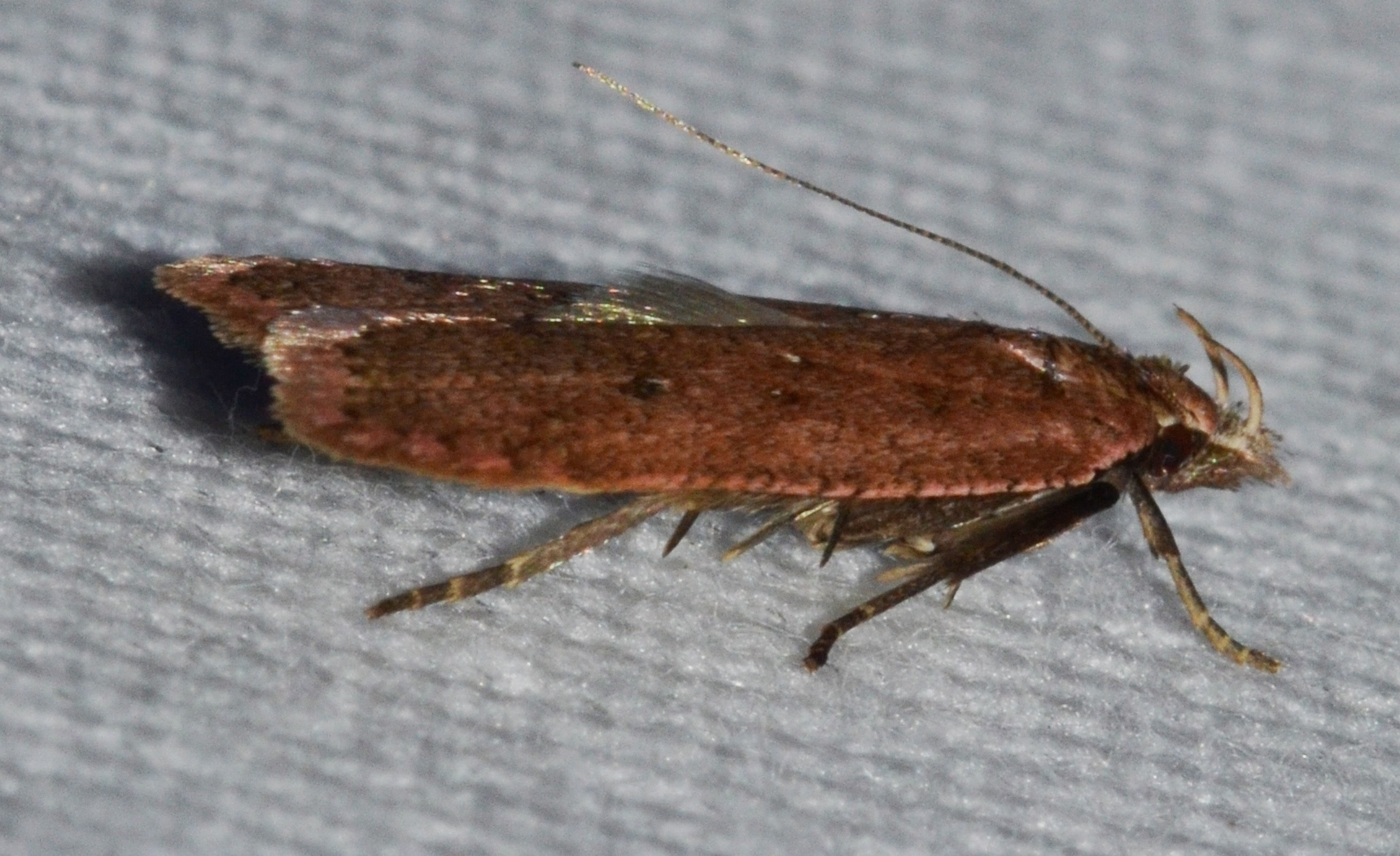

Scientific classification
- Domain: Eukaryota
- Kingdom: Animalia
- Phylum: Arthropoda
- Class: Insecta
- Order: Lepidoptera
- Family: Gelechiidae
- Genus: Dichomeris
- Species: D. ventrella

Binomial name
- Dichomeris ventrella (Fitch, 1854)

Synonyms
- Chaetochilus ventrellus Fitch, 1854; Ypsolophus unicipunctellus Clemens, 1863; Ypsolophus querciella Chambers, 1872; Ypsolophus roseocostellus Walsingham, 1882; Nothris trinotella Coquillett, 1883; Dichomeris ventrellus

= Dichomeris ventrella =

Species of moth

Dichomeris ventrella is a moth of the family Gelechiidae. It was described by Asa Fitch in 1854. It is found in North America, where it has been recorded from Maine to Florida, west to Texas, Oklahoma, Kansas, Wisconsin and southern Arizona.

The wingspan is about 17 mm. The forewings are pale cinereous with a faint reddish tinge. The hindwings are shining pale grayish.

The larvae feed on Castanea dentata, Betula, Carpinus, Corylus, Carya and Quercus species. They roll the leaves of their host plant.
