= Adam Martin (politician) =

American politician (1739-1818)

Member of the New York State Assembly from the Washington County district
- In office July 1, 1786 – June 30, 1787 Serving with Ichabod Parker, Edward Savage, & Peter B. Tierce

Personal details
- Born: August 27, 1739 Sturbridge, Massachusetts, U.S.
- Died: August 9, 1818 (aged 78) Martinsburg, New York, U.S.
- Resting place: Martinsburg Cemetery, Martinsburg
- Spouse: Abigail Cheney (m. 1762–1818)
- Children: Zuriah Sophia (Conkey)^{(b. 1763; died 1849)}; Walter Martin^{(b. 1764; died 1834)}; Sarah (Doty)^{(b. 1767; died 1843)}; Abigail (Fitch)^{(b. 1772; died 1839)}; Elizabeth (Freeman)^{(b. 1774; died 1844)}; Mary Martin^{(b. 1777; died 1794)}
- Relatives: Asa Fitch Sr. (son-in-law); Asa Fitch Jr. (grandson); Morgan Lewis Martin (grandson); James Duane Doty (grandson)

Military service
- Allegiance: United States
- Branch/service: Massachusetts Militia; Continental Army; New York Militia
- Years of service: 1750s, 1770s (MA); 1775–1779 (Continentals); 1780s, 1790s (NY)
- Rank: Captain (MA); Colonel (NY)
- Unit: 15th Mass. Regiment; 3rd Reg. Worcester Co. Militia
- Battles/wars: French and Indian War; American Revolutionary War

Adam Martin (August 27, 1739 – August 9, 1818) was an American merchant, politician, and New York pioneer. With his son, Walter Martin, he was one of the founders of Martinsburg, New York. Before settling Martinsburg, he served in the New York State Assembly in the 1786–1787 term, representing Washington County. Earlier in life, he served as an officer in the American provincial militia during the French and Indian War, and served as a captain in the 15th Massachusetts Regiment during the American Revolutionary War.

His grandchildren include two founding fathers of the state of Wisconsin—Morgan Lewis Martin and James Duane Doty—as well as the notable entomologist and historian Asa Fitch.

== Biography ==
Adam Martin was born in Sturbridge, Massachusetts, in 1739. His father was a pioneer in the use of water power for manufacturing in New England; on his father's untimely death in 1751, Martin inherited his father's collection of lands and sawmills. In his later enlistment papers, Martin is described as a ward of James Denison after the death of his father.

In 1756, Martin was enlisted or impressed into the Massachusetts provincial militia to serve in the French and Indian War. He served a year in the regiment commanded by Colonel Timothy Ruggles, campaigning in New York state, then later was re-enlisted in the regiment of John Chandler for participating in the invasion of Canada. During his later service, he was accompanied by his younger brother, Aaron. He mustered out of service in 1762 with the rank of sergeant.

After the war, Martin owned a farm in Sturbridge, and was active as an officer of the local militia.

In the crises preceding the official outbreak of the American Revolutionary War, Martin was 1st lieutenant of the local minuteman militia company, part of Colonel Warner's regiment; Martin and his company were active in the defense of the Siege of Boston in 1775 and 1776. Soon after, Martin became captain of a company serving in the 15th Massachusetts Regiment, commanded by Timothy Bigelow. He participated in the Saratoga campaign, and remained in the Continental Army until 1779, when he resigned and returned to militia service. He served in the Worcester County militia regiment commanded by Nathan Tyler, and was assigned to the defense of Rhode Island until at least 1780.

After the war, Martin moved to a farm in Salem, New York, where his brother Moses had previously become established. With his son, Walter, Adam Martin began investing in water powered mills in the Salem area. They also built a large dwelling house which they operated as a tavern and store.

While living in Salem, Martin was elected to the New York State Assembly, as one of four representatives of Washington County for the 10th New York State Legislature (1786–1787).

In 1795, Martin and his son sold off most of their property in Salem to Martin's son-in-law Dr. Asa Fitch. Martin's son, Walter, used their profits to begin purchasing land in what was then Oneida County, New York. Walter Martin began soliciting family and friends to relocate to the area in 1801, and Adam Martin followed his son to that place in 1803. The settlement came to be named Martinsburg, named for their family. In Martrinsburg, Martin was also associated with the New York militia. Martin resided there for the rest of his life, and died there on August 9, 1818.

== Personal life and family ==
Adam Martin was the eldest son and third of at least seven children born to Aaron Martin (1711–1751) and his wife Sarah (née Newell; 1716–1791). Aaron Martin was a pioneer in the use of water-powered mills in New England, and invested in riverfront property, building several mills around the region; he died of an accidental drowning in the Quinebaug River while inspecting one of his mills. Adam Martin's younger brothers, Aaron and Moses, also served in the American Revolutionary War.

The Martin family were descended from the colonist Thomas Martin Sr., who emigrated from England to the Massachusetts Bay Colony in the mid-1600s. The Newell family were descended from the colonist Isaac Newell, who also arrived in Massachusetts in the mid-1600s.

Adam Martin married Abigail Cheney on December 19, 1762. Abigail was also a member of a prominent early New England family, being a descendant of the colonist William Cheney (1604–1667), who settled in the Massachusetts Bay Colony in the 1630s. Adam and Abigail had at least six children together.

Their only son was Walter Martin, who initiated the purchase of land to establish Martinsburg and instigated the family's move to that place. Martin also served in the New York State Senate. Walter Martin's son Morgan Lewis Martin went west and became instrumental in the establishment of the state of Wisconsin.

Their daughter Sarah married Chillus Doty and was the mother of James Duane Doty, who went on to become governor of the Wisconsin Territory and later governor of the Utah Territory.

Another daughter, Abigail, married Asa Fitch, a medical doctor and U.S. representative in the 12th Congress (1811–1813). Their child, Asa Fitch Jr., became a notable entomologist and historian.
