= David Irvin =

19th century American judge

Justice of the Supreme Court of the Wisconsin Territory
- In office April 20, 1836 – May 29, 1848
- Appointed by: Andrew Jackson
- Preceded by: Position established
- Succeeded by: Position abolished

United States District Judge for the Western District of the Michigan Territory
- In office February 1, 1832 – April 20, 1836
- Appointed by: Andrew Jackson
- Preceded by: James Duane Doty
- Succeeded by: Position abolished

Personal details
- Born: c.1798 (Note: Some sources say he was born "about 1794" but his grave stone says 1798 and other documents suggest 1798 or a year very close to 1798.) Albemarle County, Virginia, U.S.
- Died: March 23, 1872 (aged 73–74) Texas, U.S.
- Resting place: Evergreen Cemetery, Victoria, Texas
- Spouse: none
- Relatives: William W. Irvin (brother)

David Irvin (c.1798 – March 23, 1872) was an American lawyer, jurist, and pioneer of Wisconsin, Iowa, and Texas. He served as a justice of the Supreme Court of the Wisconsin Territory for the entire existence of that court, from 1836 to 1848. Before that appointment, he served as a federal judge in the Michigan Territory from 1832 to 1836, having jurisdiction over the part of the territory west of Lake Michigan, including what is now Wisconsin, Iowa, and Minnesota.

== Biography ==
David Irvin was born in Albemarle County, Virginia, about 1798. He was raised and educated in Albemarle County; he studied law and was admitted to the bar there in 1820. He subsequently moved to practice law in the Shenandoah Valley.

Irvin was described by historical documents as a close friend of William Cabell Rives, who during these years became a member of Congress and U.S. senator. After several years without much success as a lawyer, Irvin secured an appointment as a federal judge in the Michigan Territory, and historical sources credit Rives for influencing this appointment. Irvin's elder brother, William W. Irvin, was also a U.S. representative in this era and may also have had influence in his appointment.

He was appointed by President Andrew Jackson to serve a four year term, beginning February 1, 1832, to succeed James Duane Doty. His district covered all of the Michigan Territory west of Lake Michigan. He was not particularly interested in court business and spent no more time in the Michigan Territory than was required for him to complete his responsibilities, normally residing in Virginia or St. Louis. In about 1834, an effort was made by territory residents to have his judicial seat declared vacant due to his frequent absences, and to have a resident of the territory appointed in his place; President Jackson refused the effort and allowed Irvin to remain in office.

In 1836, the Wisconsin Territory was created from the western half of the Michigan Territory, and the organizing act of the Wisconsin Territory established a Supreme Court for the territory. President Jackson appointed Irvin to one of the three seats on the Wisconsin Territory Supreme Court. He served continuously on the Wisconsin Territory Supreme Court for its entire existence, from 1836 to 1848. In the early years of the Wisconsin Territory, his judicial district comprised all of the area of the Wisconsin Territory west of the Mississippi River. That land was removed from the Wisconsin Territory with the establishment of the Iowa Territory in 1838; after that time, his district shifted to territory in the south-central part of what is now the state of Wisconsin. Wisconsin state bar biographers noted that he was not a particularly skilled lawyer, did not possess vast legal knowledge, and had little interest in reading books or studying current events. Irvin's court decisions were usually attributed more to common sense than following the law. He said his horse, Pedro, had more common sense than the lawyers in his courtroom. He would often adjourn court to shoot prairie chickens.

While serving in the Wisconsin Territory, in 1841, he was also elected to the American Philosophical Society.

When his office in the Territory government ceased to exist, in 1848, Irvin left Wisconsin and moved to the new state of Texas. He invested in a large cotton plantation on the Guadalupe River near Galveston. Reportedly, as a Texas resident, Irvin supported the Confederacy during the American Civil War.

After the defeat of the Confederacy in the Civil War, Irvin lost most of his property. He died in Texas on March 23, 1872.

== Personal life and family ==
David Irvin was the youngest of ten children born to Reverend William Irvin and his wife Elizabeth (née Holt). William Irvin was one of the earliest Presbyterian ministers in Albemarle County, Virginia.

David's elder brother William W. Irvin moved to Ohio in the early 1800s where he served on the Supreme Court of Ohio; he later represented Ohio for two terms in the U.S. House of Representatives.

David Irvin never married. His closest companions were said to be his horse, Pedro, and dog, York, who were depicted with him in his official portrait.

== Notes ==
Legal offices
Preceded by James Duane Doty	United States District Judge for the Western District of the Michigan Territory; 1832–1836	Territory abolished
Territory established	Justice of the Supreme Court of the Wisconsin Territory; 1836–1848	Territory abolished
