= Robert Le Roy Livingston =

American politician

Member of the U.S. House of Representatives from New York's 6th district
- In office March 4, 1809 – May 6, 1812
- Preceded by: Daniel C. Verplanck
- Succeeded by: Asa Fitch; Thomas P. Grosvenor

Personal details
- Born: October 10, 1778
- Died: April 14, 1836 (aged 57)
- Party: Federalist
- Spouse: Anna Maria Digges
- Children: 7
- Parent(s): John Livingston; Mary Ann LeRoy
- Relatives: Robert Livingston (grandfather)
- Education: College of New Jersey

Robert Le Roy Livingston (October 10, 1778 – April 14, 1836) was a United States representative from New York.

== Early life ==
Robert Le Roy Livingston was born on October 10, 1778 in Claverack, Columbia County to John Livingston (1749–1822) and Mary Ann Le Roy (1759–1797), daughter of Jacob Le Roy and Cornelia Rutgers,. After his mother's death in 1797, his father married Catherine (Livingston) Ridley, his first cousin, the daughter of William Livingston and the widow of Matthew Ridley. His siblings included: Cornelia Livingston (b. 1776), who married Nicholas G. Rutgers, Jacob Livingston (b. 1780) who first married Catherine Adriana de Peyster (granddaughter of Abraham de Peyster), and second married Levantia White, John G. Livingston (b. 1782), who died unmarried after being killed in a duel, Daniel Livingston (b. 1786) who married Eliza Oothout, Philip Henry Livingston (b. 1787), Anthony Rutgers Livingston (b. 1789), who married Anna Hoffman (daughter of Martin Hoffman and Beulah Murray), Henry Livingston (b. 1791), who married Ann Eliza Van Ness, and Herman Livingston (1793–1872), who married Sarah Lawrence Hallett (1795–1868) and inherited the family home from their father, John Livingston.

His parents were of Scottish and French Huguenot descent, whose families had been in the New York colony for generations. His paternal grandfather was Robert Livingston (1708–1790), the third and final Lord of Livingston Manor and a member of the assembly for the manor from 1737 to 1790.

Livingston attended private school and graduated from College of New Jersey.

== Career ==
He was commissioned a first lieutenant in the Twelfth United States Infantry on January 14, 1799 and honorably discharged on June 15, 1800. He was elected as a Federalist from New York to the Eleventh and Twelfth United States Congresses, serving from March 4, 1809 until May 6, 1812, when he resigned.

When the War of 1812 started, Livingston was commissioned lieutenant colonel of the Twenty-third Infantry on May 29, 1812 and served until February 1, 1813, when he resigned.

== Personal life ==
He was married to Anna Maria Digges (1792–1865), daughter of George Digges (1742–1792) and Catherine Brent (1768–1835). Together, they had seven children:

- Robert L. Livingston (b. 1812), who died unmarried
- Eliza C. Livingston (1814–1888), who married Andrew Pierce
- Cornelia Livingston, who married Abraham Pierce
- John L. Livingston (1816–1849), who married Margaret Lockwood
- William Le Roy Livingston
- George Digges Livingston (1822-1877) who married Anne C. Sweeney daughter of Mary Symes Chichester Hooe and George Sweeney.
- Edward Livingston (1824–1872), who married Caroline Ann Van Rensselaer (1823–1896), daughter of Robert Hendrick Van Rensselaer (1779–1835) and Anna Ten Broeck (1783–1861)
- Norah Carroll Livingston (1830–1896), who married Ignatius Fenwick Young (1825–1892)

Livingston died in 1836.

U.S. House of Representatives
Preceded by Daniel C. Verplanck	Member of the U.S. House of Representatives from New York's 6th congressional district 1809 - 1812 with Herman Knickerbocker and Asa Fitch	Succeeded by Asa Fitch, Thomas P. Grosvenor
