= Methodist Episcopal Church of West Martinsburg =

Historic church in New York, United States

- U.S. National Register of Historic Places
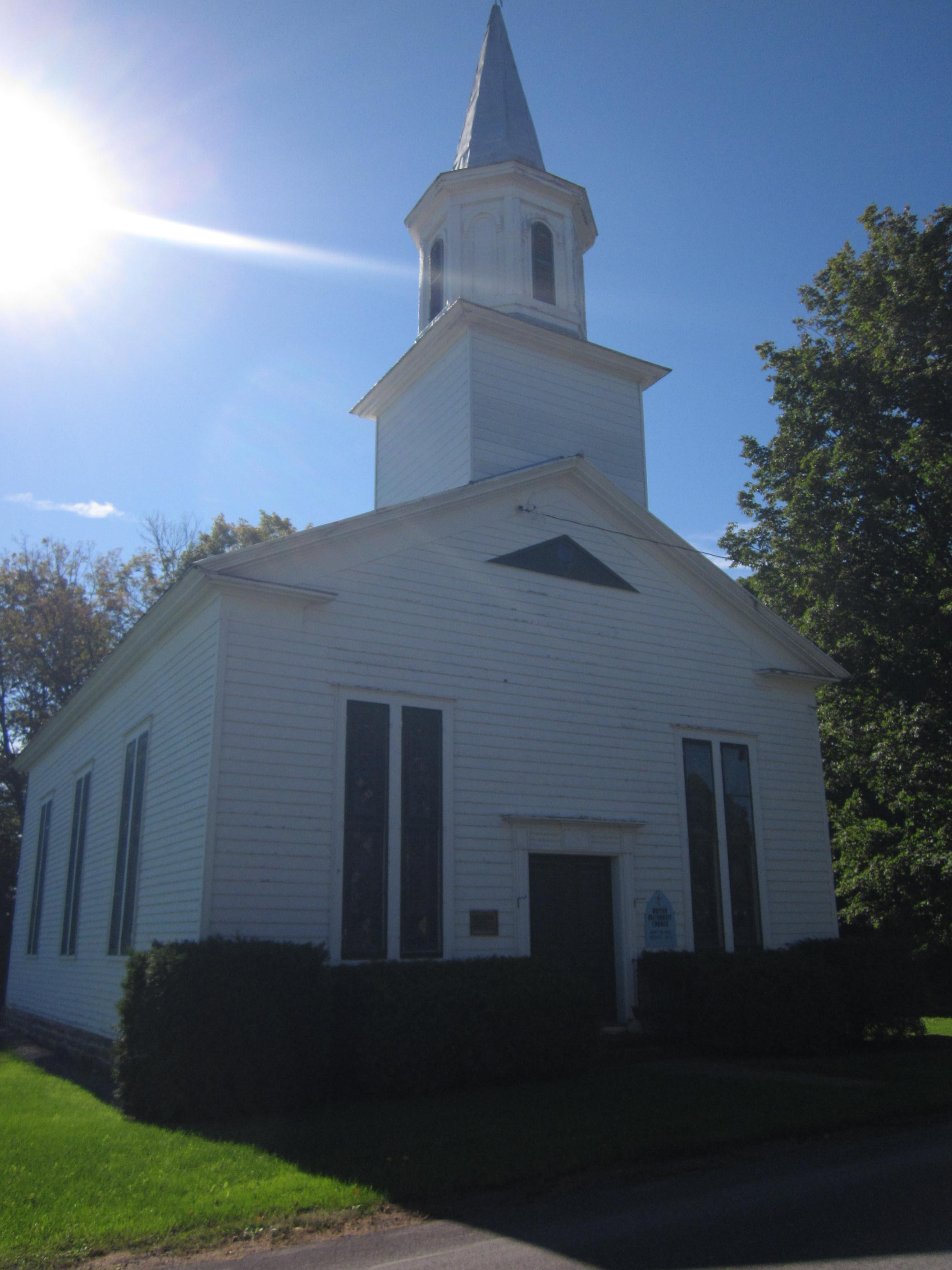
- Methodist Episcopal Church of West Martinsburg, September 2011

- Location within New York Location within the United States
- Location: W. Martinsburg Rd., West Martinsburg, New York
- Coordinates: 43°45′35″N 75°31′0″W
- Area: 0.2 acres (0.081 ha)
- Built: 1840
- Architectural style: Federal
- NRHP reference No.: 83001704
- Added to NRHP: September 15, 1983

Methodist Episcopal Church of West Martinsburg, also known as West Martinsburg Methodist Church, is a historic Methodist Episcopal church located at West Martinsburg in Lewis County, New York. It dates to about 1840 and is of frame construction with clapboard siding. It is rectangular in plan with a simple gable roof. It features a two-stage bell tower surmounted by a steeple.

It was listed on the National Register of Historic Places in 1983.
