= Asa Fitch =

American entomologist (1809–1879)

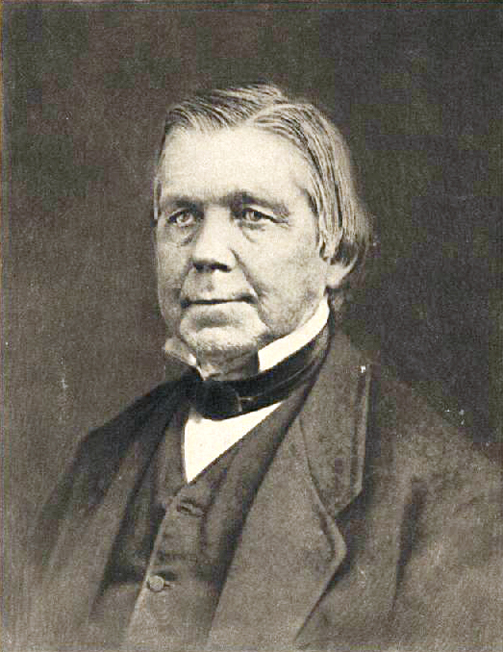
- Born: February 24, 1809; Salem, New York
- Died: April 8, 1879 (aged 70); Salem, New York
- Education: Rensselaer Polytechnic Institute
- Father: Asa Fitch Sr.
- Relatives: Adam Martin (grandfather); Walter Martin (uncle); Morgan Lewis Martin (cousin); James Duane Doty (cousin)
- Scientific career
- Fields: Entomology
- Workplaces: New York State Agricultural Society

Asa Fitch Jr. (February 24, 1809 – April 8, 1879) was an American natural historian and entomologist from Salem, New York.

== Biography ==
Asa Fitch was born at Fitch's Point, Salem, New York on February 24, 1809. His early studies were of both natural history and medicine, which he studied at the newly formed Rensselaer Polytechnic Institute, graduating in 1827. However, in 1838 he decided to start studying agriculture and entomology. In 1838 he began to collect and study insects for New York state. In 1854 he became the first professional entomologist of New York State Agricultural Society (commissioned by the State of New York). This made him the first occupational entomologist in the United States.

His vast studies of many insects helped scientists to solve some of the problems of crop damage caused by insects. Many of his notebooks are now the property of the Smithsonian Institution. Fitch also discovered the rodent botfly Cuterebra emasculator in 1856. He died April 8, 1879, at his home in Salem, New York.

The Martin–Fitch House and Asa Fitch Jr. Laboratory was added to the National Register of Historic Places in 2014.

== Personal life and family ==
Asa Fitch Jr. was the sixth of at least eight children born to Asa Fitch Sr. (1765–1843) and his wife Abigail (née Martin; 1772–1839). Asa Fitch Sr. was a physician and politician, and served as a U.S. representative from New York for the 12th Congress. Abigail Martin was a daughter of Adam Martin and sister of Walter Martin—the founders of Martinsburg, New York.

Through his paternal lineage, Asa Fitch Jr. was a descendant of the notable American colonist Reverend James Fitch, who emigrated to the Connecticut Colony in 1638 with his mother and four brothers; James Fitch later became one of the founders of Norwich, Connecticut, and an important envoy to the Mohegan people during his era.

Through his mother's siblings, Fitch was a first cousin to Wisconsin founding fathers Morgan Lewis Martin and James Duane Doty. His mother's family were descendants of the colonist Thomas Martin Sr., who emigrated from England to the Massachusetts Bay Colony in the mid-1600s.
