= Thomas P. Grosvenor =

American politician

Member of the U.S. House of Representatives from New York
- In office January 29, 1813 – March 3, 1817
- Preceded by: Robert Le Roy Livingston
- Succeeded by: Philip J. Schuyler
- Constituency: 6th district (1813); 5th district (1813–17)

Member of the New York State Assembly from Columbia County
- In office July 1, 1810 – June 30, 1812

Personal details
- Born: Thomas Peabody Grosvenor; December 20, 1778 Pomfret, Connecticut
- Died: April 24, 1817 (aged 38) Waterloo, Maryland
- Party: Federalist
- Spouse: Mary Jane Hanson
- Parent: Seth Grosvenor (1748 - 1808)
- Relatives: Alexander Contee Hanson (brother-in-law)
- Education: Yale College
- Profession: Lawyer

Thomas Peabody Grosvenor (December 20, 1778 – April 24, 1817) was a United States representative from New York.

== Early life ==
Thomas Peabody Grosvenor was born on December 20, 1778, in Pomfret, Connecticut. He was the son of Seth Grosvenor (1748–1808) and the grandson of John Grosvenor (1711–1804) and Hannah Dresser (1711–1782). He pursued classical studies and graduated from Yale College in 1800, where he was President of the Society of Brothers in Unity. He studied law, was admitted to the bar and commenced practice in Hudson, New York.

== Career ==
In 1799, he wrote to then Maj. Gen. Alexander Hamilton, recommending Mr. Joseph Hickcox to fill in the vacancy in the 13th Regiment of the Army of the United States caused by the vacancy in the line due to James Gordon's new role as Office of the Quarter Master.

He was a member of the New York State Assembly from 1810 to 1812, and was District Attorney of the Third District (comprising Columbia, Greene and Rensselaer counties) from 1810 to 1811.

Grosvenor was elected as a Federalist to the 12th United States Congress to fill the vacancy caused by the resignation of Robert Le Roy Livingston, and was re-elected to the 13th and 14th United States Congresses, serving from January 29, 1813, to March 4, 1817.

=== Later career ===
Afterwards he engaged in the practice of law in Baltimore, Maryland, but died a month later. Among his papers, was a book he wrote, entitled A Sketch of the Life, last sickness and death, of Mrs. Mary Jane Grosvenor that was published posthumously.

== Personal life ==
In March 1815, he was married to Mary Jane Hanson (1791–1814), the only daughter of Alexander C. Hanson, a lawyer and the Chancellor of Maryland, and the sister of Alexander Contee Hanson (1786–1819), a U.S. Senator. Mary Jane died later that year in 1815 from consumption.

Grosvenor died just fifteen months after his wife, on April 24, 1817, in Waterloo, Maryland, and was buried in Hudson, New York.

== See also ==
- Charles H. Grosvenor

U.S. House of Representatives
Preceded by Robert Le Roy Livingston, Asa Fitch	Member of the U.S. House of Representatives from New York's 6th congressional district 1813 with Asa Fitch	Succeeded by Jonathan Fisk
Preceded by Thomas B. Cooke	Member of the U.S. House of Representatives from New York's 5th congressional district 1813–1817	Succeeded by Philip J. Schuyler
