= Morgan Lewis Martin =

19th century American politician

Morgan L. Martin
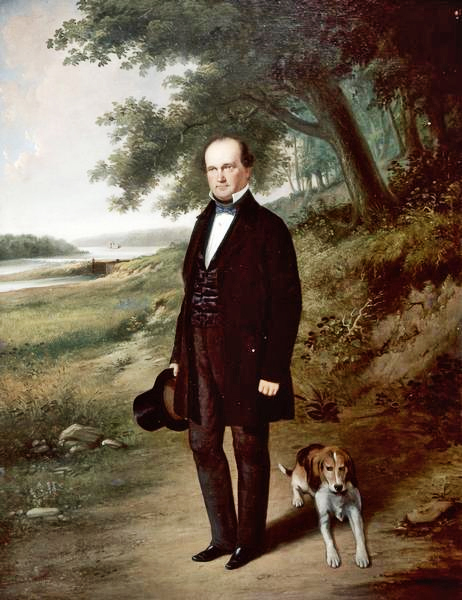
- Oil on canvas portrait by Samuel Marsden Brookes, c.1856

Member of the Wisconsin Senate from the 2nd district
- In office January 4, 1858 – January 2, 1860
- Preceded by: Perry H. Smith
- Succeeded by: Edward Decker

Member of the Wisconsin State Assembly
- In office January 5, 1874 – January 4, 1875
- Preceded by: Joseph S. Curtis
- Succeeded by: Thomas R. Hudd
- Constituency: Brown–Door–Kewaunee 1st district
- In office January 1, 1855 – January 7, 1856
- Preceded by: Francis X. Desnoyers
- Succeeded by: John Day
- Constituency: Brown–Door–Kewaunee district

Delegate to the U.S. House of Representatives from the Wisconsin Territory's at-large district
- In office March 4, 1845 – March 3, 1847
- Preceded by: Henry Dodge
- Succeeded by: John H. Tweedy

President of the Council of the Wisconsin Territory
- In office March 18, 1843 – December 4, 1843
- Preceded by: Moses M. Strong
- Succeeded by: Marshall Strong

Personal details
- Born: Morgan Lewis Martin; March 31, 1805 Martinsburg, New York, U.S.
- Died: December 10, 1887 (aged 82) Green Bay, Wisconsin, U.S.
- Party: Democratic
- Spouse: Elizabeth Smith (m. 1837–1887)
- Children: Stephen Leonard Martin^{(b. 1838; died 1890)}; Anne Elizabeth Martin^{(b. 1846; died 1862)}; Melancton Martin^{(b. 1847; died 1849)}; Sarah Greene Martin^{(b. 1850; died 1939)}; Morgan Lewis Martin Jr.^{(b. 1852; died 1935)}; Deborah Beaumont Martin^{(b. 1854; died 1931)}
- Parents: Walter Martin (father); Sarah (Turner) Martin (mother)
- Relatives: Adam Martin (grandfather); David Thomas (uncle); Asa Fitch Sr. (uncle); Asa Fitch Jr. (cousin); James Duane Doty (cousin); John Safford Fiske (grand-nephew)
- Education: Hamilton College, New York (BA)

Military service
- Allegiance: United States
- Branch/service: United States Army; Union Army
- Years of service: 1861–1865
- Rank: Major, USA
- Battles/wars: American Civil War

Morgan Lewis Martin Sr. (March 31, 1805 – December 10, 1887) was an American lawyer, land speculator, Democratic politician, and one of Wisconsin's founding fathers. He was one of the first lawyers in what is now Wisconsin, and represented the Wisconsin Territory as a delegate to the U.S. House of Representatives during the 29th Congress (1845–1847). He was also president of the constitutional convention that crafted the Constitution of Wisconsin in the winter of 1847–1848, and served in the Council (upper legislative chamber) of the Wisconsin Territory from 1838 to 1844, representing Brown County.

Martin arrived in the area that is now Wisconsin before the Wisconsin Territory was created, when it was still part of the Michigan Territory; he also served in the Michigan Territory legislature in the 1830s. During those early years, he was also instrumental in the development of the city of Milwaukee, Wisconsin; he was a financial partner to Solomon Juneau in his original land claims in what is now Milwaukee, he sketched one of the first maps of the area, assisted Juneau in platting the original Milwaukee village, and assisted in constructing several of the first buildings.

After Wisconsin achieved statehood, he served two years each in the Wisconsin Senate (1858 & 1859) and State Assembly (1855 & 1874). He also served as a Union Army paymaster and U.S. Indian Agent during the 1860s, and served as vice president of the Wisconsin Historical Society and probate judge for Brown County in the last decade of his life.

Martin was a first cousin of Wisconsin Territory governor James Duane Doty. His father, Walter Martin, and grandfather, Adam Martin, served in the New York legislature.

== Early life and career ==
He was born in Martinsburg, New York, and graduated from Hamilton College in 1824. Martin then moved to Detroit, Michigan, in 1826, and studied law, and became an attorney. In May 1827, Martin moved to what is now Green Bay, Wisconsin, on the advice of his cousin, James Duane Doty, to practice law. He formed a partnership with Solomon Juneau and owned much of the land that later became Milwaukee, but sold his share in 1836.

== Wisconsin political career ==
Martin served in the Michigan Territorial Council from 1831 to 1835. At the time, the land that would become Wisconsin was a part of the Michigan Territory. He served in the Wisconsin Territorial Legislature from 1838 to 1844, and served as President of the Territorial Council in 1843. He also served as President at the second Wisconsin Constitutional Convention.

Martin was elected on the Democratic Party ticket as a non-voting member to represent the Wisconsin Territory in the Twenty-ninth Congress, with 6,803 votes to 5,787 for Whig James Collins and 790 for Edward D. Holton of the Liberty Party. He would serve from March 4, 1845, to March 3, 1847.

Martin was a candidate for Governor at the 1848 Wisconsin Democratic Party Convention prior to the state's first gubernatorial election. At the time, the party was split between a faction representing the lead-mining regions of the state, supporting Hiram Barber, and a faction of the eastern counties, supporting Martin. The deadlock between the two factions resulted in a compromise pick—Nelson Dewey.

Martin served in the Wisconsin State Assembly in 1855 and 1872, and served in the Wisconsin Senate in 1858 and 1859.

=== Later years ===
During the American Civil War, Martin served as an army paymaster, with the rank of major. In 1875, he became county judge (probate judge) of Brown County, serving until his death. Martin was also involved in the banking and railroad business. He died in Green Bay, Wisconsin, where he had lived and practiced law, and was buried there.

== Personal life and legacy ==
Morgan Lewis Martin was one of at least 8 children born to Walter Martin (1764–1834) and his first wife Sarah (née Turner; 1770–1815). Walter Martin was a prominent politician in northern New York, he was the founder and namesake of Martinsburg, New York. He also served as a state senator in the 1810s and brigadier general in the New York militia during the War of 1812.

Morgan Lewis Martin was a first cousin to Wisconsin Territory governor James Duane Doty; Doty's mother was a sister of Martin's father. The entomologist and historian Asa Fitch is also a first cousin. The Martin family were descended from the colonist Thomas Martin Sr., who emigrated from England to the Massachusetts Bay Colony in the mid-1600s.

Morgan Lewis Martin was named for former New York governor Morgan Lewis, who was also the namesake of Lewis County, New York, where he was born.

Morgan Lewis Martin married Elizabeth Smith in the summer of 1837. Elizabeth was also the daughter of a prominent family of Northern New York. They had at least six children together, though one child died in infancy.

Martin's eldest son, Stephen Leonard Martin, graduated from the United States Military Academy and served as a lieutenant in the 5th U.S. Artillery Regiment during the American Civil War. Toward the end of the war, he was commissioned as colonel of the 51st Wisconsin Infantry Regiment.

Martin has a school named after him in Green Bay, Morgan L. Martin Elementary School. His home, known as Hazelwood, is listed on the National Register of Historic Places. A Westside neighborhood in Milwaukee is also named after him.

Wisconsin State Assembly
| Preceded by Francis X. Desnoyers | Member of the Wisconsin State Assembly from the Brown–Door–Kewaunee district January 1, 1855 – January 7, 1856 | Succeeded by John Day |
| Preceded by Joseph S. Curtis | Member of the Wisconsin State Assembly from the Brown 1st district January 5, 1874 – January 4, 1875 | Succeeded by Thomas R. Hudd |
Wisconsin Senate
| Preceded by Perry H. Smith | Member of the Wisconsin Senate from the 2nd district January 4, 1858 – January 2, 1860 | Succeeded by Edward Decker |
U.S. House of Representatives
| Preceded by Henry Dodge | Delegate to the U.S. House of Representatives from the Wisconsin Territory's at-large congressional district 1845–1847 | Succeeded by John H. Tweedy |
Legal offices
| Preceded by David Agry | County Judge of Brown County, Wisconsin; January 1, 1876 – December 10, 1887 | Succeeded by Howard J. Huntington |
