= Jonathan Fisk =

American politician (1778–1832)

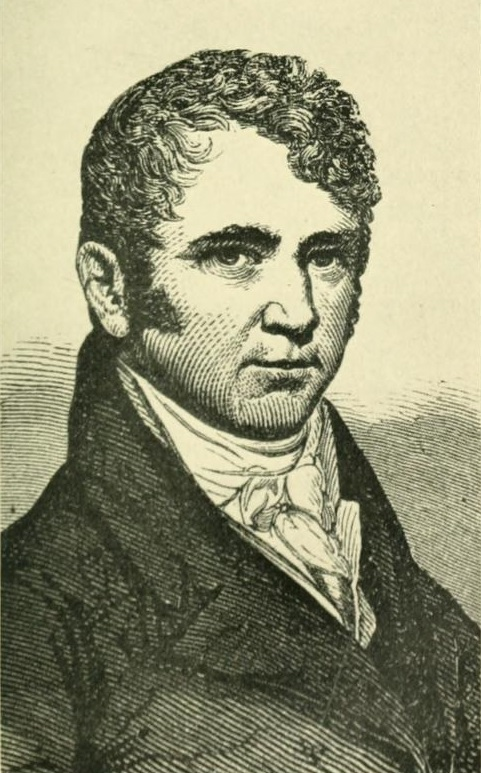

Member of the U.S. House of Representatives from New York
- In office March 4, 1809 – March 3, 1811
- Preceded by: Gurdon S. Mumford, George Clinton, Jr.
- Succeeded by: Pierre Van Cortlandt, Jr.
- Constituency: 3rd district
- In office March 4, 1813 – March 21, 1815
- Preceded by: Asa Fitch; Thomas P. Grosvenor
- Succeeded by: James W. Wilkin
- Constituency: 6th district

Personal details
- Born: September 26, 1778 Amherst, Hillsborough County, New Hampshire, U.S.
- Died: July 13, 1832 (aged 53) Newburgh; Orange County, New York, U.S.
- Resting place: Old Town Cemetery; Newburgh, New York
- Party: Democratic-Republican
- Spouse: Sarah Van Kleek Fisk
- Children: Theodore S. Fisk; James L Fisk; Delphine R. E. Fisk and Mary M Fisk
- Profession: Teacher; Lawyer; Politician

Jonathan Fisk (September 26, 1778 – July 13, 1832) was an American lawyer and politician who served as United States Representative for the third District of New York.

== Early life ==
Fisk was born in Amherst, Hillsborough County, New Hampshire, attended the public schools, taught school in Weare, New Hampshire, and later removed to New York City to read law. He was admitted to the bar in Westchester County, New York, in 1799, and began to practice in Newburgh, New York in 1800.

== Career ==
Elected as a Democratic-Republican to the 11th United States Congress, Fisk was United States Representative for the third district of New York from March 4, 1809, to March 3, 1811. He was again elected to the 13th and 14th United States Congresses, representing the sixth district of New York from March 4, 1813, to March 21, 1815, when he accepted a recess appointment by President James Madison as United States Attorney for the Southern District of New York. He was confirmed by the United States Senate on January 6, 1816, and remained in office until June 30, 1819. Afterwards he resumed the practice of law.

== Death ==
Fisk died in Newburgh, Orange County, New York on July 13, 1832 (age 53 years, 291 days). He is interred at Old Town Cemetery, Newburgh, New York.

== Family life ==
Fisk was the son of Mary Bragg Fisk and Jonathan Fisk, who was appointed Judge of Probate for the District of Randolph in 1800. He married Sarah Van Kleek (1773–1832) and they had four children, Theodore S, James L, Delphine R. E., and Mary M.

U.S. House of Representatives
| Preceded by Gurdon S. Mumford, George Clinton, Jr. | Member of the U.S. House of Representatives from New York's 3rd congressional district 1809–1811 | Succeeded by Pierre Van Cortlandt, Jr. |
| Preceded by Asa Fitch; Thomas P. Grosvenor | Member of the U.S. House of Representatives from New York's 6th congressional district 1813–1815 | Succeeded by James W. Wilkin |
Legal offices
| Preceded by Nathan Sanford as U.S. Attorney for the District of New York | U.S. Attorney for the Southern District of New York; 1815–1819 | Succeeded by Robert L. Tillotson |
