= Lewis Cass expedition =

1820 survey in the Michigan Territory

The Lewis Cass expedition of 1820 was a survey of the western part of Michigan Territory led by Lewis Cass, governor of the territory. On January 14, 1820, United States Secretary of War John C. Calhoun authorized Cass to lead a party of scientists, soldiers, Canadian voyageurs, and Native Americans into the wilderness of western Michigan Territory. The purpose of the expedition was to:

- survey the geography and topography of the region in order to produce a complete map
- survey the flora and fauna of the region
- survey the Indians of the region, their numbers, tribes, customs, and loyalties, whether to the United States or Great Britain
- select and purchase sites for forts, especially at Sault Ste. Marie
- survey the geology of the region, especially with regard to commercially valuable minerals
- search for the source of the Mississippi River

== Members ==
The expedition consisted of 42 men as follows:

- Lewis Cass, Governor of Michigan Territory
- Captain David Bates Douglass, Corps of Engineers, Professor of Mathematics at the United States Military Academy at West Point, served as topographer with additional responsibility for surveying plants and animals
- Henry Schoolcraft, mineralogist and geologist
- Dr. Alexander Wolcott Jr., physician, Indian Agent at Chicago
- James Duane Doty, secretary to the expedition
- Lieutenant Aeneus Mackay, artillery
- Robert A. Forsyth, private secretary to Governor Cass
- Charles C. Trowbridge, assistant to Captain Douglass
- Alexander R. Chase, assistant to Captain Douglass
- James Riley, interpreter
- Roy, a Frenchman, served as pilot on Lake Superior
- Baptiste, a soldier, served as cook
- 10 Canadian voyageurs managed the canoes
- 10 United States soldiers served as escort
- 10 Native Americans served as hunters, their names and tribes as follows:
  - Joseph Parks, Shawnee, served as interpreter
  - Kewaychoskum, an Ottawa chief
  - Manitouwaba (the devil's view), Ottawa
  - Haepsanze, Ottawa
  - Wyangding (source of the winds), Ojibwa
  - Oshashebaquato (many openings in the clouds), Ojibwa
  - Wyamgboyeausha (scattered by the wind), Ojibwa
  - Waubonequet (pale cloud), Ojibwa
  - Omezekekezchie (the rays of light striking the earth), Ojibwa
  - Macatawasim (black dog), Potawatomi, discharged at Grosse Pointe

== From Detroit to the Mississippi ==
The expedition departed Detroit in four large canoes on May 24, 1820. It took three days to reach Fort Gratiot, located near the entrance to Lake Huron. The commander of the fort, Major Cummings, exchanged five of his sixty soldiers for two from the expedition who had become ill. On June 6 the expedition reached Michilimackinac where they awaited the arrival of additional supplies. On June 13 the party departed Michilimackinac bound for Sault Ste. Marie escorted by a twelve-oared barge carrying a military detachment intended to overawe the Native Americans.

At Sault Ste. Marie, Cass called a council of the Ojibwa to obtain their permission to establish an Indian agency. The Ojibwa, many of whom were loyal to the British, expressed their displeasure with the American proposal. One of their chiefs known as "the count", dressed in the uniform of a British officer, raised a British flag near the expedition's camp. Cass tore down the flag and trampled it under foot, which brought about the submission of the Native Americans, who ceded 16 square miles (41 km^{2}) on the St. Mary's River where Fort Brady was constructed two years later.

The expedition proceeded west along the southern shore of Lake Superior portaging across the Keweenaw Peninsula. A contingent including Cass, Schoolcraft, and Doty made a side trip 30 miles (48 km) up the Ontonagon River to see the huge mass of copper known as the copper rock. At the western end of Lake Superior the expedition proceeded up the Saint Louis River to the American Fur Company's post at Fond du Lac.

Six miles further up the river Cass split his party. Schoolcraft, Doty, and 14 others struck out across country for the American Fur Company's post at Sandy Lake near the Mississippi River, while Cass and the rest of the party continued up the Saint Louis River heading for the same destination. The overland party lost the trail and struggled through swamps and knee-deep mud, yet arrived at Sandy Lake two days ahead of Cass's group. Cass and the scientific staff ascended the Mississippi in search of its source. They went as far as the lake that now bears Cass's name and then returned to the post at Sandy Lake.

== Return to Detroit ==
Taking 16 Ojibwa with them, the expedition descended the Mississippi, pausing to hunt buffalo along the banks. Near the Falls of Saint Anthony they encountered an encampment of the Fifth Infantry under the command of Lieutenant Colonel Henry Leavenworth. Here the resident Indian agent, Major Lawrence Taliaferro called together the local Sioux for a ceremony of peace with the Ojibwa accompanying the Cass expedition.

The expedition continued down the Mississippi stopping at Sioux villages to smoke the pipe of peace. On August 5 the party reached Fort Crawford at Prairie du Chien, the westernmost post in Michigan Territory. Schoolcraft made a brief side trip to the lead mines near Dubuque, after which the entire expedition ascended the Wisconsin River to the Fox-Wisconsin portage and descended the Fox River to Green Bay, where they were greeted by a salute from the guns of Fort Howard. At Green Bay Cass dismissed the soldiers and shipped the natural history specimens collected by the scientists to Detroit. He led most of the remaining men down the western shore of Lake Michigan to Chicago.

Dr. Wolcott and a few companions remained at the Indian agency at Chicago. Governor Cass returned to Detroit on horseback via the Indian trail, while Schoolcraft and Captain Douglass traveled up the eastern shore of Lake Michigan to Michilimackinac where they joined Doty and a couple other members of the expedition who had traveled there directly from Green Bay. This group retraced the expedition's route down Lake Huron to Detroit, arriving there on September 24, 1820, 124 days after their departure.

== Results ==
The Lewis Cass expedition, which cost $6,300, resulted in a series of anonymous articles in the Detroit Gazette in the winter of 1820-21, a 419-page book by Henry Schoolcraft, and at least 15 scientific papers. Schoolcraft's book, Narrative Journal of Travels...from Detroit...to the Sources of the Mississippi River, sold 1,200 copies within a few months of its publication in 1821.
