= Martin Drive, Milwaukee =

Human settlement in Milwaukee, Wisconsin, United States of America

Coordinates: 43.0465534°N 87.9652721°W

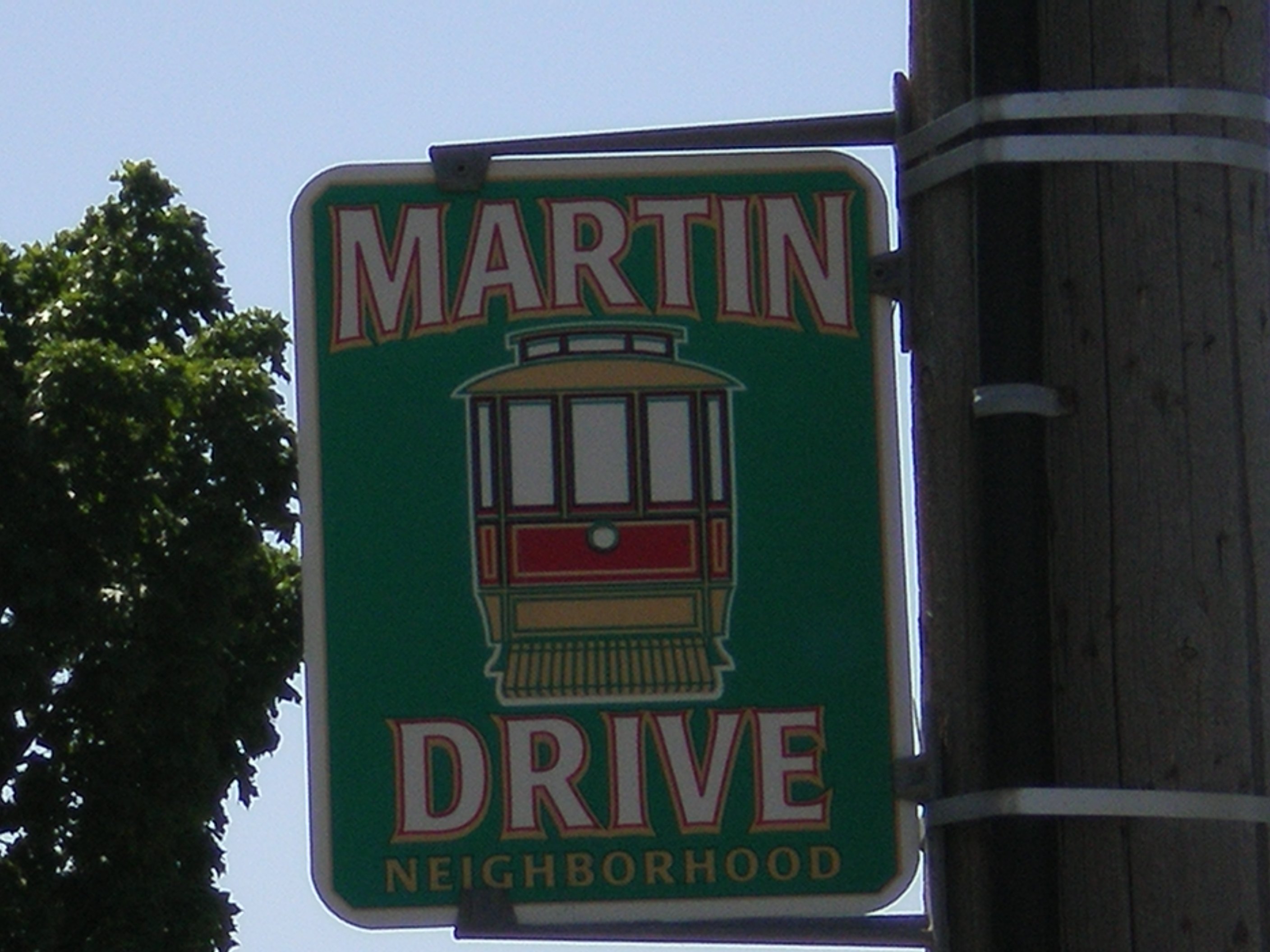
Martin Drive

The Martin Drive neighborhood of Milwaukee is a residential district on the west side of the city. It is named for the local 19th-century politician Morgan Lewis Martin. Housing development started in the 1920s around two breweries. The area has benefited from local improvement programs and community activities since the 1990s.

== Geography ==
The Martin Drive neighborhood is located on Milwaukee's west side. The neighborhood is located north and west of Miller Brewing Company. It includes Harley-Davidson and the Highland Boulevard Viaduct. The neighborhood was built up in the 1920s and is home to several old apartment buildings. The neighborhood has retained its density and is still one of the safest neighborhoods in the city. Martin Drive is bordered by Martin Drive in the south, 35th Street in the east, Vliet Street in the north, and WIS 175 in the west. Milwaukee's Washington Park is located just north of the neighborhood.

== History ==
=== Naming ===
Morgan Lewis Martin

Morgan Martin, a Green Bay Lawyer and speculator, bought half of Solomon Juneau's Juneautown property for $500 in 1833. In 1835 they co-founded their new village, with Martin responsible for the legal and promotional aspects while Juneau took care of local issues. Martin, born in Martinsburg, New York in 1805 (his father founded the town), was a Wisconsin congressman, assemblyman, and state senator, as well as Oneida Indian Agent in Green Bay. He died in 1887.

A street in the village was named for Martin, but during the 1920s renaming program it was changed to State Street. To appease those who complained that Martin deserved a place on the city's map, this street, one block south of Juneau Avenue, was renamed Martin Drive in 1926.

=== Development ===
The building era for Martin Drive began in about the late 1910s. Original plats of the area allowed commercial building on what is now State Street, with two breweries—the Gettleman brewery and Plank Road Brewery—located in the area adjacent to the Martin Drive neighborhood. Much of the early development begins with platting of Highland Avenue.

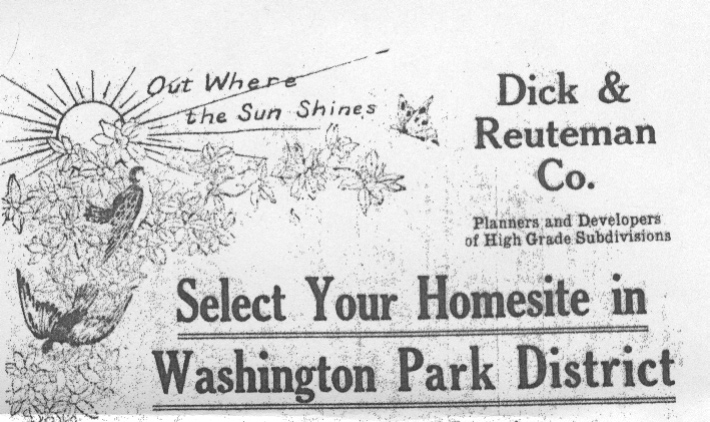
Advertisement for homes in area, circa 1920

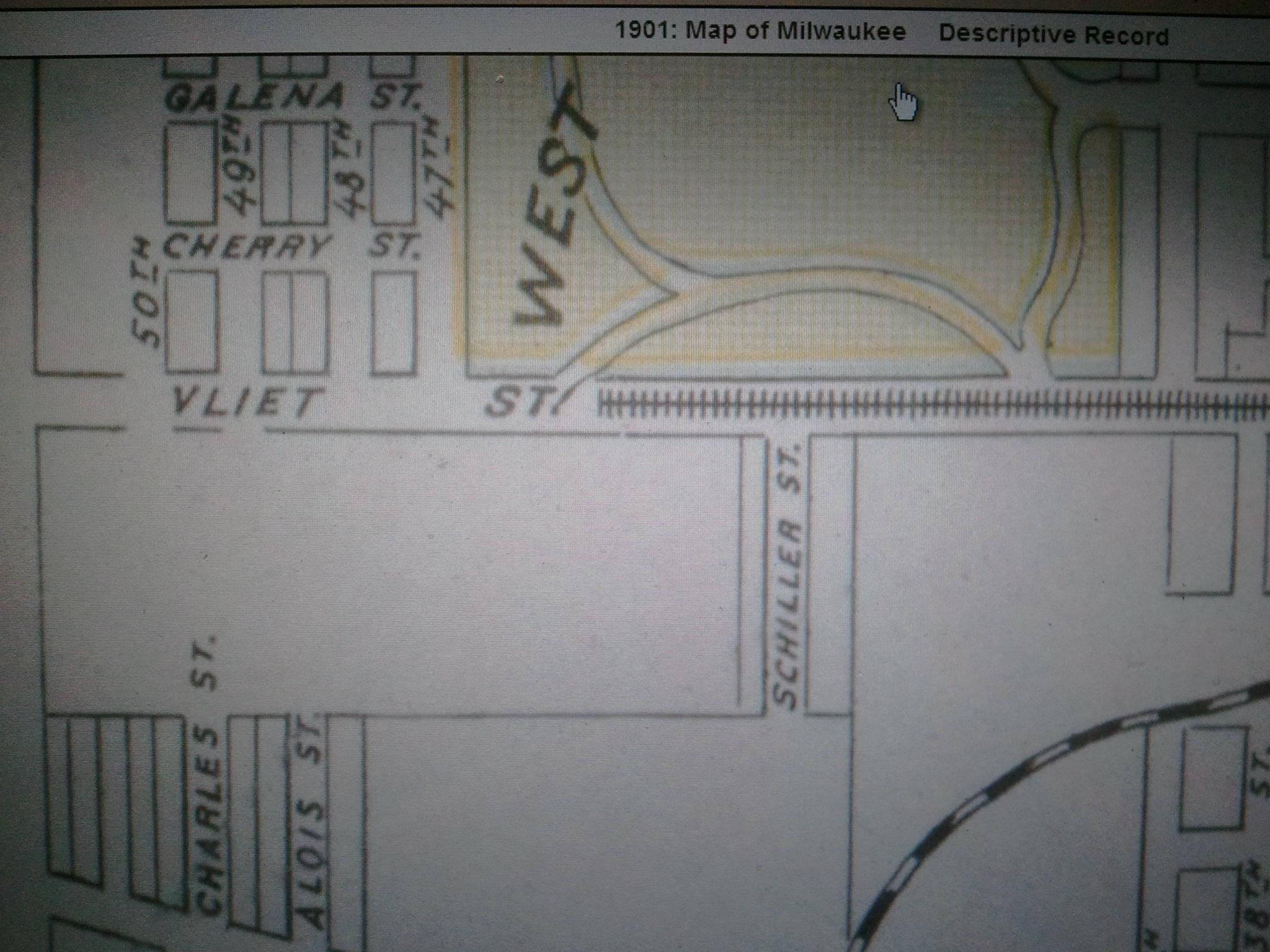
1901 map of Martin Drive neighborhood. Schiller Street is now the 1200-1300 block of North 43rd Street. Address numbers were different back then. A neighbor looked up an address of a house built in 1905. Back then the address was 398 Schiller Street. Today the house is 1260 North 43rd Street.

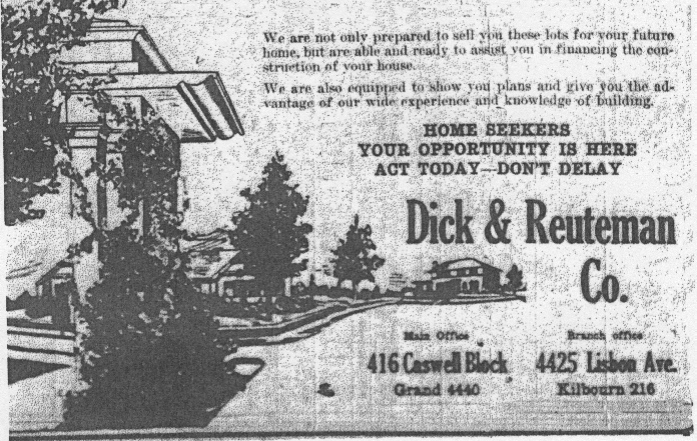
Advertisement for homes in area, circa 1920

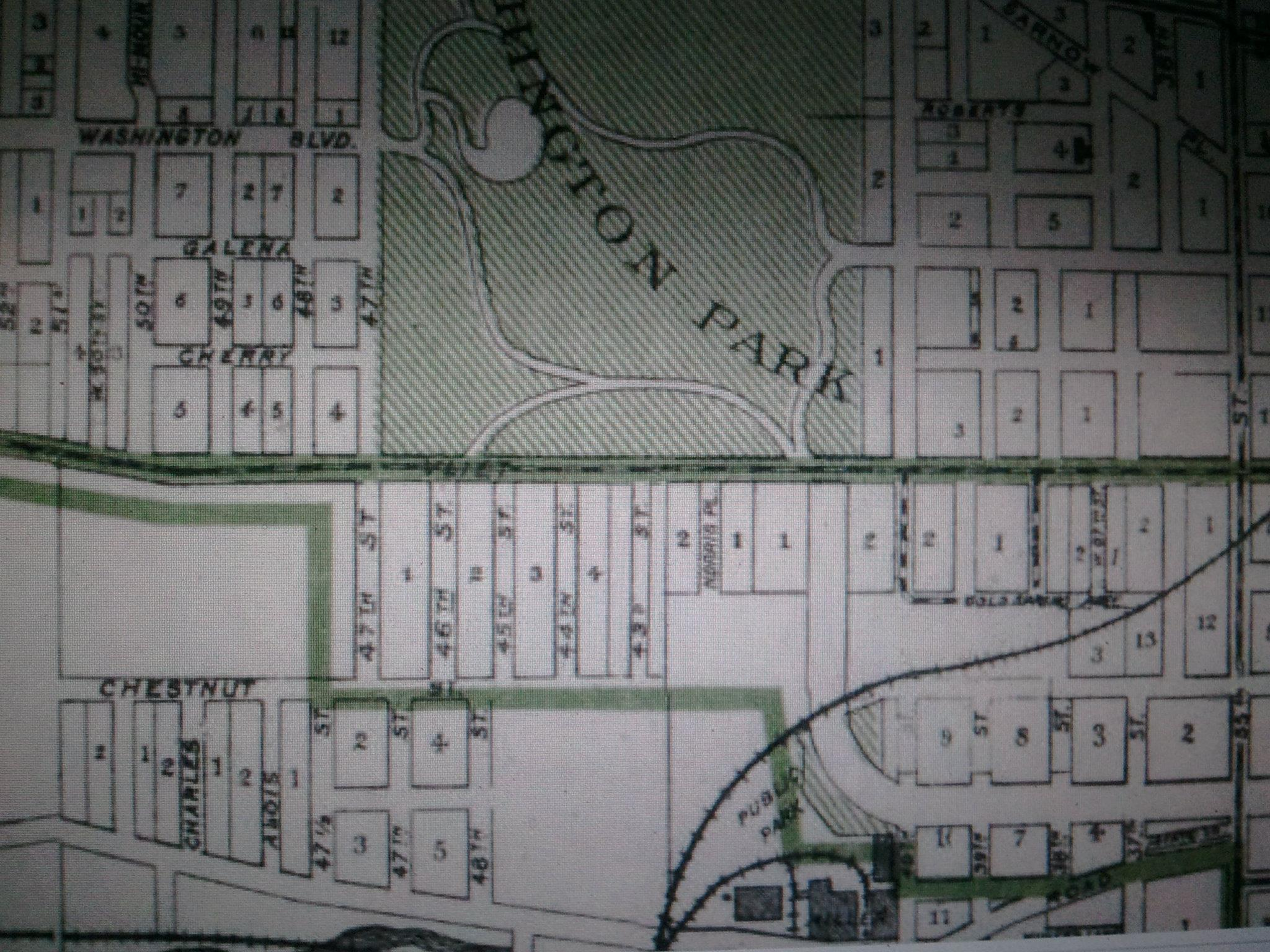
1923 map of the Martin Drive neighborhood

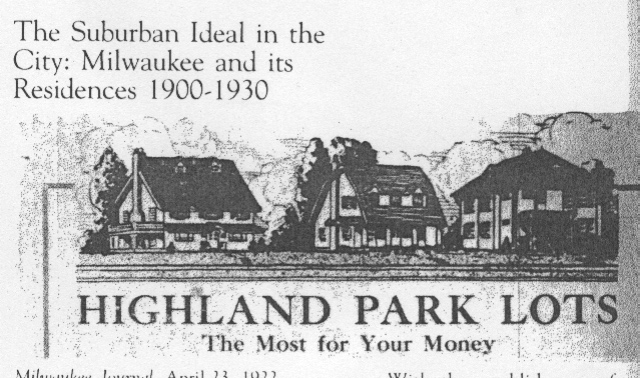
Advertisement for homes in area, circa 1920

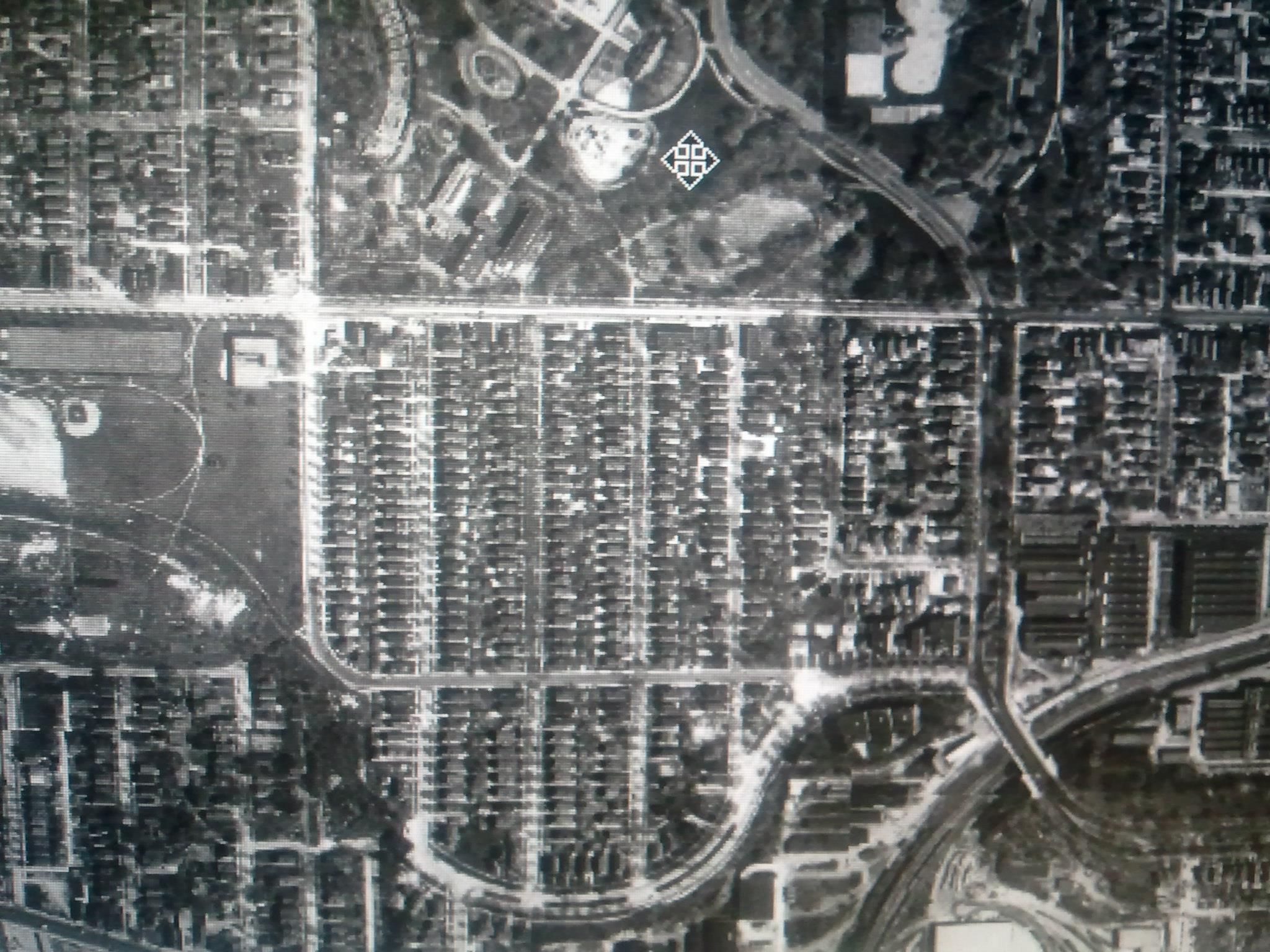
1937 map of the Martin Drive neighborhood, all present day streets are visible. Area is before Highway 41 was built, causing the moving of homes and the demolition of 47th Street in the neighborhood.

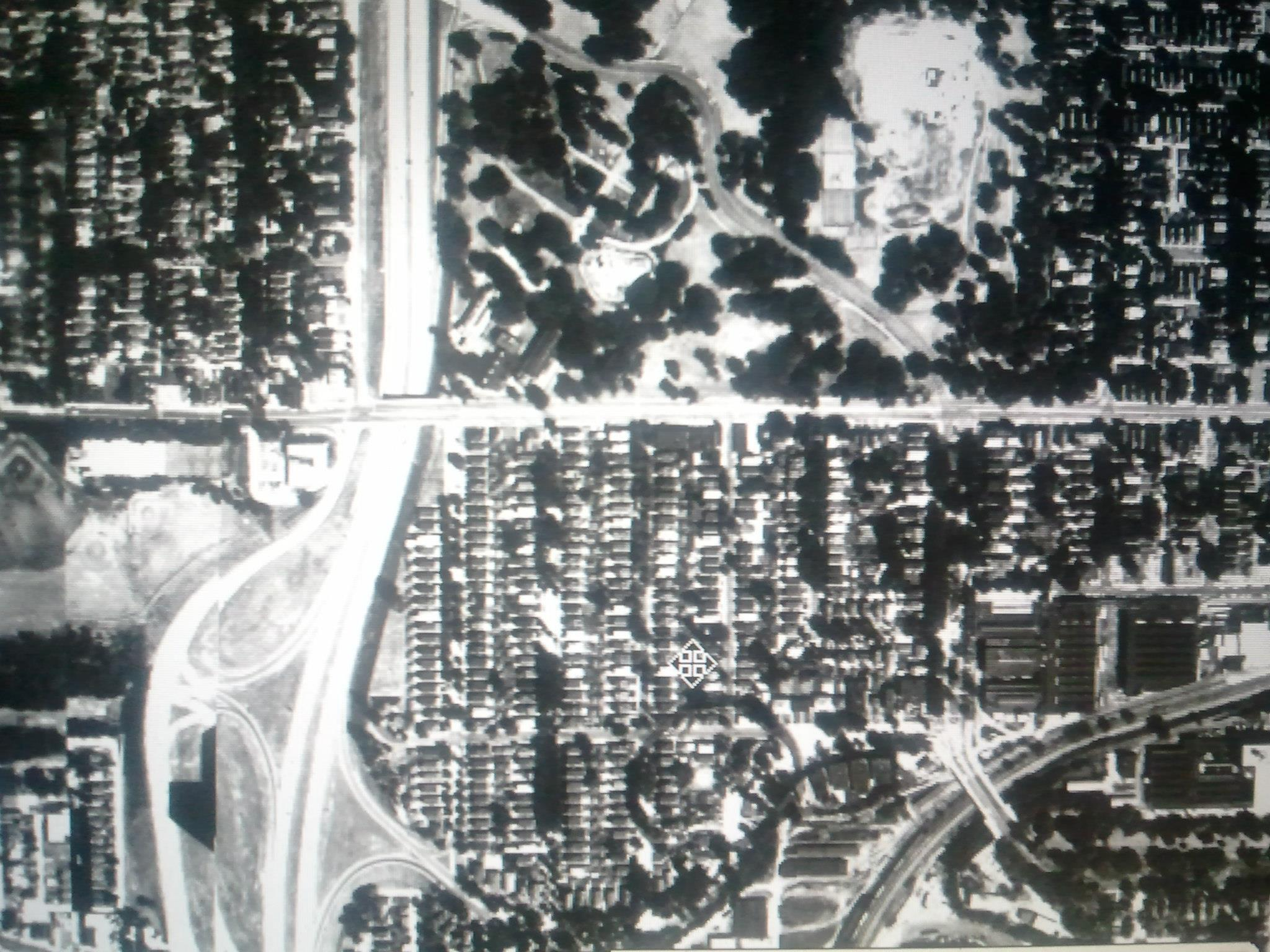
1956 map of the Martin Drive neighborhood: Highway 41 is built with an on/off ramp on a street named "Martin Drive". Forty-seventh Street in the neighborhood is demolished and houses moved/destroyed.

During the 1920s to 1950s, city boundaries at the time ended at 27th Street. The Town of Wauwatosa ran from what is now 27th Street to 124th Street. Ads began to run in the daily papers or on posted bills. An example of three ads from the period marketing property around Washington Park are pictured. The plotting of lots were completed and many houses were constructed during the period of 1920-1929. Sanborn maps were created and fire insurance risks were calculated for this region. Most homes were of frame construction. The subdivision developments of the Martin Drive neighborhood were the Park Front, Highland, Schmoldts, and Menomonee plats.

Park Front: This development includes land north of Juneau on 46th Street in the 1200 to 1300 blocks, as well as on 45th Street from the 1100 block to Vliet Street. The homes in this development were primarily frame and were a mix of duplex and single family construction. Few brick homes were found in this development.

Highland Heights: The homes and lots south of Juneau on 46th, 45th, 44th, and 43rd Streets are in the Highland Heights subdivision plat, including 46th Street to State Street. Many of the homes on 46th and 45th Streets in this development were duplexes of frame construction.

Schmoldt's: The 1200 and 1300 block of 43rd Street are in the Schmoldt's development plat. This includes some of the Vliet Street properties adjoining these streets.

Menomonee: The 1300 block on 42nd Street, including the west side of Highland Boulevard are part of the Menomonee subdivision. Many of the units on Highland Ave are larger Victorian style brick faced homes. There are also multi-unit buildings of concrete and brick.

=== Rejuvenation ===
==== The 1990s ====
In the 1990s, neighborhood improvements and neighborhood housing services started the formation of an organized block club in the surrounding neighborhoods. Revitalization efforts and corporate neighbors raised concerns and began to improve housing stock in the area. Cleanup efforts gained support with some use of block grant funding for paint and fix-up programs. Such cleanups improved the appeal of the neighborhood and new owners were drawn to dwellings in the Martin Drive neighborhood. Yearly traditions developed.

The value of a home compared to the money spent for it became a big benefit to new home buyers at this time. The new owners discovered the convenient location saved them time and helped to improve their quality of life. Other efforts by neighboring groups such as Vliet Street Business Association, Habitat for Humanity International, the Marquette Interchange improvements, Healthy Neighborhoods Initiative, and the efforts by nearby Miller Brewing Company and Harley-Davidson had positive economic effects on Martin Drive and other west side neighborhoods.

==== Present day ====
In the 21st century, improvements and updates continue as the city and neighborhood group focus on quality of life concerns. Many of the housing units have installed new windows, replaced siding, improved landscaping and fencing, added driveways, and replaced roofs. In addition, the neighborhood is seeing a growth in business on Vliet Street. Property values continue to rise because of the high quality housing stock. The neighborhood seems to have stabilized and owner occupancy continues to be a bonus for this area. Neighbors still see benefits in the annual neighborhood cleanups and many families participate in the Halloween trick or treat, neighborhood-wide rummage sale, summer picnic, holiday caroling and other neighborhood activities. In 2008, a Sunday farmer's market developed across the street from the neighborhood at the Washington Park Senior Center. In 2009, a community garden developed at 46th and Vliet Street with a green space neighbors use for summer picnics. Three planters identify the neighborhood. In 2010, stone markers and new plantings mark boundaries for the neighborhood. In 2011, outdoor evening movies started at a community garden. In 2012, Little Free Libraries were first installed in the neighborhood. Neighbors are more active and have more dialog within the community, primarily at the monthly neighborhood meetings, but also are using the Internet and e-mail to facilitate these neighborhood communications.

After several decades of stagnant growth the neighborhood is now seeing redevelopment with a few new businesses and building renovations. As such, the neighborhood supports many small and upstart businesses such as Eat Cake, and the nearby Vliet Street Business Association. Martin Drive has several private and public schools nearby. Grocery stores, hardware stores and pharmacies are in close proximity to the Martin Drive neighborhood. The neighborhood has a strong and dedicated volunteer-led neighborhood association, the Martin Drive Neighborhood Association.

In 2014, neighbors formed a non-profit, called Martin Drive Neighborhood, Inc. It is used as the fundraising arm for the neighborhood association to, "ensure and sustain the many activities and traditions that build community, promote neighborliness and makes Martin Drive Neighborhood a unique, safe and pleasant place to live, own a home and raise a family." The neighborhood was also named a Targeted Investment Neighborhood. The initiative is designed to sustain and increase owner-occupancy, provide high quality affordable rental housing, strengthen property values, and improve the physical appearance and quality of life of neighborhoods.

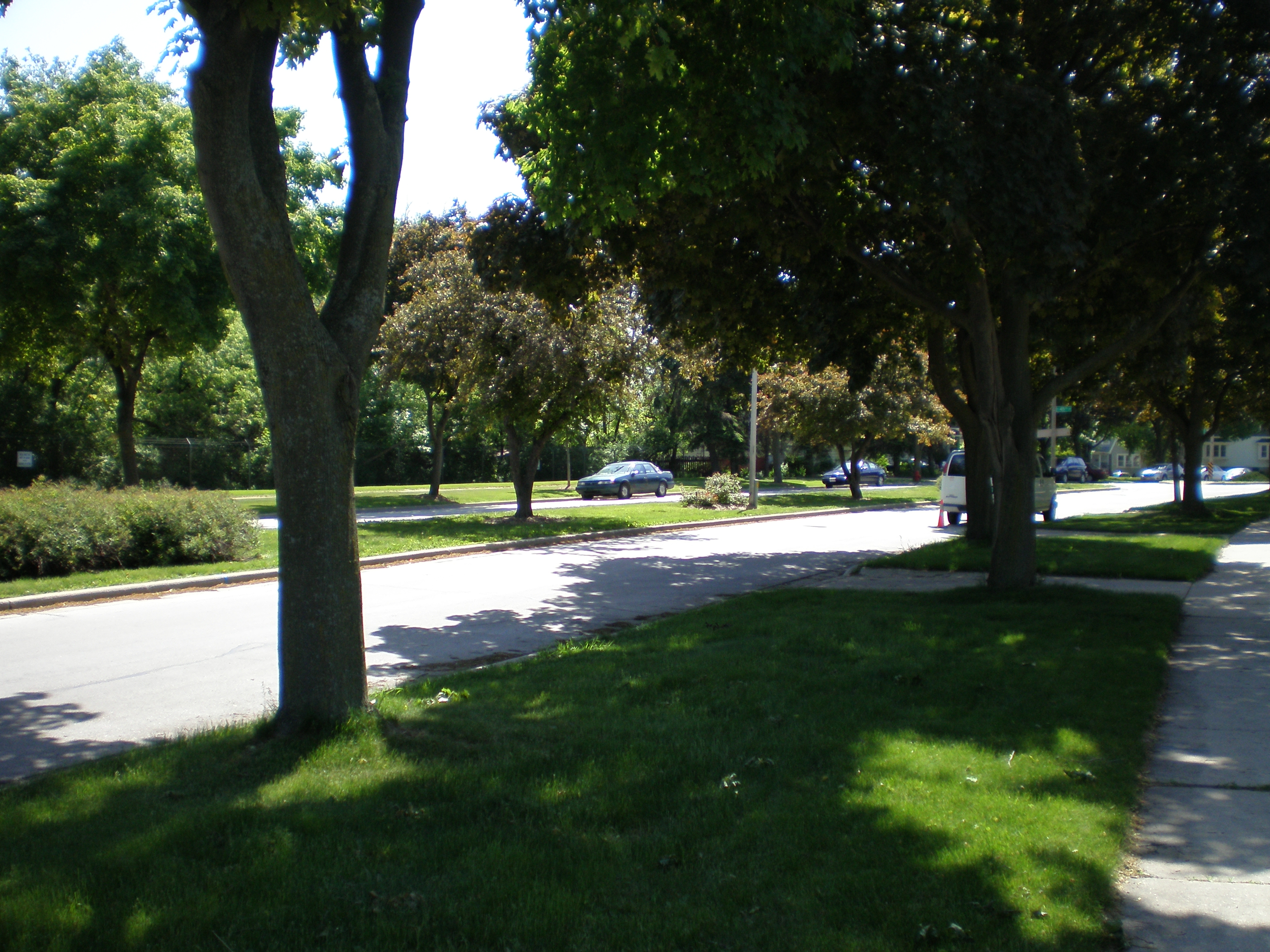
Tree-lined Boulevard divides up two-way traffic

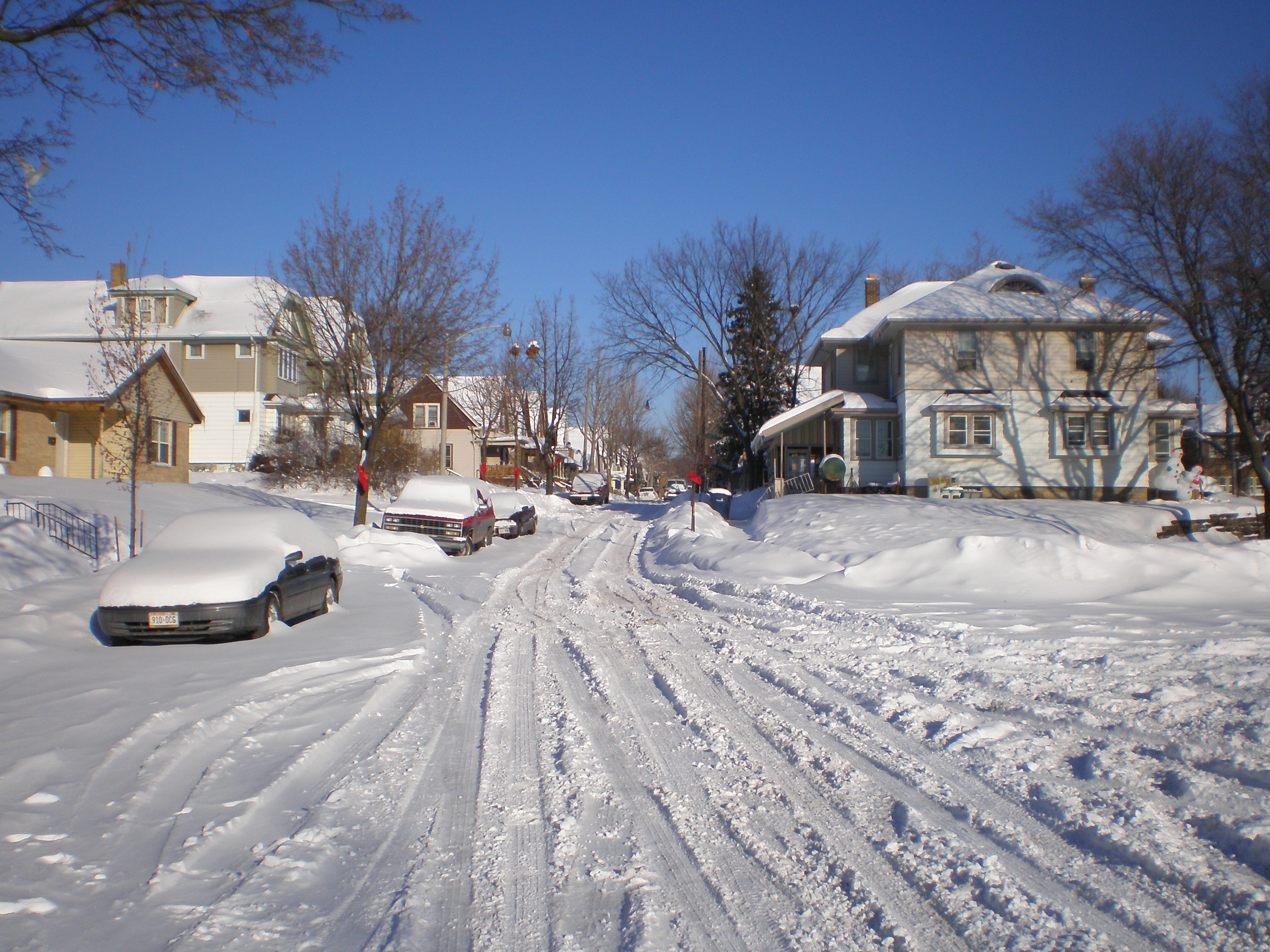
Holiday bows are added to the trees each winter

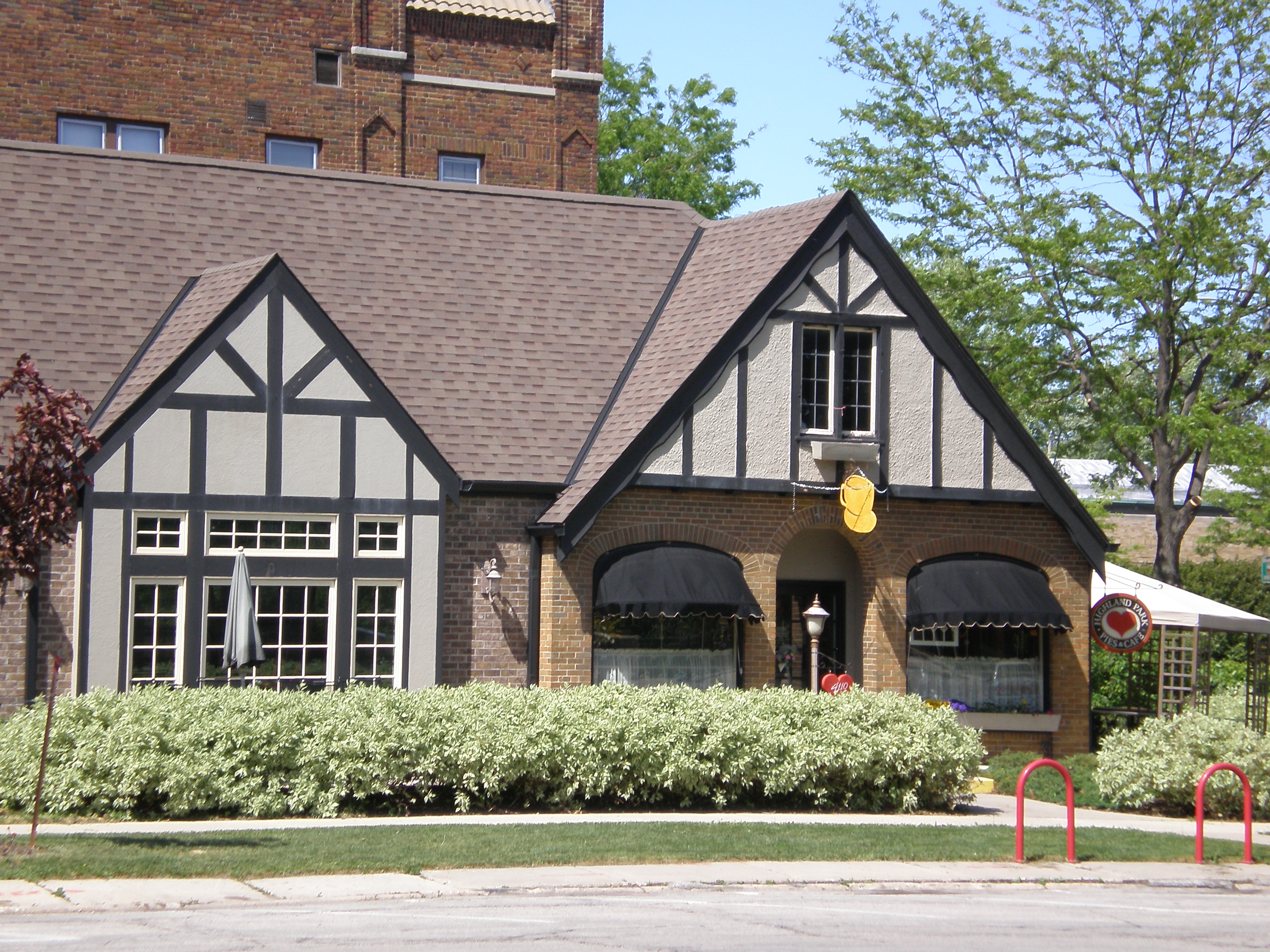
Birdie's Cafe at Highland Boulevard and Martin Drive

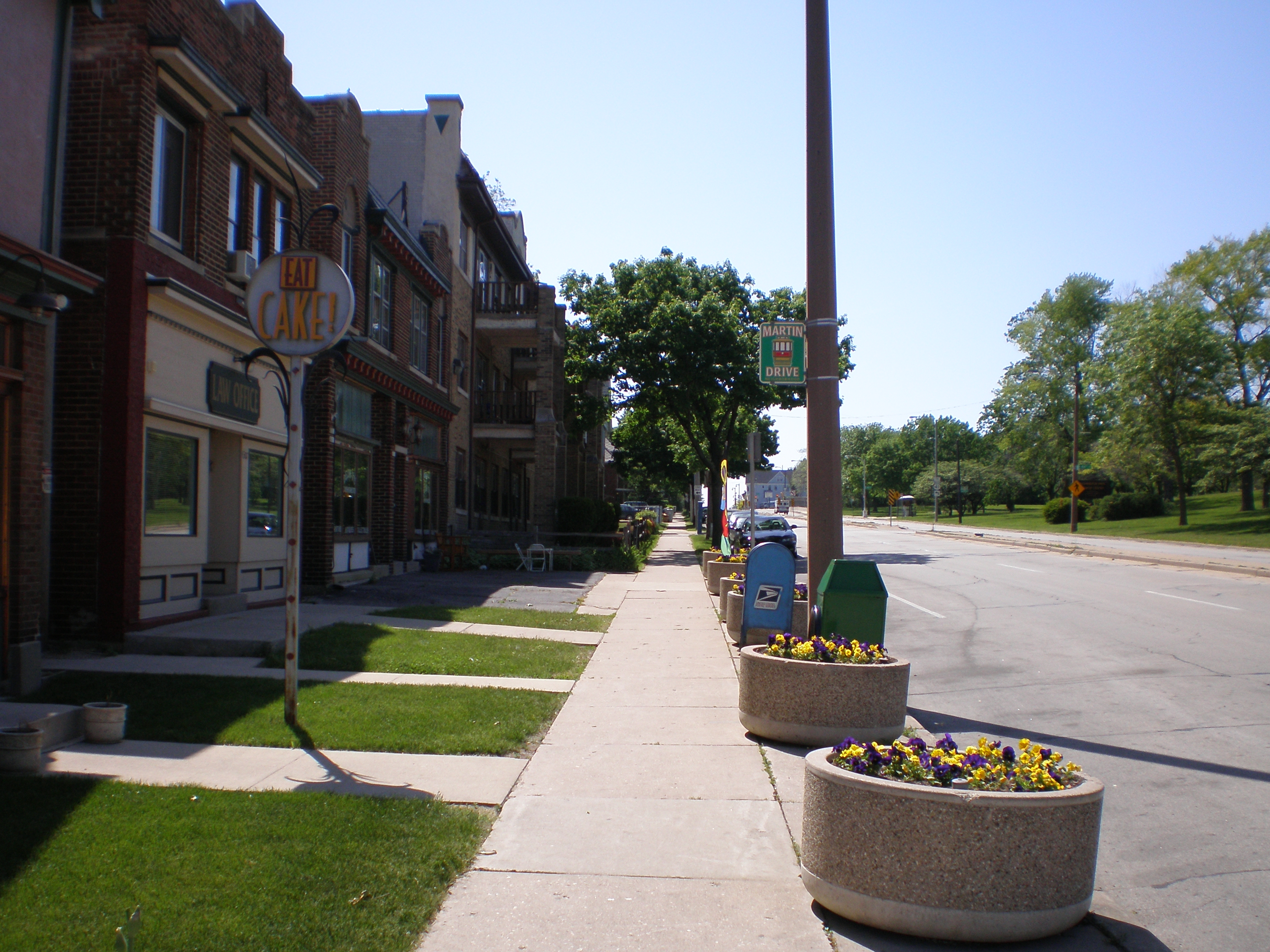
Businesses along Vliet Street

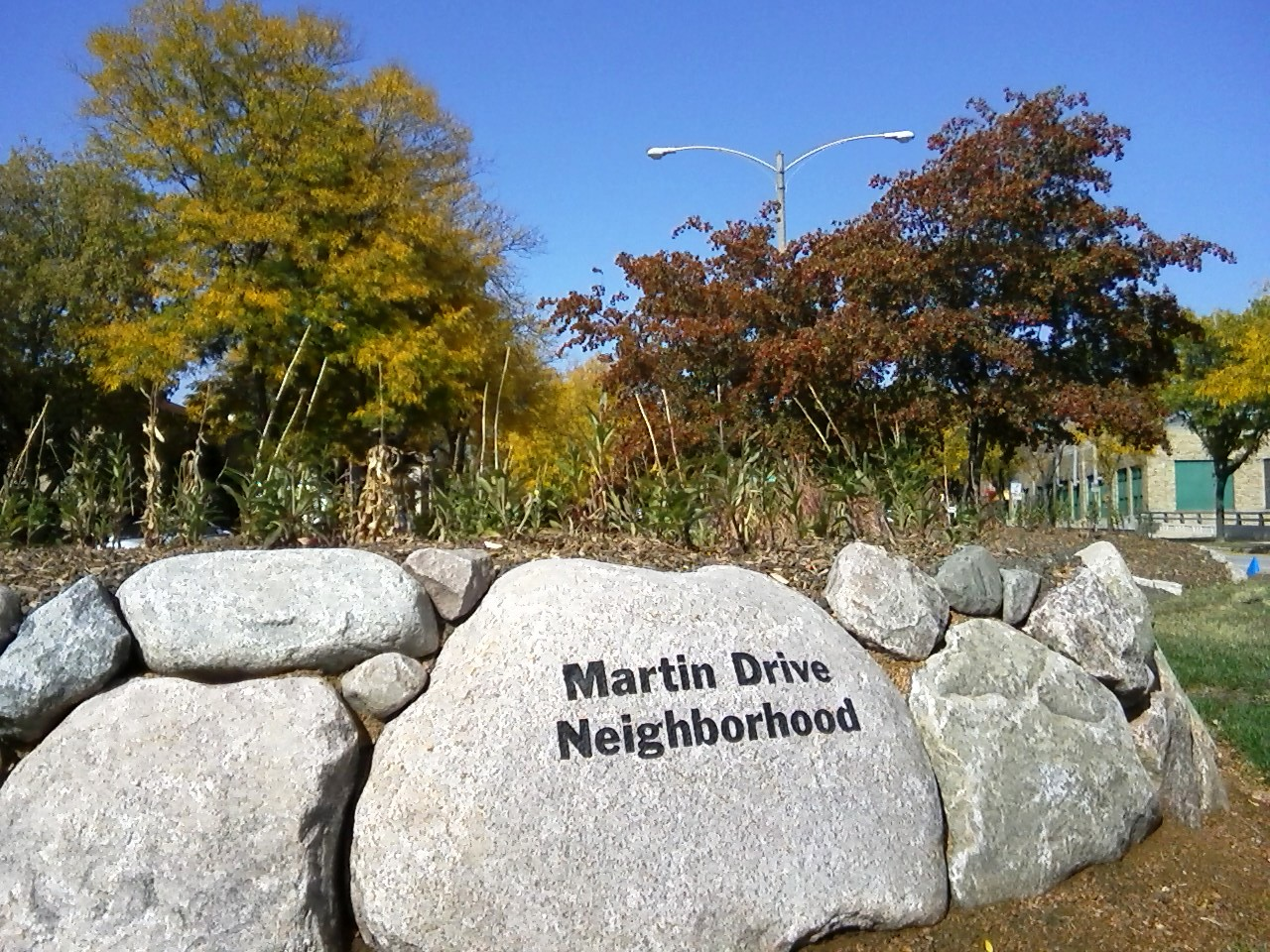
Boulevard Stone

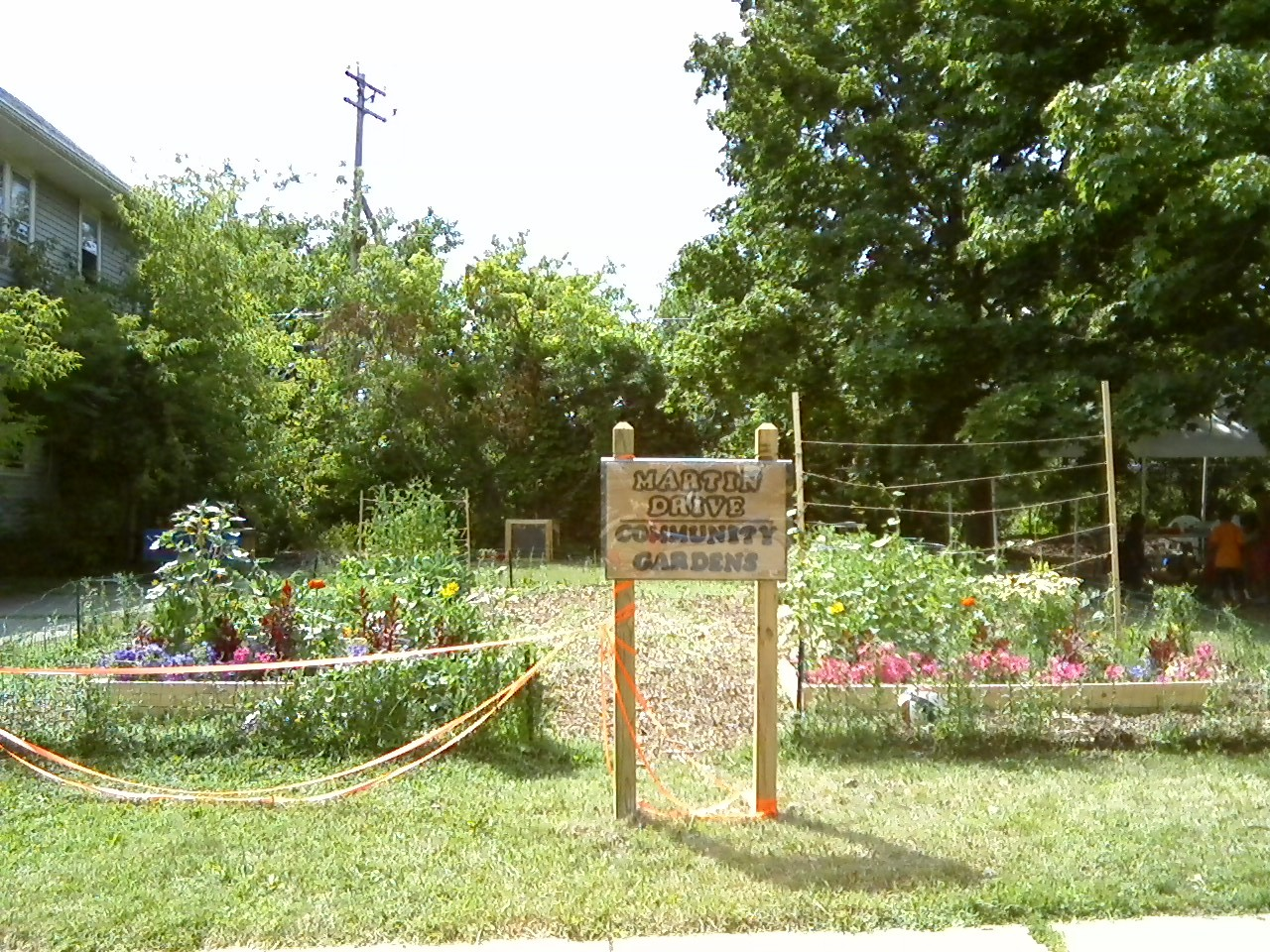
Community Garden

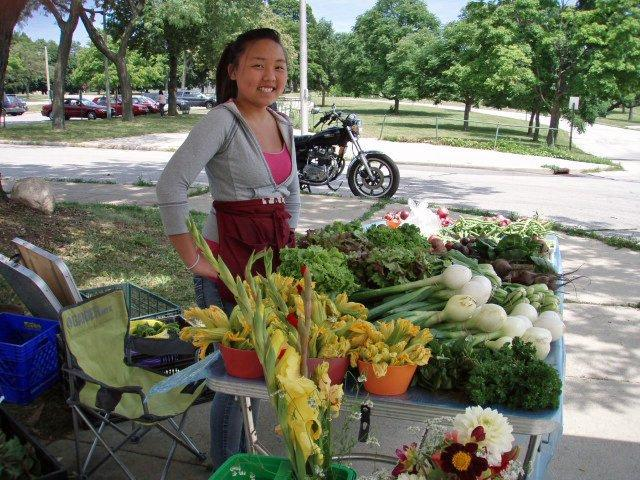
Farmer's Market at the Washington Park Senior Center

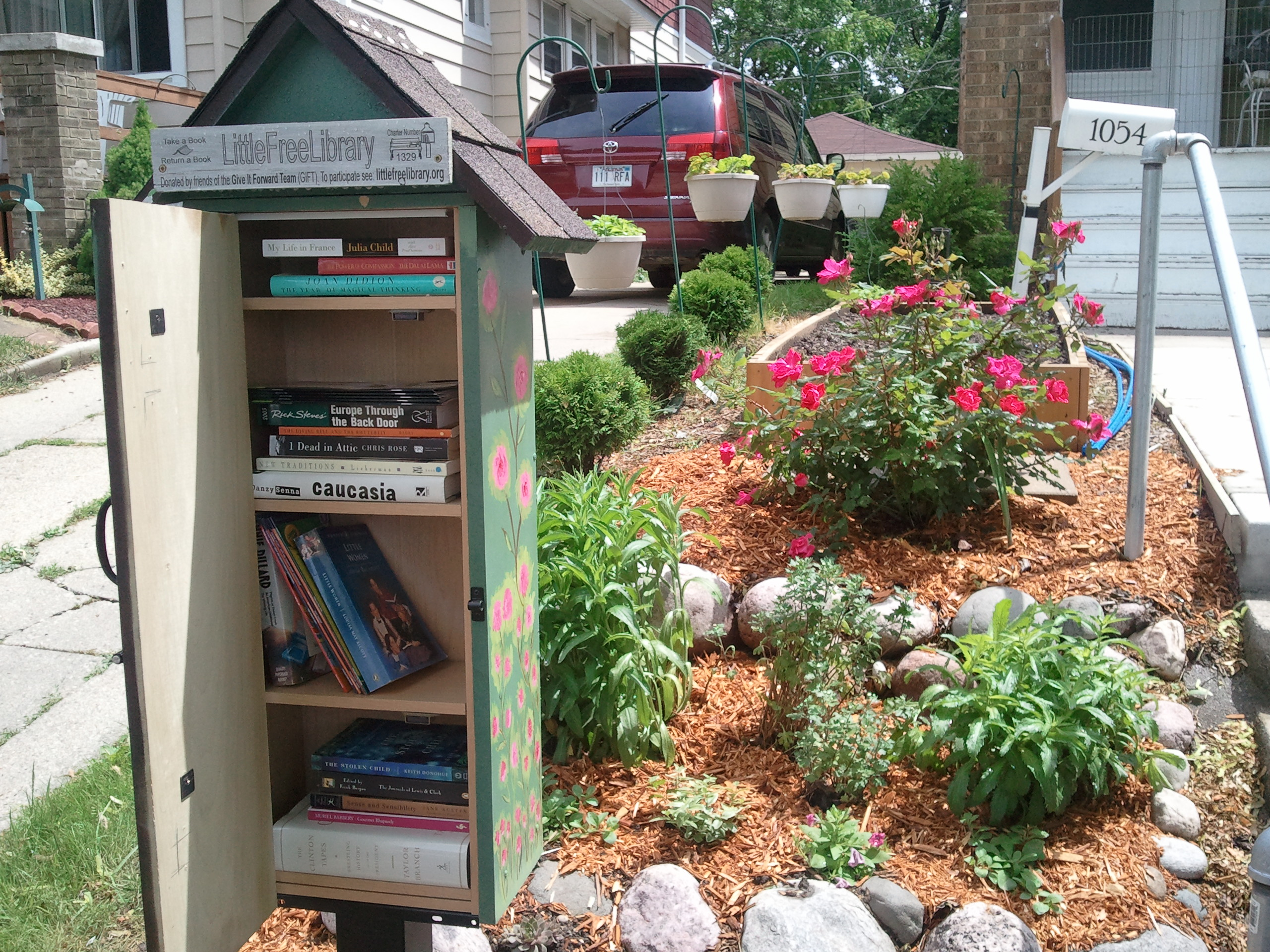
One of the Little Free Libraries in the neighborhood

== See also ==
- History of Milwaukee, Wisconsin
