= Gen. Walter Martin House =

Historic house in New York, United States

- U.S. National Register of Historic Places
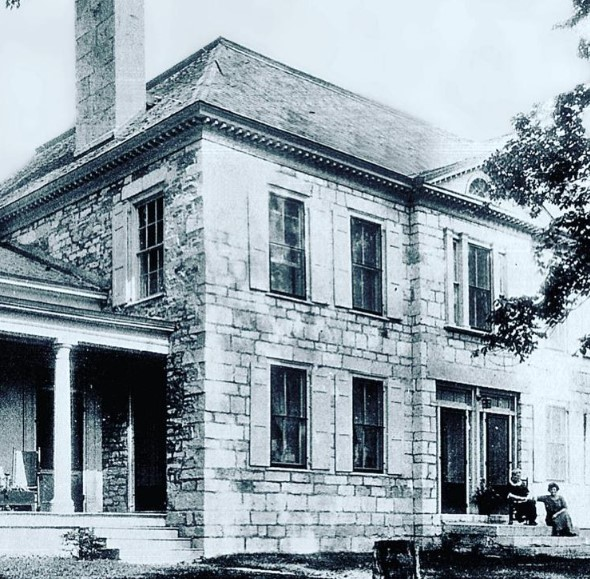

- Location within New York Location within the United States
- Location: 6575 Main St., Martinsburg, New York
- Coordinates: 43°44′16″N 75°28′9″W
- Area: 2.2 acres (0.89 ha)
- Built: 1805
- Architectural style: Federal, Greek Revival
- NRHP reference No.: 08000698
- Added to NRHP: July 24, 2008

Gen. Walter Martin House is a historic home located at Martinsburg in Lewis County, New York.

It was built in 1805 and consists of the original two story, hip roofed, stone Federal main block with Greek Revival wings added about 1835.

The front features a projecting center pavilion surmounted by a triangular pediment.

It was the home of General Walter Martin (1766–1834), founder and namesake of the town of Martinsburg.

It was listed on the National Register of Historic Places in 2008.
