= Walter Martin (general) =

American politician (1764–1834)

Member of the New York Senate from the Western district
- In office July 1, 1808 – July 1, 1812 Serving with Francis A. Bloodgood, Luther Rich, Sylvanus Smalley
- Preceded by: multi-member district
- Succeeded by: multi-member district

Personal details
- Born: December 15, 1764 Sturbridge, Massachusetts, U.S.
- Died: December 10, 1834 (aged 69) Martinsburg, New York, U.S.
- Resting place: Martinsburg Cemetery, Martinsburg
- Party: Democratic-Republican
- Spouses: Sarah Turner (died 1815); Sarah Granger (m. 1816; died 1824)
- Children: with Sarah Turner; Jane Ann (Leonard)^{(b. 1788; died 1871)}; Susanna (Safford)^{(b. 1792; died 1818)}; Walter Martin^{(b. 1794; died 1864)}; Adam Martin^{(b. 1796; died 1826)}; John Williams Martin^{(b. 1800; died 1881)}; Charles Lee Martin^{(b. 1802; died 1868)}; Morgan Lewis Martin^{(b. 1805; died 1887)}; David Thomas Martin^{(b. 1807; died 1878)}; Mary Martin^{(b. 1812; died 1813)}; with Sarah Granger; Mary B. (Robinson)^{(b. 1820; died 1852)}
- Parents: Adam Martin (father); Abigail (Cheney) Martin (mother)
- Relatives: James Duane Doty (nephew); Asa Fitch Jr. (nephew); David Thomas (brother-in-law)

Military service
- Allegiance: United States
- Branch/service: New York Militia
- Years of service: 1780s 1800s–1810s
- Rank: Brig. General
- Battles/wars: War of 1812

Walter Martin (December 15, 1764 – December 10, 1834) was an American politician and New York pioneer. With his father, Adam Martin, he was the founder and namesake of Martinsburg, New York, and represented western New York in the New York Senate from 1808 to 1812. He was also a brigadier general of the New York militia, and served as quartermaster of the militia during the War of 1812.

He was the father of Morgan Lewis Martin and uncle of James Duane Doty, who went on to become two of the founding fathers of the state of Wisconsin.

== Biography ==
Walter Martin was born in Sturbridge, Massachusetts, in 1764. As a young man, he served in the New York militia under his father, Colonel Adam Martin, in the years after the conclusion of the American Revolutionary War. In the late 1780s, he moved with his father to Salem, New York, where they operated a store and tavern and owned several water-powered mills.

In 1801, they sold out all of their mills and property in the Salem area to Dr. Asa Fitch—the husband of Martin's sister. Martin used those profits to purchase an 8000-acre tract of land in what was then Oneida County, New York, intent on beginning his own settlement in the area. By 1803, he had attracted a number of other settlers and investors, including his father, and established a township he named Martinsburg. Martin retained the water rights in the town, and used them to construct mills for wool, lumber, and grain. Early after their arrival, they began constructing a stone mansion now known as the Gen. Walter Martin House, which remained his primary residence for the rest of his life.

Martin also immediately began advocating for the establishment of a new county from their section of Oneida County, and succeeded in 1805 with the establishment of Lewis County. Martin also successfully maneuvered to have Martinsburg made the county seat by donating land and money for a courthouse.

In 1805, Martin was also instrumental in the organizing of a brigade of militia, composed of companies from Lewis, Jefferson, and St. Lawrence counties; this was designated the 26th brigade of New York militia, but referred to during these years as "Martin's brigade".

Martin was elected to the New York Senate in the spring of 1808, for a four-year term, running on the Democratic-Republican ticket.

After the outbreak of the War of 1812 Martin was designated quartermaster of the New York militia.

For roughly his entire residence at Martinsburg, Martin was the postmaster there, serving about 30 years. He died at his home in Martinsburg on December 10, 1834.

== Personal life and family ==
Walter Martin was the only son among the six children born to Colonel Adam Martin (1739–1818) and his wife Abigail (née Cheney; 1740–1820). Adam Martin was an officer in the American provincial militia during the French and Indian War, and later served as a captain in the 15th Massachusetts Regiment during the American Revolutionary War. After the war, he was a colonel in the New York militia and served in the New York State Assembly. The Martin family were descended from the colonist Thomas Martin Sr., who emigrated from England to the Massachusetts Bay Colony in the mid-1600s.

Walter Martin married Sarah Turner on June 12, 1787, at Goshen, New York. They had at least eight children together, though at least one child died in infancy. Sarah Turner died on August 14, 1815. The following year Martin married Sarah "Sally" Granger, with whom he had one more daughter.

Martin's most notable offspring was his fifth son, Morgan Lewis Martin, who went west to the Wisconsin Territory and became one of the founding fathers of the state of Wisconsin.
