= Martinsburg Town Hall =

- U.S. National Register of Historic Places
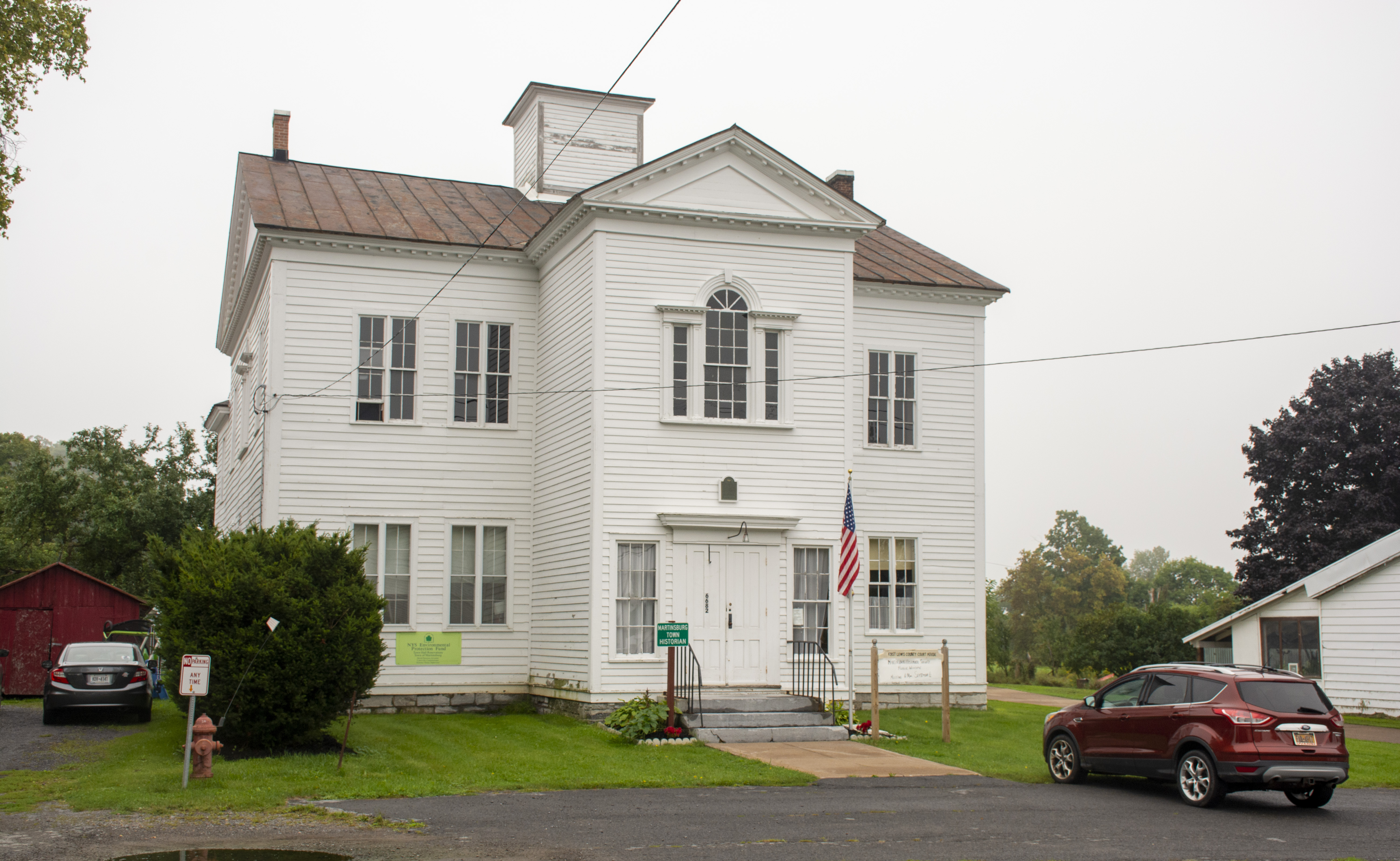

- Location within New York Location within the United States
- Interactive map showing the location for Martinsburg Town Hall
- Location: NY 26 Main St., E Martinsburg, New York
- Coordinates: 43°44′14″N 75°28′8″W
- Area: less than one acre
- Built: 1812
- Architectural style: Federal, Italianate
- NRHP reference No.: 01000241
- Added to NRHP: March 21, 2001

Martinsburg Town Hall, also known as First Lewis County Courthouse, is a historic town hall located at Martinsburg in Lewis County, New York. It was built in 1812 as Lewis County Courthouse and is the oldest public building in Lewis County. It is a 2 1/2-story, clapboard-sided, Georgian-inspired, Federal-period building with architecturally sensitive Victorian-period alterations. Italianate-style alterations were carried out in 1870 and included the pedimented projecting pavilion with palladian window. It was at this time the building was used as the Martin Institute; in the 1890s it became the town hall.

It was listed on the National Register of Historic Places in 2001.
