= Turin (disambiguation) =

Turin is the capital city of the Metropolitan City of Turin and the Piedmont Region, in north-west Italy. Turin may also refer to the following:

== Places ==
- Turin, Alberta, Canada; a hamlet
- Turin, Idlib, Syria; a village
- Turín, El Salvador, town in the Ahuachapán Department

=== Italy ===
- Province of Turin, former province in the Piedmont region of Italy
- March of Turin, a medieval country around the city of Turin
- Roman Catholic Archdiocese of Turin, Italy
- Metropolitan City of Turin

=== United States ===
- Turin, Georgia
- Turin, Iowa
- Turin, New York
- Turin (village), New York
- Turin Township, Michigan

== People ==
- Turin, or Tarin, alternative spellings for the Pashtun tribe Tareen
- Duke of Turin

=== Persons ===
- Dave Turin, a gold miner featured in the Gold Rush television series
- George L. Turin (1930-2014) U.S. computer scientist
- John J. Turin (1913-1973), American physicist
- Luca Turin (b. 1953), biophysicist and proponent of the vibration theory of olfaction
- Mark Turin (b. 1973), linguistic anthropologist
- Niels Turin Nielsen (1887-1964) Danish gymnast

=== Fictional characters ===
- Túrin Turambar, a character in J. R. R. Tolkien's Middle-earth

== Facilities and structures ==
- Turin Airport (disambiguation)
- Refuge Turin, a high mountain refuge
- Turin Cathedral, Turin, Italy
- Observatory of Turin, astronomical observatory
- International University College of Turin, Turin, Italy
- The Turin, NYC, NYS, USA; an apartment building

== Events ==
- Battle of Turin (disambiguation) including Siege of Turin
- Turin Auto Show, notable automobile show held in Turin, Italy, from 1900–2000
- Turin International, 1911 World's Fair
- 2006 Winter Olympics (Torino 2006) Turin, Italy
- 2006 Winter Paralympics (Torino 2006) Turin, Italy

== Other uses ==
- Epyc Turin, codename for a series of server CPUs from AMD
- Treaty of Turin (disambiguation)
- Shroud of Turin, cloth that allegedly covered the dead Jesus of Nazareth
- Turin, an alternative name for the Italian wine grape Dolcetto and the French wine grape Douce noir
- Turin King List, list of ancient pharaohs

== See also ==
- Turin, New York (disambiguation)
- Torino (disambiguation)
