= Turin, New York (disambiguation) =

Turin, New York may refer to:

- Turin (town), New York, located in Lewis County
- Turin (village), New York, located within the Town of Turin
- The Turin, a pre-war luxury apartment building in New York City.
