= Salmon River (New York) =

River in the United States

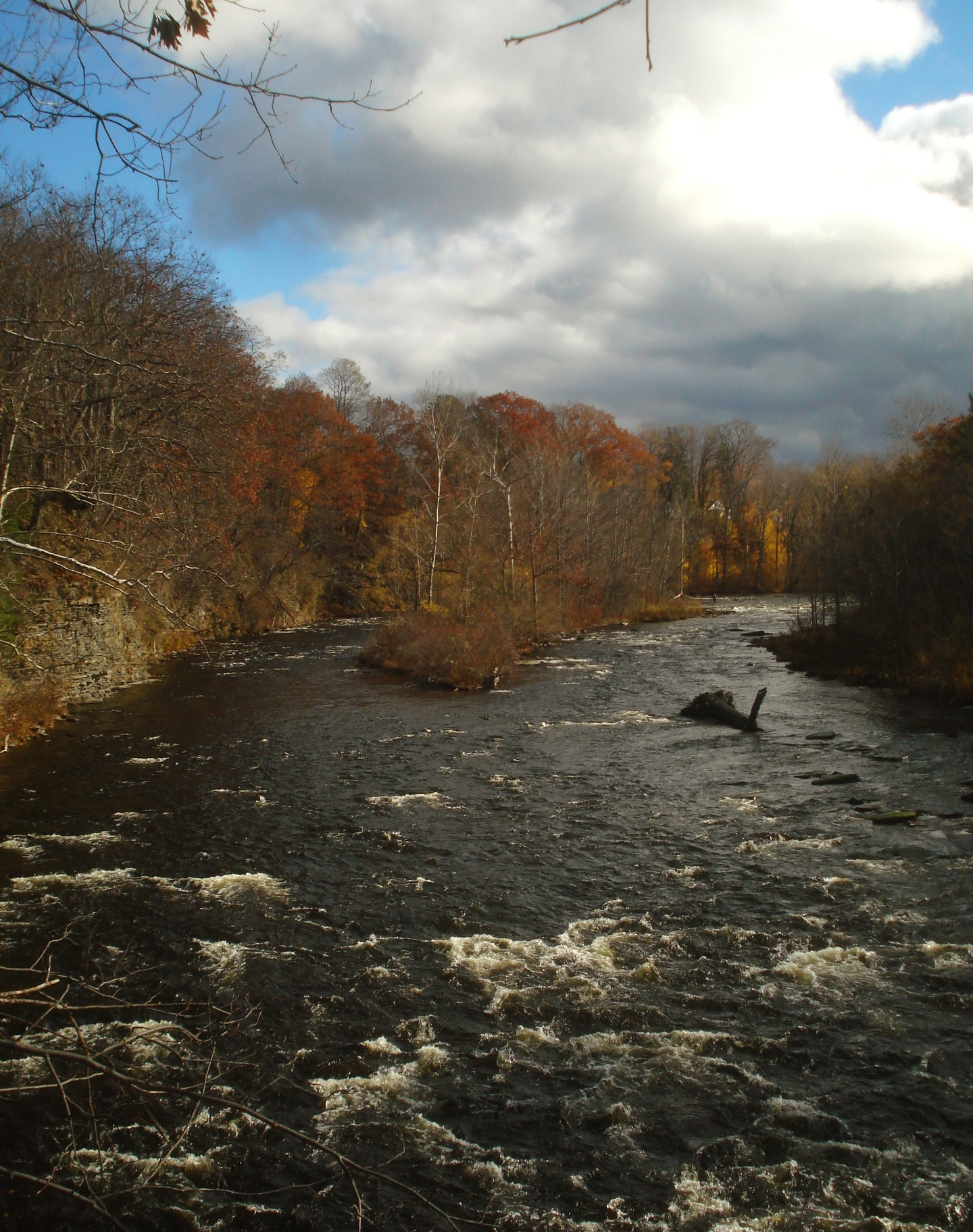
- View of the Salmon River as it passes through Pulaski, November 2009

- Location of the mouth of the Salmon River in New York State Salmon River (New York) (the United States)

Location
- Country: United States
- State: New York
- Region: Upstate New York

Physical characteristics
- Source: Tug Hill
  - location: Town of Montague, Lewis County
  - coordinates: 43°41′34″N 75°41′15″W
  - elevation: 579 m (1,900 ft)
- Mouth: Lake Ontario
  - location: Port Ontario, Town of Richland, Oswego County
  - coordinates: 43°34′32″N 76°12′14″W
  - elevation: 76.2 m (250 ft)
- Length: 71 km (44 mi)
- Basin size: 725 km^{2} (280 sq mi)
- Discharge
  - location: Pineville, New York
  - average: 781 cu ft/s (22.1 m^{3}/s)
  - minimum: 64 cu ft/s (1.8 m^{3}/s); August 21, 1995
  - maximum: 24,000 cu ft/s (680 m^{3}/s); December 29, 1984

Basin features
- Tributaries
  - left: East Branch Salmon River, Beaverdam Brook
  - right: North Branch Salmon River, Mad River, Orwell Brook, Trout Brook
- Waterfalls: Salmon River Falls

The Salmon River is a small river north of Syracuse in Upstate New York, the United States. It is a popular and economically important sportfishing destination, and the most heavily fished of New York's Lake Ontario tributaries. From its headwaters in the Tug Hill region of New York, it flows 44 miles (71 km) westward through two hydroelectric dams and over the 110-foot (34 m) Salmon River Falls before it empties into eastern Lake Ontario at Port Ontario in Oswego County. The Salmon River watershed drains approximately 280 square miles (730 km^{2}).

The river is noted for its recreational salmon fishery, which is sustained by the efforts of the Salmon River Fish Hatchery, located north of Altmar on a tributary to the Salmon River. Hatchery staff raise over three million young trout and salmon each year to be stocked in streams and lakes throughout New York State, including the Salmon River itself.

The Salmon River derives its name from the landlocked Atlantic salmon which were of great importance to Native Americans and early settlers of the region. However, these native salmon were extirpated from the river by 1872 and from Lake Ontario by 1898. Since the late 1960s, the Salmon River has been stocked primarily with Chinook salmon, coho salmon, steelhead, and brown trout, in addition to a smaller proportion of Atlantic salmon. These fish return to the river for annual spawning runs after spending a majority of the year in Lake Ontario.

The river is also a popular location for kayaking and river rafting during parts of the year when water from the Lighthouse Hill Dam is released, with several companies making excursions to the river.

== Course ==
The Salmon River includes several distinct reaches and features between its headwaters and mouth.

=== Headwaters and upper tributaries ===
The headwaters of the Salmon River are located in western Lewis County, within New York's Tug Hill region. The primary upper tributaries of the Salmon River are the North Branch Salmon River (itself fed by the Mad River) and East Branch Salmon River. The river's upper reaches are heavily forested and sparsely populated, allowing for the water quality of the river to be extremely high.

=== Salmon River Reservoir ===
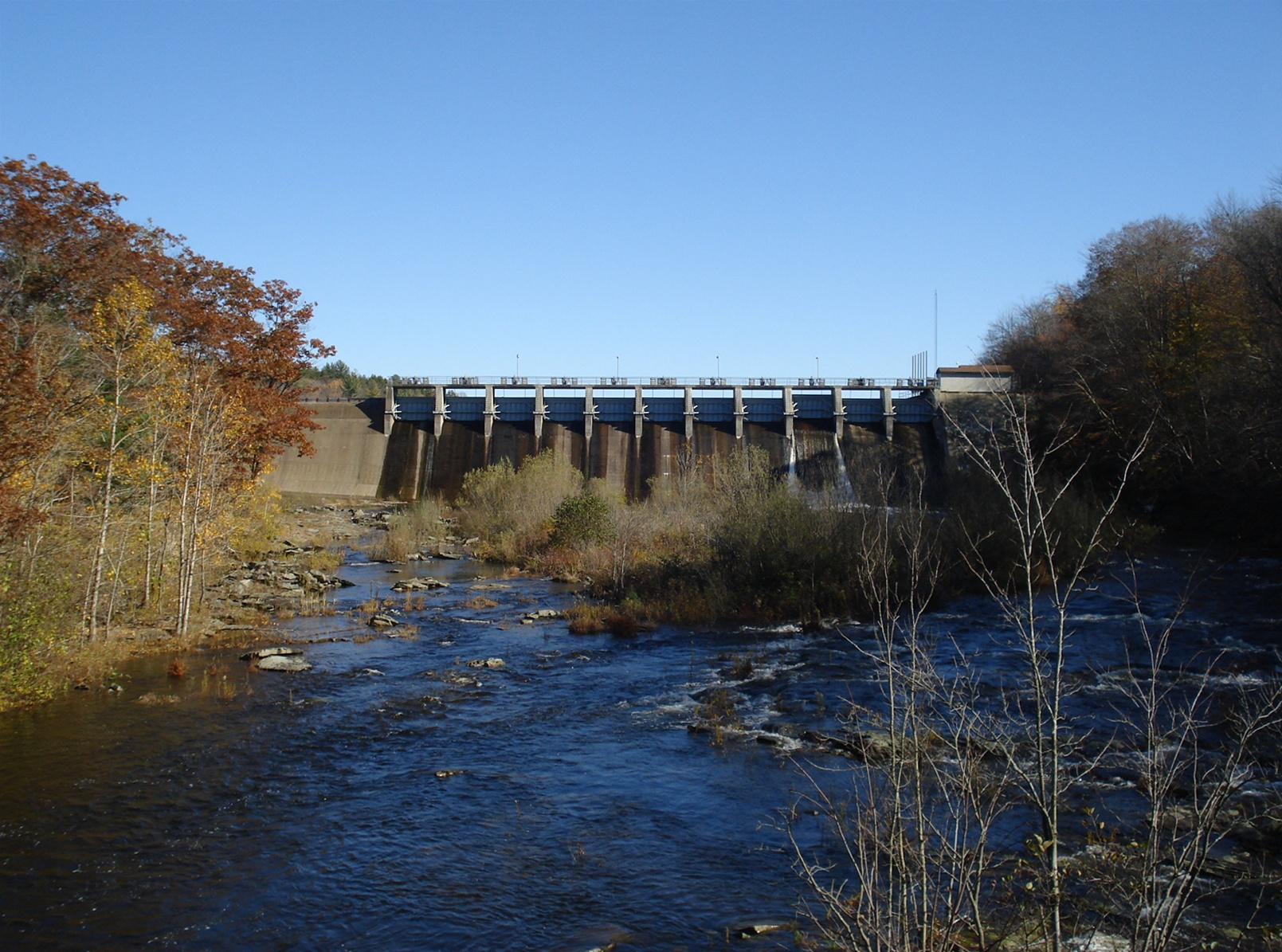
View of the dam that impounds the upper Salmon River Reservoir, October 2008.

The Salmon River Reservoir, also known as the Redfield Reservoir, is a 6.9-mile-long (11.1 km) man-made waterbody in Oswego County (43°32′06″N 75°51′32″W). The reservoir was created with the completion of a hydroelectric dam in 1912. It covers an area of 2,660 acres (10.8 km^{2}) with a maximum depth of 50 feet (15 m) and has the capacity to hold 56,000 acre-feet (69,000,000 m^{3}) of water. It is the larger of the Salmon River's two reservoirs.

=== Salmon River Falls ===
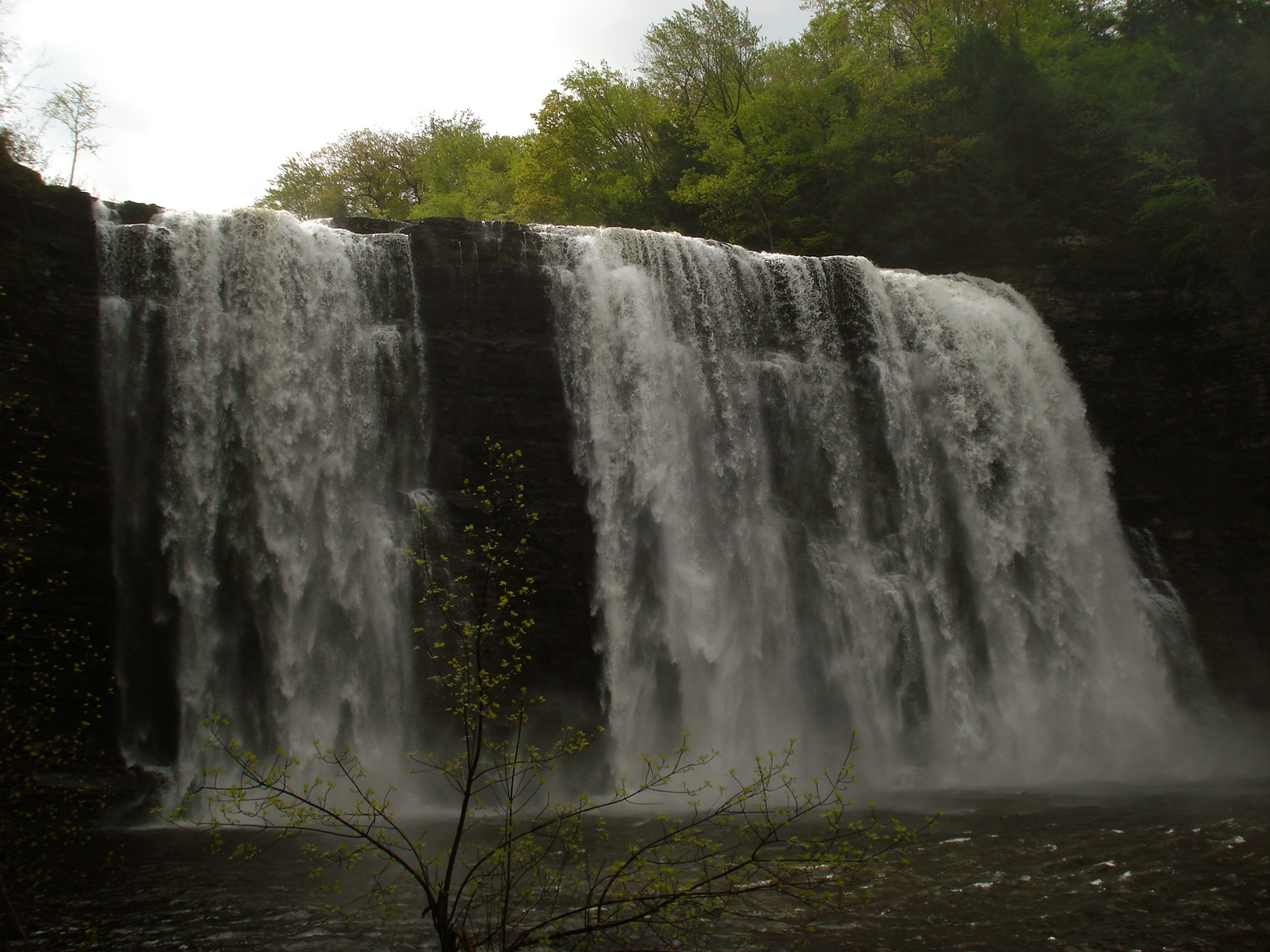
Salmon River Falls, May 2009

The Salmon River Falls is a 110-foot (34 m) waterfall in Oswego County, located approximately 15 miles inland from the river's confluence with Lake Ontario and between the Salmon River's two reservoirs. It is situated within the 112-acre (0.45 km^{2}) Salmon River Falls Unique Area, managed by the New York State Department of Environmental Conservation. The falls and surrounding land was owned by the Niagara Mohawk power company prior to 1993, when ownership was transferred to New York State. The area has since been improved with parking areas, wheelchair-accessible trails, and interpretive kiosks, and is a popular sightseeing destination in the region. Historically, the falls were the natural upstream limit for spawning salmon in the river prior to the construction of the Lighthouse Hill Dam.

=== Lighthouse Hill Reservoir ===
The Lighthouse Hill Reservoir, also known as the Lower Salmon River Reservoir, is located in Oswego County near Altmar, about three miles (4.8 km) downstream of the Salmon River Reservoir (43°31′30″N 75°57′54″W). The 164-acre (0.66 km^{2}) reservoir was created with the completion of the Lighthouse Hill Dam in 1930, which currently represents the first barrier to upstream migration for salmon and trout.

=== Main stem ===
The Salmon River's main stem stretches for 16 miles (26 km) below the Lighthouse Hill Dam before it reaches the river's mouth at Lake Ontario, passing through Altmar and Pulaski on the way. This portion of the river is directly accessible by river-running salmon from Lake Ontario, and consequently, this is the stretch of the river that is most heavily utilized by anglers. The amount of water flowing in the river's main stem is controlled by the Lighthouse Hill Dam, including summertime recreational releases of water to enhance whitewater rafting opportunities.

Two tributaries, Trout Brook and Orwell Brook, enter the river below the dam and are also accessible to migrating salmon and trout, where they are actively sought by anglers. Salmon may also run up a third tributary, Beaverdam Brook, however fishing is restricted on that stream due to its association with the Salmon River Fish Hatchery. The hatchery connects to the stream, where it directly takes in broodstock and releases juvenile hatchery-raised fish.

== Geology ==
The Salmon River passes through a region with sedimentary bedrock composed of limestone, shale, siltstone and sandstone. After the uplifting of the Appalachian Plateau approximately 220 million years ago, numerous streams in the area, including the Salmon River and its tributaries, began to cut gorges (locally known as "gulfs") through the bedrock. The geologically recent Pleistocene glaciations further influenced the landscape approximately 12,000 years ago; the region's soils in particular are the result of deposits of glacial till from this time. Soils in the Salmon River region are generally stony, acidic, and poorly drained.

== History ==
=== General history ===
Prior to European colonization, the Salmon River and its surrounding area was important to the Iroquois Confederacy as seasonal hunting and fishing grounds. Among their names for the river was Heh-hah-wa-gah, meaning "where swim the sweet fish". Additional names included A-han-ha-ge, Ca-no-ha-ge (meaning "a creek" or "river"), Otihatangue (meaning "a large clearing", referring to natural meadows near the river's mouth), and Ga-hen-we-gah. The river also served as passage to interior hunting grounds, and was described in 1688 as "the place where the greater part of the Iroqouis embarked to go upon the trail of the beaver", in reference to their excursions into the Lesser Wilderness, now known as the Tug Hill.

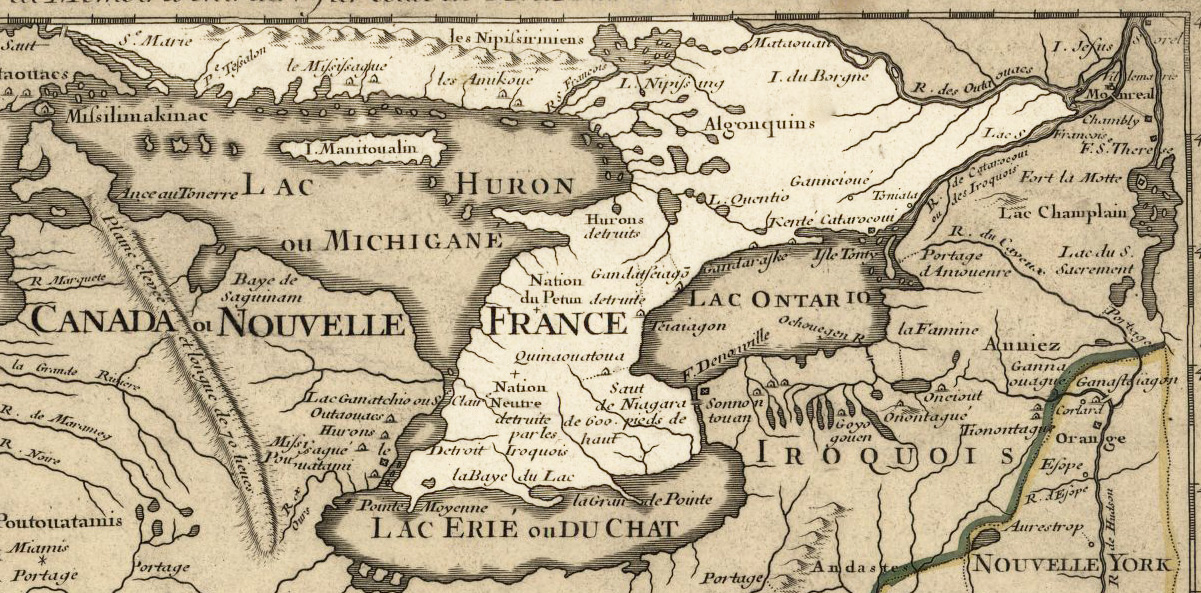
Portion of Guillaume de l'Isle's Carte de la Louisiane et du cours du Mississipi from 1718 showing the eastern Great Lakes region. La Famine, the French name for the Salmon River, is shown near the southeastern corner of Lake Ontario.

In 1615, French explorer Samuel de Champlain and Jesuit missionaries, including Simon Le Moyne, explored the river and the surrounding area, which would be claimed as part of New France. Early maps and accounts refer to the river by its French name of La Famine, a name referencing the hunger of French colonists who passed through the area in 1656; an Iroquois settlement known as Cahihonovage (or Cahihonovague) was also on noted on its south shore, near present-day Port Ontario. La Famine was described as a "well-known stopping-place upon the eastern shore of Lake Ontario for the weary hunter and the bold explorer, and the spot where even armies encamped, and the ambassadors of hostile nations met in solemn council."

Records from Jesuit missionaries as early as 1657 make note of Iroquois fishermen taking large quantities of Atlantic salmon from the river, which would then be dried or smoked to preserve it for the upcoming winter. One early source observed that the river contained so many salmon that the Iroquois "often brought up a hundred at one cast of the net."

The Salmon River at this time was noted for its natural harbor and abundance of fish. As such, the lower river was contested between the French, British and Iroquois during the French and Indian Wars from 1688 to 1763; ultimately the British would hold control of the region following these conflicts. Their control was short-lived, however, as the United States gained its independence from Great Britain following the American Revolution in 1783; the region's Iroquois were also substantially weakened, having suffered losses due to siding with the British during this time.

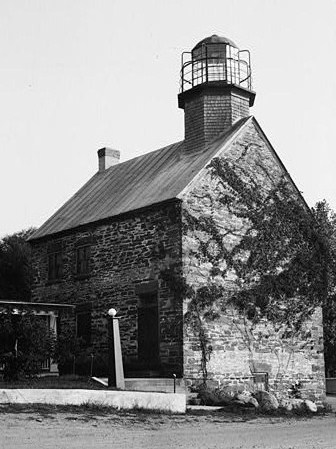
Selkirk Lighthouse, near the mouth of the Salmon River, was built in 1837.

The first permanent American settlement in the area was built by Nathan Tuttle and Nathan Wilcox in 1801 near the mouth of the Salmon River. Upstream, what was to become the village of Pulaski began as a single log cabin constructed in 1804 by Benjamin Winch. The stone Selkirk Lighthouse was built near the river's mouth in 1838 and survives to this day; the lighthouse served both to aid navigation along the Lake Ontario shore, and as a location to collect tariffs on items imported from Canada.

The river has historically served as a source of both food and hydro-power, and numerous dams and mills were built along the river during the 1800s. Though these dams served the needs of the growing human population along the river, they also impeded movement of salmon seeking access to upstream spawning grounds, and they contributed to the eventual extirpation of landlocked Atlantic salmon from the river by 1872.

In 1847, residents of the region filed proposed legislation to separate from Oswego County and form "Salmon County" with Pulaski as the county seat. The legislation did not advance beyond the initial filing in the New York State Assembly.

The Salmon River underwent extensive changes in the early 1900s with the construction of hydroelectric dams and their associated reservoirs. Between 1912 and 1930, dams and reservoirs were constructed both upstream and downstream of the Salmon River Falls.

A major flood occurred along the Salmon River and its tributaries between December 29, 1984 and January 2, 1985. Rapid snowmelt combined with heavy rainfall (as much as 6.90 inches [17.5 cm] near the Salmon River's headwaters) caused extensive flood damage along the river, destroying bridges near Redfield and Osceola and damaging roads, bridges and homes in Pulaski and Altmar.

On September 30, 2010, large amounts of rain fell within a matter of several hours in the Salmon River drainage area, ranging from 2.66 to 6.51 inches (6.8 to 16.5 cm), causing historic flooding. The water was so high that the "Short Bridge" in the center of downtown Pulaski was nearly overtopped by the high water, and a portion of a retaining wall on the north side of the river directly downstream from the bridge was washed away. During the flood, 26,000 cubic feet per second (cfs) of water was reported as flowing through the river; this was only slightly less than the massive flood event in 1984, which saw 29,000 cfs of water rushing through the river. River levels during early fall are typically between 350 and 700 cfs. There were reports and photos of salmon seen swimming in flooded parking lots and roads, and of anglers targeting these fish.

=== History of fisheries management ===
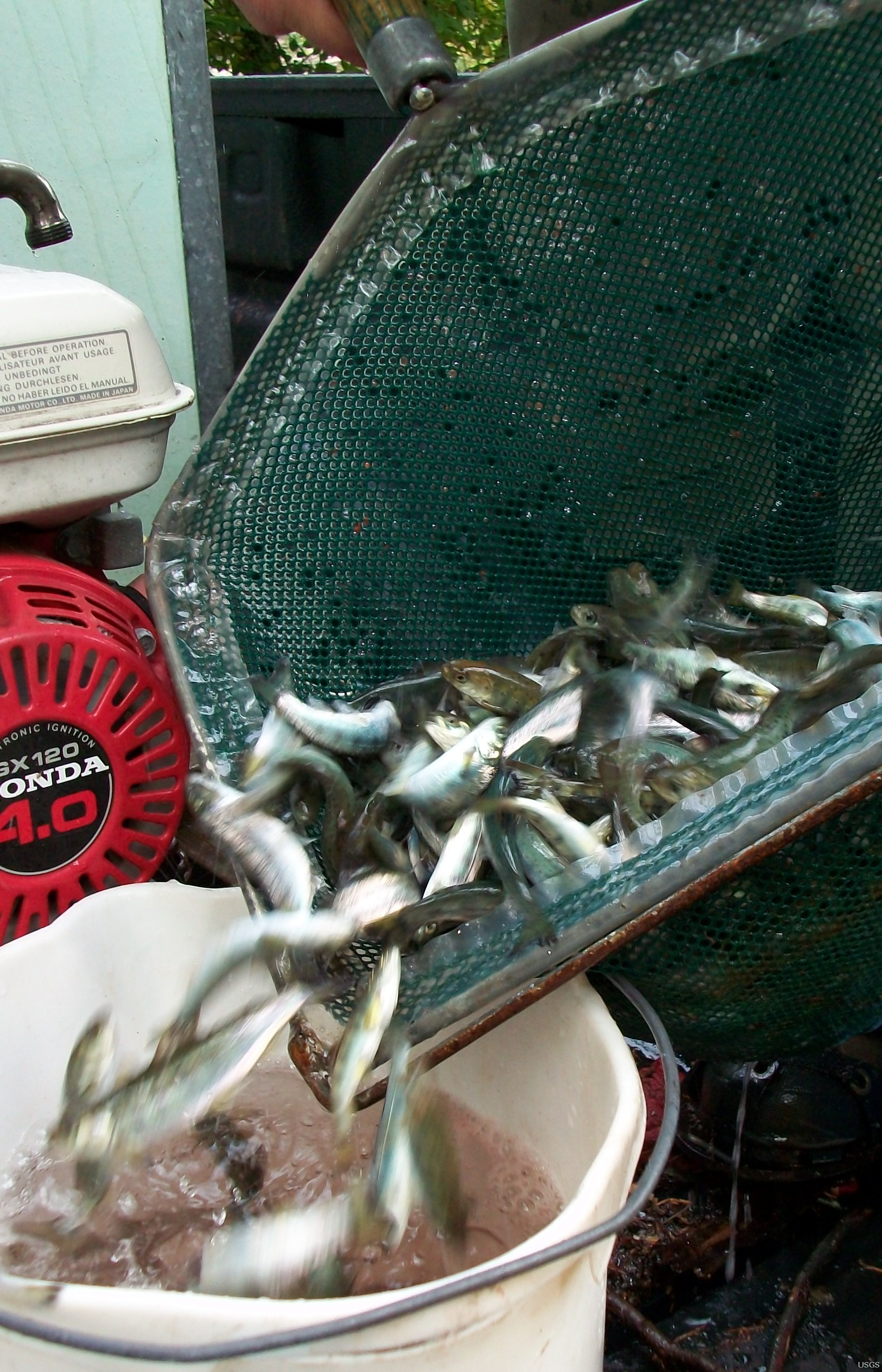
Young Atlantic salmon are transferred to buckets just prior to release into the Salmon River in September 2011.

Salmon River Atlantic salmon populations declined rapidly in the mid-19th century due to overfishing, pollution, and the construction of numerous dams preventing access to spawning grounds. By 1872, these native salmon were extirpated from the river. Between 1873 and 1898, approximately 1.1 million Chinook salmon were stocked in the Salmon River; however stocking ceased once it was demonstrated that no natural reproduction of these salmon was taking place. This same period of time saw the stocking of 144,000 Atlantic salmon fry, however poor survival of these fish led to this program being discontinued as well. By 1898, all salmon in Lake Ontario were apparently extirpated.

Several additional attempts to establish spawning populations of Chinook, coho and Atlantic salmon in the river took place between 1939 and 1959. In each instance, failure to document subsequent natural reproduction led to each program being discontinued. Poor river conditions, pollution, and the impacts of parasitic sea lampreys contributed to the failure of these stocking programs.

The extirpation of lake trout from Lake Ontario in the 1950s left the large lake without an apex predator, leaving prey fish such as alewife and smelt with no natural means of control. Alewife populations exploded, sometimes to the point of causing die-offs large enough to require the use of bulldozers along Great Lakes' beaches. Seeking to control prey fish populations, the aggressive stocking of coho and Chinook salmon resumed throughout the Great Lakes and their tributaries.

In 1968, 22,000 coho salmon were stocked in the Salmon River, marking the beginning of the current era of salmon sportfishing on the river. Chinook salmon were stocked beginning in 1970. Initial returns were poor, and would remain so until successful sea lamprey control began in 1972. By 1974, large salmon runs were observed regularly in the Salmon River, and steelhead were initially stocked beginning in that year as well.

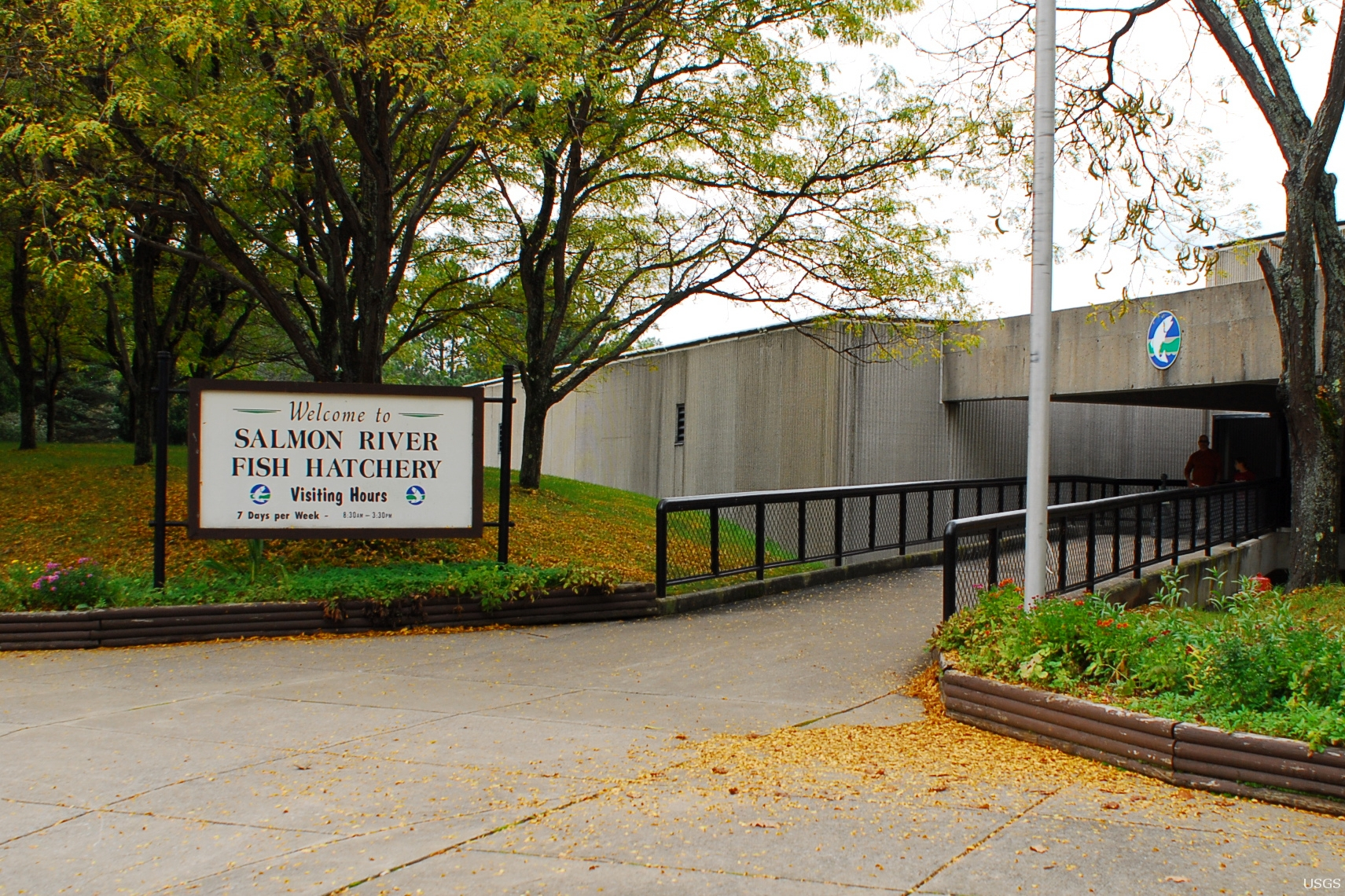
The Salmon River Fish Hatchery opened in 1980.

To support the growing Lake Ontario sportfishing industry, the Salmon River Fish Hatchery was built in 1980 on Beaverdam Brook, a tributary to the Salmon River near Altmar. The hatchery receives its Chinook, coho and steelhead broodstock directly from river-running fish that are allowed directly into the hatchery. The facility also raises brown trout and Atlantic salmon using eggs received from other facilities. In total, the hatchery raises nearly three million young fish for release into New York's waters each year.

Fishing regulations and stocking levels have changed throughout the years in response to prey fish abundance, habitat conditions, and social pressure. Between 1976 and 1977, possession of salmon caught in Lake Ontario or its tributaries was banned due to elevated levels of chemical contaminants such as Mirex and PCBs. In 1995, the practice of snagging was banned due to ethical concerns and social problems on the river (see Snagging ban section below).

For many years, flow rates in the river's main stem below the Lighthouse Hill Dam changed frequently and dramatically as water was released in response to variable demands for electricity. The 1996 Federal Energy Regulatory Commission's re-licensing agreement for hydroelectric power generation on the river regulated river flows, with the goal of improving the river's natural habitat. Managed flows led to significant increases in natural reproduction of Chinook salmon within the river, and enhanced the recreational appeal of the river through planned high-water releases that provide opportunities for white-water rafting throughout the summer.

The stocking of Atlantic salmon resumed in the Salmon River in 1995. Small returns several years later established a limited summer fishery. However, it was not until 2009 that successful natural reproduction of Atlantic salmon was observed. This marked the first time naturally reproduced Atlantic salmon were found in the Salmon River in over a century.

In 2015, the Salmon River was stocked with 360,000 Chinook salmon, 90,000 coho salmon, 30,000 Atlantic salmon, 263,220 steelhead, 1,150 rainbow trout, 1,200 brown trout, and 910 brook trout. These numbers include fish released directly from the Salmon River Fish Hatchery into Beaverdam Brook, a tributary of the Salmon River.

== Sportfishing ==
Sportfish of the Salmon River

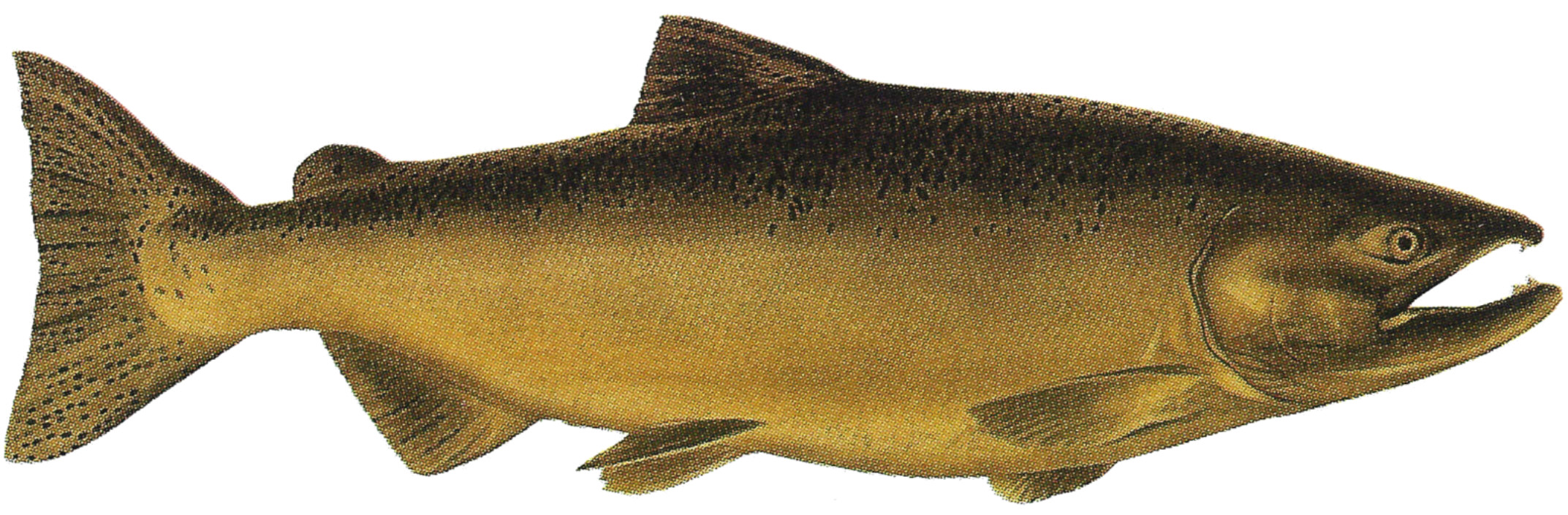
Male spawning-phase chinook salmon

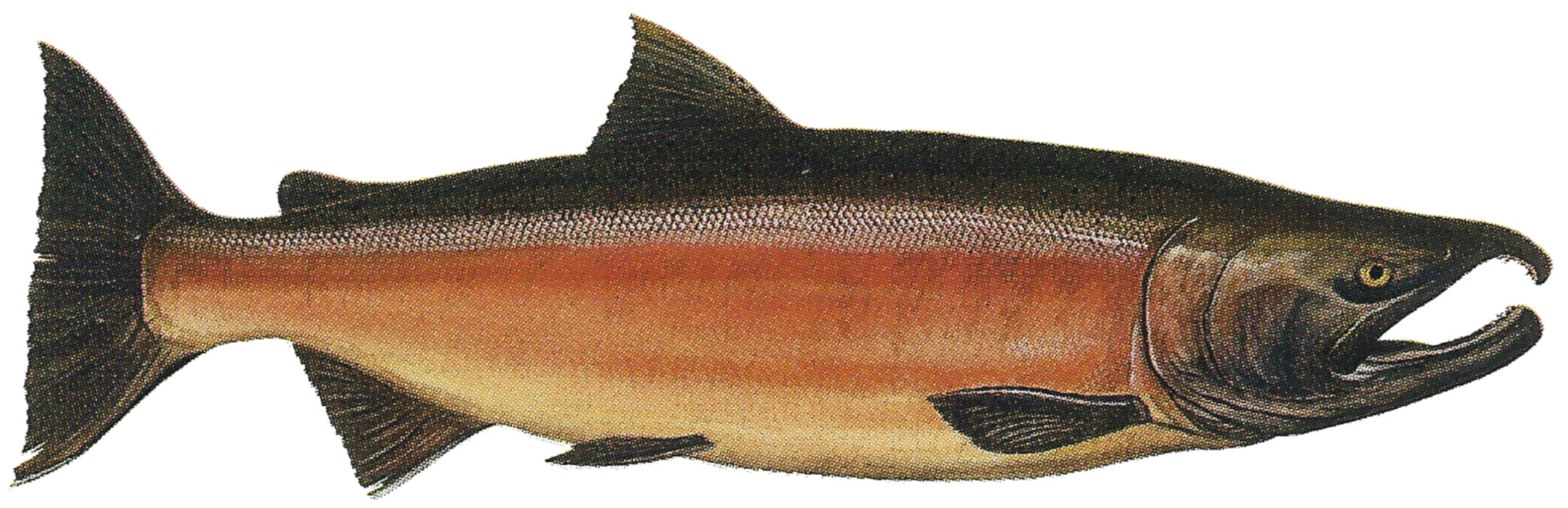
Male spawning-phase coho salmon

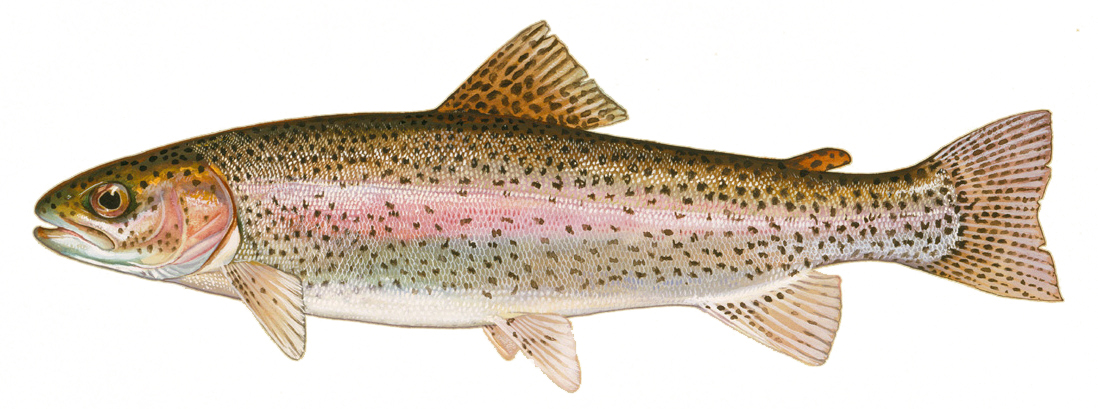
Steelhead trout

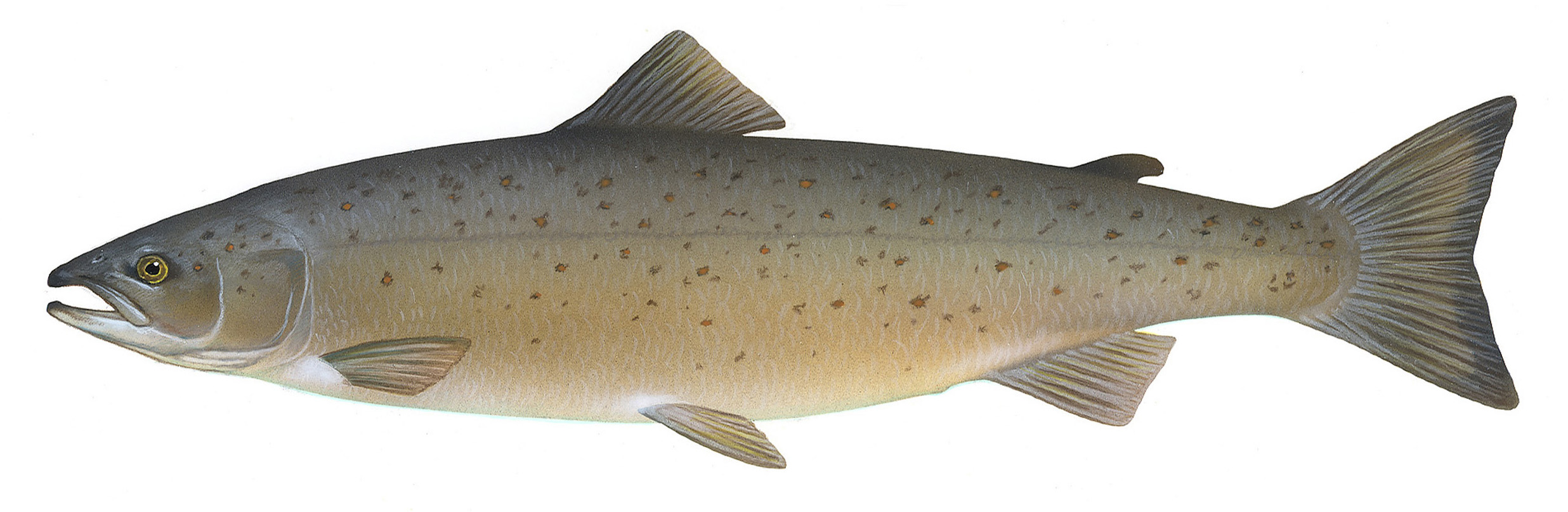
Atlantic salmon

Brown trout

The Salmon River is a popular sportfishing destination, particularly during the fall and early spring months. It was estimated in 2007 that anglers spend nearly $19 million (USD) annually at the Salmon River. More angler effort was expended on the Salmon River during the 2011-2012 season than on all other New York Lake Ontario tributaries combined, with 68% of all tributary fishing activity occurring on the Salmon River. This proportion is rising; the Salmon River accounted for 58% of all effort in 2005-2006 and 64% in 2006-2007. Approximately 60% of anglers on the Salmon River are not residents of the region.

The majority of sportfishing activity on the Salmon River takes place on the portion of the river that stretches between Lake Ontario and the Lighthouse Hill Dam in Altmar. Here, anglers target river-running salmon and trout species that move upstream from the lake in order to spawn. The anadromous sportfish species that comprise these seasonal runs are the Chinook salmon (Oncorhynchus tshawytscha), coho salmon (O. kisutch), brown trout (Salmo trutta), Atlantic salmon (S. salar), and winter and summer-run strains of steelhead (O. mykiss). Salmon fishing on the river is accomplished either by casting from shore, using waders to fish from within the river, or fishing from a drift boat, typically operated by a guide.

The abundance of prey fish in Lake Ontario allow these river-running fish to often attain great size. Two world record fish have been taken from the Salmon River: A 33 lb 4 oz (15.1 kg) coho salmon was landed in 1989, and a 35 lb 8 oz (16.1 kg) Chinook-coho hybrid was caught in 2001. In addition, the current Great Lakes record for a Chinook salmon was taken from the Salmon River in 1991, and weighed in at 47 lb 13 oz (21.7 kg).

=== Angler access ===
Anglers are able to directly access a majority of the lower river due to the presence of conservation easements on otherwise private land, in addition to numerous parking areas and access trails maintained by the New York State Department of Environmental Conservation and local municipalities. Permanent "public fishing rights" easements were secured by New York State on approximately 12 miles (19 km) of the river's shoreline after the divestment of Niagara Mohawk's former land holdings along the river. The easements only allow access for the purpose of fishing; other activities, such as camping and hunting, are not permitted.

Special fly fishing and catch and release-only areas are available above Altmar. Paid-only access is available on the stretch of the river below Pulaski and above the NYS Route 3 bridge in an area where no easements exist, known as the Douglaston Salmon Run.

=== Fall season ===
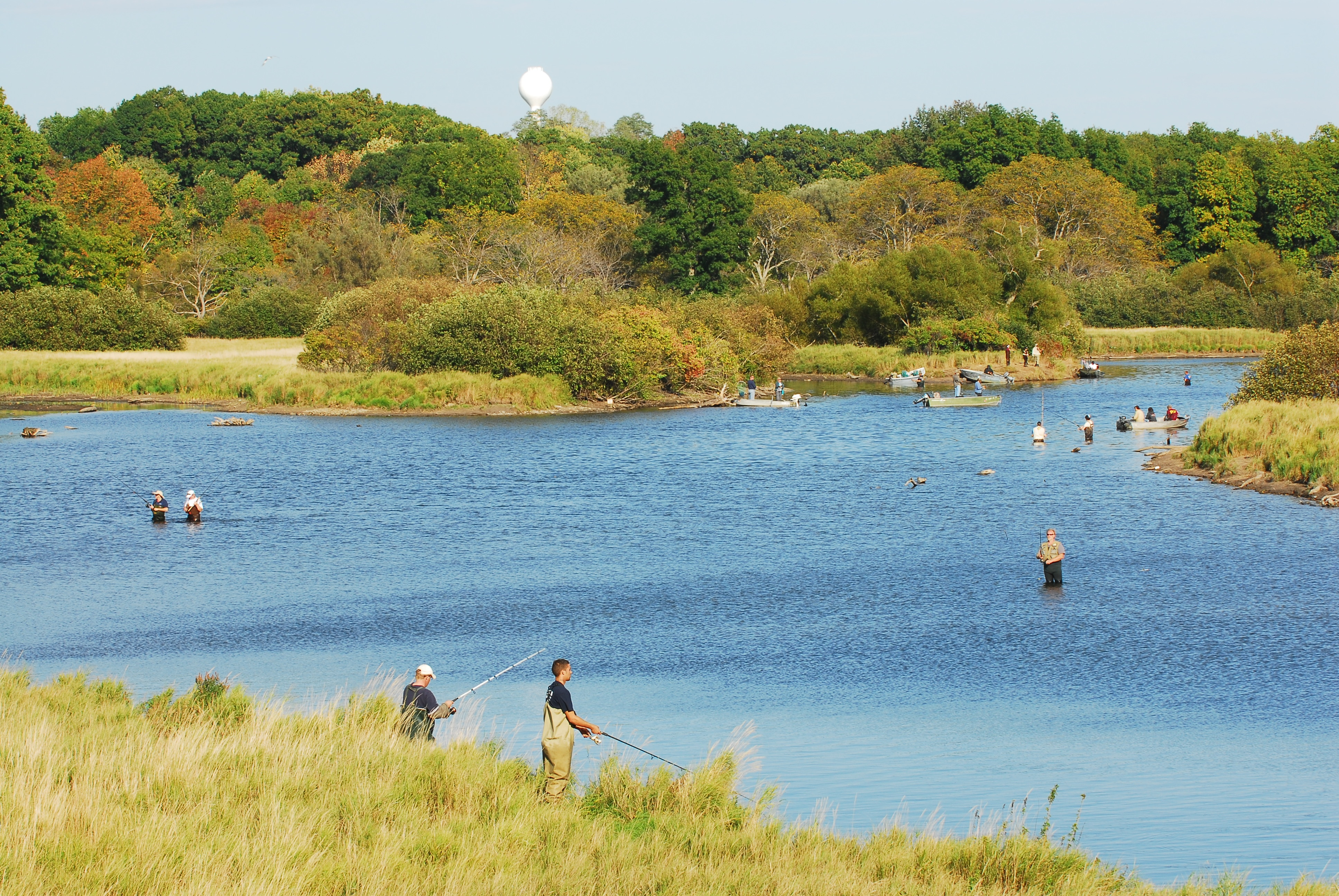
Salmon-seeking anglers on the lower Salmon River near Port Ontario in October 2007.

Fishing activity is greatest during the fall salmon runs, which peak between mid September and early November. During this time, Chinook and coho salmon complete their spawning runs, with the majority of coho usually following the earlier Chinook runs. Both species are semelparous, meaning that they die after spawning. Bait presentation strategies must therefore stimulate the aggressive nature of these fish to provoke them to strike, as they do not feed after entering the river.

Although less prevalent than Chinook and coho salmon, landlocked Atlantic salmon also spawn in the Salmon River during the fall. Most spawn in October and November, though some may enter the river as early as July. These fish are iteroparous, capable of spawning multiple times during their lifespan, and many will return to Lake Ontario after spawning.

=== Winter, spring and summer seasons ===
As the Chinook and coho runs begin to fade, some steelhead and brown trout will begin to enter the river to feed on salmon eggs. Some of these fish will remain in the river throughout the winter before spawning between mid-March and early April, at which time greater numbers of fish will enter the river. Fishing activity on the Salmon River once again peaks during this spring spawning season. Both brown trout and steelhead are capable of spawning multiple times during their lifespan, and many "drop back" to Lake Ontario after spawning; these fish are aggressive feeders and popular targets of anglers.

The stocking of so-called summer-run steelhead (skamania) aims to increase summer trout fishing opportunities on the Salmon River, as these fish tend to enter the river as early as June.

=== Recreational fishing above the main stem ===
Although river-running salmon and trout cannot migrate beyond the Lighthouse Hill Dam, the reservoirs and river stretches beyond the dam are also utilized by anglers, although to a lesser degree than the lower river.

The Lighthouse Hill Reservoir contains gamefish such as resident rainbow trout, largemouth bass and brown trout, in addition to more typical species such as yellow perch, rock bass, brown bullhead, bluegill and pumpkinseed sunfish. The upper Salmon River Reservoir contains both largemouth and smallmouth bass, in addition to some walleye, brown trout, brook trout and rainbow trout; black crappie, yellow perch and bluegill are also present in the reservoir. Above the upper reservoir, the North Branch Salmon River and the Mad River are both annually stocked with brook trout, while the East Branch Salmon River is annually stocked with both rainbow trout and brook trout.

== Regulations ==
Anglers on the Salmon River must abide by New York State's general freshwater fishing regulations, in addition to special regulations that apply only to the main stem of the Salmon River.

=== Snagging ban ===
Snagging, the indiscriminate taking of fish using weighted hooks that are ripped through the water with quick jerking motions, was controversially outlawed on the Salmon River in the early 1990s. It had previously been argued that snagging was ethical due to the difficulty in enticing Chinook and coho salmon to strike, as these fish die after spawning and do not feed once they enter the river. However, proponents of the snagging ban noted that the river also contained several species that survive beyond their spawning seasons, such as steelhead, brown trout and Atlantic salmon; snagging could not possibly avoid impacting these fish as well. In addition, snagging opponents claimed that the practice was unethical as it violated the doctrine of "fair chase", and noted that snagging was associated with both injuries and problematic behavior, such as littering, the targeting of fish merely to harvest their eggs for profit, and fistfights among anglers.

Snagging had been banned on many New York State waters before the early 1990s, however the practice continued on the Salmon River and several other Lake Ontario tributaries due to fears of potential negative economic impacts caused by the ban. One economic impact study predicted that angler effort would decrease by about 25% if a ban was in place. Despite these concerns, New York State went ahead with enacting the ban which eventually became law in 1995.

The popularity of salmon fishing in the general Lake Ontario region did wane in the late 1990s, and the snagging ban may have contributed to this decrease. However, the 2000s saw a revival in the popularity of salmon fishing on the Salmon River, and today the river is once again among the most heavily fished streams in all of New York State. In addition, the level of sportsmanship and the general atmosphere along the Salmon River is described as having improved since the ban was put in place.

Although the snagging ban has been in place for more than 20 years, some illegal snagging activities still persist on the river. Enforcement of the ban is a major priority for Environmental Conservation Officers who patrol the river during peak salmon season, sometimes using stealth and undercover techniques to catch snaggers in the act.

== See also ==
- Little Salmon River (Lake Ontario)
- List of rivers of New York
