= Whetstone Gulf State Park =

State park in Lewis County, New York

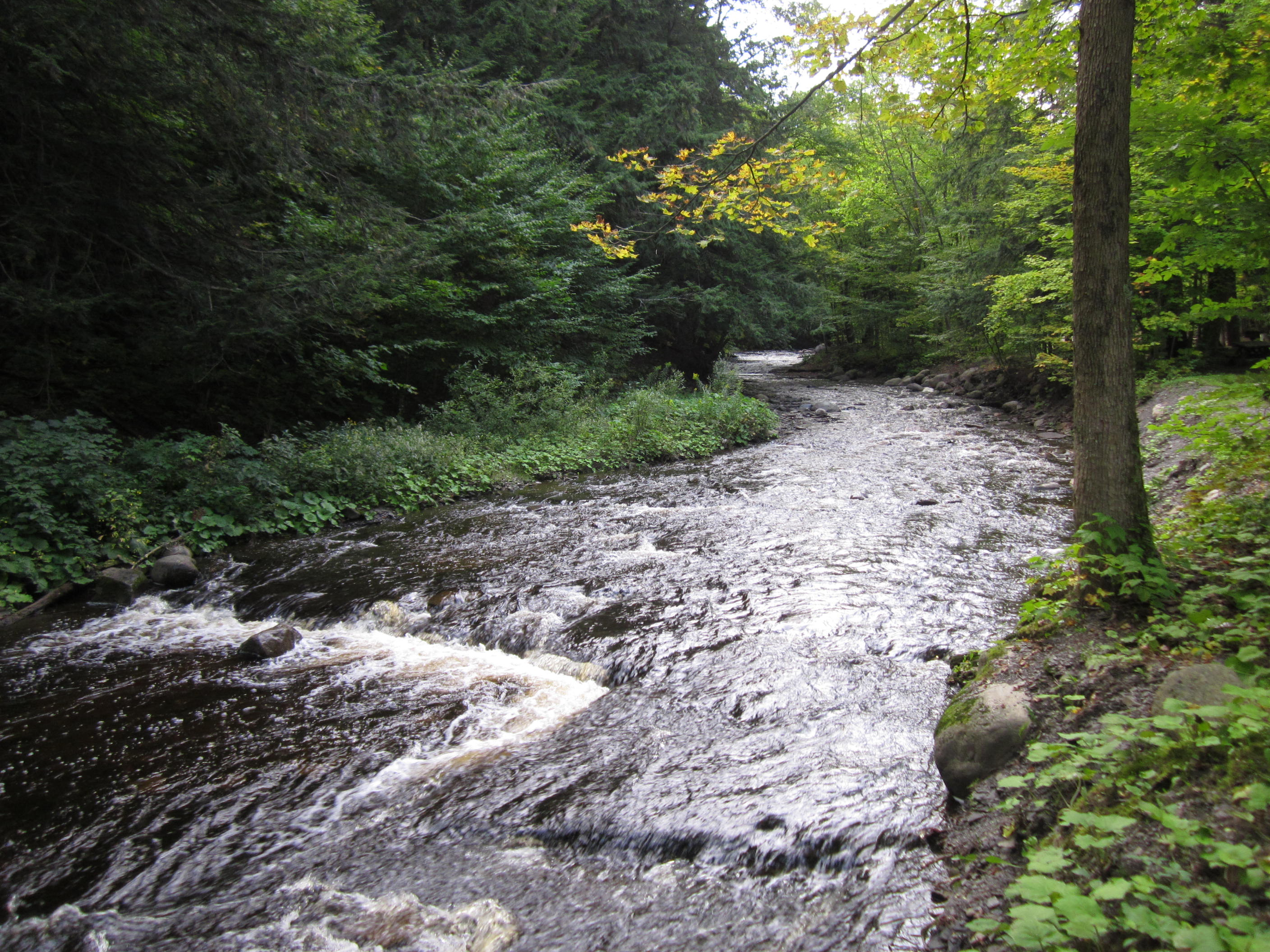
- Whetstone Creek in Whetstone Gulf State Park, September 2011.

- Location within New York
- Type: State park
- Location: 6065 West Road; Lowville, New York
- Nearest city: Lowville, New York
- Coordinates: 43°42′07″N 75°28′26″W
- Area: 515 acres (2.08 km^{2})
- Created: 1929
- Operator: New York State Office of Parks, Recreation and Historic Preservation
- Visitors: 118,577 (in 2014)
- Open: All year
- Camp sites: 62
- Website: Whetstone Gulf State Park

Whetstone Gulf State Park is a 515-acre (2.08 km^{2}) state park located in Lewis County, New York. The park is on the edge of the Tug Hill Plateau, south of Lowville, on the border of the towns of Turin and Martinsburg. The east end of the park is located near New York State Route 26.

== Park description ==
The park is built in and around a three-mile-long (4.8 km), 380-foot-deep (120 m) gorge cut into the eastern edge of the Tug Hill Plateau. Above the gorge is Whetstone Reservoir, stocked with tiger muskie and largemouth bass for fishermen.

The park offers 62 campsites, 20 of which include electric hookups. Areas for fishing, a picnic area along Whetstone Creek, a man-made swimming area, and a playground are also available. Trails for hiking and cross-country skiing are found throughout the park, including a six-mile (9.7 km) loop around the rim of the gorge.

== See also ==
- List of New York state parks
