= Salmon River Reservoir =

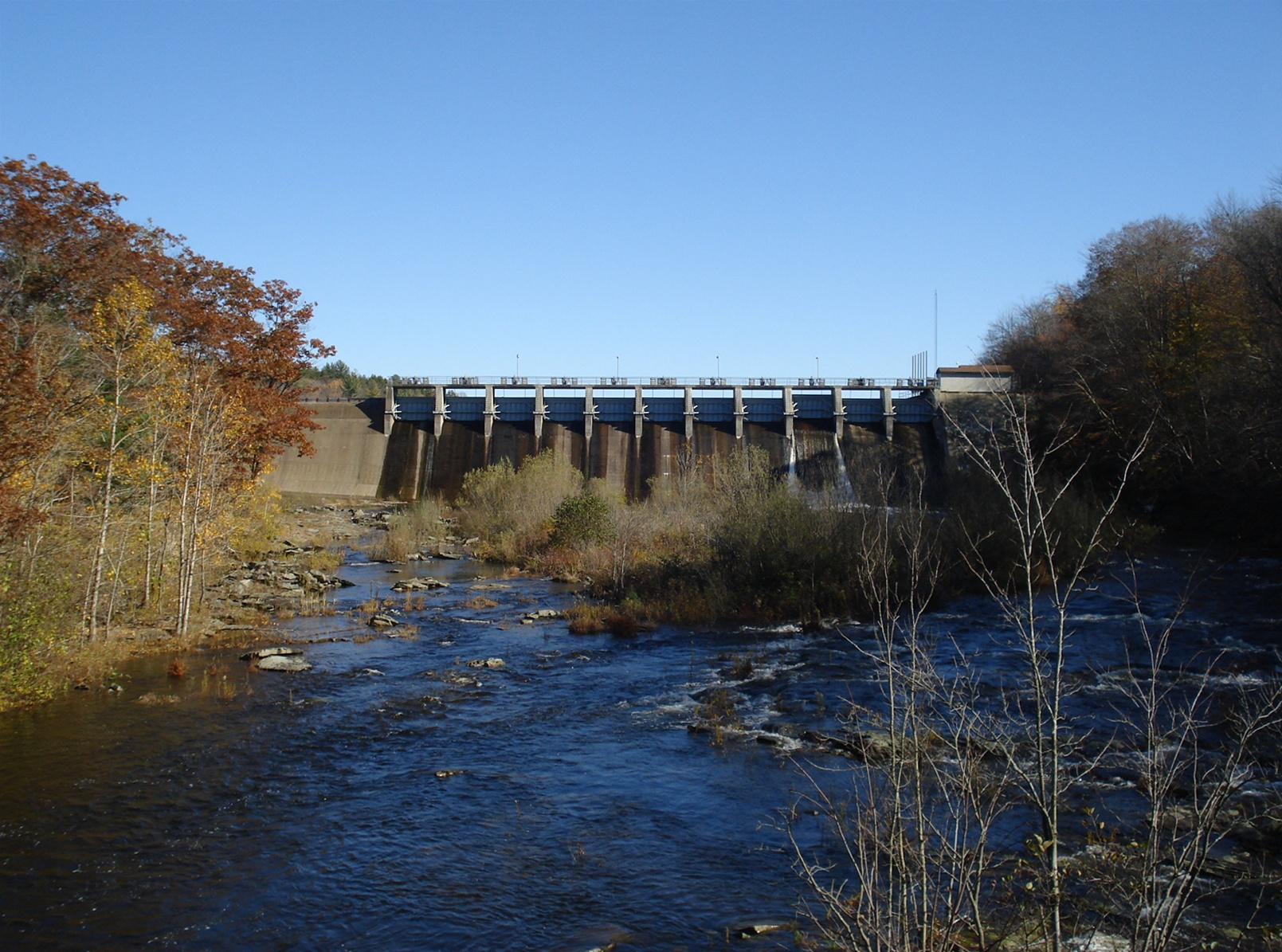
- View of the dam that impounds the upper Salmon River Reservoir, October 2008

- Location within New York Location within the United States
- Location: Oswego County, New York, United States
- Coordinates: 43°32′39″N 75°55′10″W
- Type: Reservoir
- Primary inflows: Salmon River
- Primary outflows: Salmon River
- Basin countries: United States
- Surface area: 3,379 acres (13.67 km^{2})
- Average depth: 19 feet (5.8 m)
- Max. depth: 55 ft (17 m)
- Shore length^{1}: 30.6 miles (49.2 km)
- Surface elevation: 938 ft (286 m)
- Islands: 11; Burdick Island, Huckleberry Island
- Settlements: Redfield, New York
- ^{1} Shore length is not a well-defined measure.

Salmon River Reservoir, also known as the Redfield Reservoir, is a man-made lake located near the hamlet of Redfield, New York. The reservoir was created with the completion of a hydroelectric dam in 1912. It has the capacity to hold 56,000 acre-feet (69,000,000 m^{3}) of water. It is the larger of the Salmon River's two reservoirs.

== Fishing ==
Fish species present in the lake include brown trout, rainbow trout, smallmouth bass, walleye, yellow perch, and pumpkinseed sunfish. Access is permitted by a concrete ramp off Orwell-Redfield Road, five miles (8.0 km) west of Redfield, and from County Route 17 in the hamlet of Redfield. A beach access launch is also available from the CCC Road off Orwell-Redfield Road, four miles (6.4 km) west of the hamlet of Redfield.
