= Redfield, New York =

- Town
- Location in Oswego County and the state of New York.
- Coordinates: 43°34′32″N 75°50′1″W
- Country: United States
- State: New York
- County: Oswego

Area
  - Total: 93.43 sq mi (241.97 km^{2})
  - Land: 89.82 sq mi (232.63 km^{2})
  - Water: 3.61 sq mi (9.34 km^{2})
- Elevation: 1,138 ft (347 m)

Population (2010)
  - Total: 550
  - Estimate (2016): 567
  - Density: 6.3/sq mi (2.44/km^{2})
- Time zone: UTC-5 (Eastern (EST))
  - Summer (DST): UTC-4 (EDT)
- ZIP code: 13437
- Area code: 315
- FIPS code: 36-60873
- GNIS feature ID: 0979410
- Website: https://townofredfield.com/

Redfield is a town in Oswego County, New York, United States. The population was 550 at the 2010 census.

The Town of Redfield was incorporated from part of the Town of Mexico in 1800. The town is in the northeastern corner of the county.

As the town is located in the lake effect snowbelt, it is known for its frequent and heavy snowfalls, even more so than other towns in upstate New York. In February 2007, the town unofficially set a record when 141 inches (360 cm) of snow fell in 10 days.

== Geography ==
The northern town line is the border of Jefferson County and the eastern town line is the border of Lewis County.

According to the United States Census Bureau, the town has a total area of 93.4 square miles (242 km^{2}), of which 90.1 square miles (233 km^{2}) is land and 3.4 square miles (8.8 km^{2}) (3.60%) is water.

Redfield is on the Tug Hill Plateau of northwestern New York.

== Demographics ==
Historical population
Census	Pop.	Note	%±
1820	336		—
1830	341		1.5%
1840	507		48.7%
1850	752		48.3%
1860	1,087		44.5%
1870	1,324		21.8%
1880	1,294		−2.3%
1890	1,060		−18.1%
1900	911		−14.1%
1910	803		−11.9%
1920	647		−19.4%
1930	583		−9.9%
1940	517		−11.3%
1950	418		−19.1%
1960	388		−7.2%
1970	386		−0.5%
1980	459		18.9%
1990	564		22.9%
2000	606		7.4%
2010	550		−9.2%
2016 (est.)	567		3.1%
U.S. Decennial Census

As of the census of 2000, there were 607 people, 230 households, and 172 families residing in the town. Population density was 6.7 people per square mile (2.6/km^{2}). There were 537 housing units at an average density of 6.0 per square mile (2.3/km^{2}). The racial makeup of the town was 98.02% White, 0.66% African American, 0.82% from other races, and 0.49% from two or more races. Hispanic or Latino of any race were 1.65% of the population.

There were 230 households, out of which 33.9% had children under the age of 18 living with them, 58.7% were married couples living together, 8.7% had a female householder with no husband present, and 25.2% were non-families. 21.3% of all households were made up of individuals, and 8.7% had someone living alone who was 65 years of age or older. The average household size was 2.64 and the average family size was 3.06.

In the town, the population was spread out, with 26.5% under the age of 18, 6.9% from 18 to 24, 27.2% from 25 to 44, 25.4% from 45 to 64, and 14.0% who were 65 years of age or older. The median age was 39 years. For every 100 females, there were 94.6 males. For every 100 females age 18 and over, there were 94.8 males.

The median income for a household in the town was $33,304, and the median income for a family was $39,792. Males had a median income of $28,750 versus $22,386 for females. The per capita income for the town was $13,277. About 6.9% of families and 12.7% of the population were below the poverty line, including 13.3% of those under age 18 and 11.4% of those age 65 or over.

== Communities and locations in Redfield ==
- Greenboro – A hamlet in the northwestern corner of the town on Route 17.
- Noble Shores – A hamlet by the western town line and north of the Salmon River.
- Redfield – The hamlet of Redfield in the southeastern part of the town on Route 17. The community is north of the Salmon River.
- Salmon River – A stream flowing through the town and widening into a reservoir near the community of Redfield.
- Salmon River Reservoir – A reservoir located partly in the town.

== Snowstorm of 2007 ==
The National Weather Service reported that Redfield had an unofficial total of 141 inches (360 cm) of snow over 10 days in early February 2007, which would be an unofficial state record for New York.
