= Torino (disambiguation) =

Torino may refer to:

== Places ==
- Torino, Italian name of Turin, a major industrial city in northwestern Italy
- Provincia di Torino, Italian for the Province of Turin
- 9523 Torino, an asteroid

== People ==
- Torino (footballer) (1948–2013), Vitorino Lopes Garcia, Brazilian football manager and player
- Torino Hunte (born 1990), Dutch footballer

== Sports ==
- Torino 2006, 2006 Winter Olympics and Paralympics
- Torino F.C., a football club based in Turin
  - Il Grande Torino, a 1940s football team
- Atlético Torino, a Peruvian football club based in Talara

== Transportation and vehicles ==
- Ford Torino, a car formerly built by the Ford Motor Company
- IKA-Renault Torino, a car sold by Renault in Argentina

== Entertainment ==
- Torino (album), a 2002 album by Cinerama
- Gran Torino, a 2008 film by Clint Eastwood, centered on the eponymous Ford Torino car

== Facilities and structures ==
- Torino Hut, a refuge in the Mont Blanc massif in the Aosta Valley, Italy
- Torino Observatory, Turin, Italy; an astronomical observatory

== Military ==
- 52nd Infantry Division "Torino", a division of the Italian Army in World War II
- 52nd Artillery Regiment "Torino", Italian army regiment
- 82nd Infantry Regiment "Torino", Italian army regiment

== Other uses ==
- Torino scale, used by astronomers to assess the potential danger of impact by near-Earth objects
- Torino (typeface)
- Torino, an alternative name for the Italian wine grape Dolcetto
- Torino, a range of products from Swiss chocolate-maker Camille Bloch

== See also ==
- Torino 2006 (video game)
- Tornio, a city in Finland
- Turin (disambiguation)
