= Salmon River Falls =

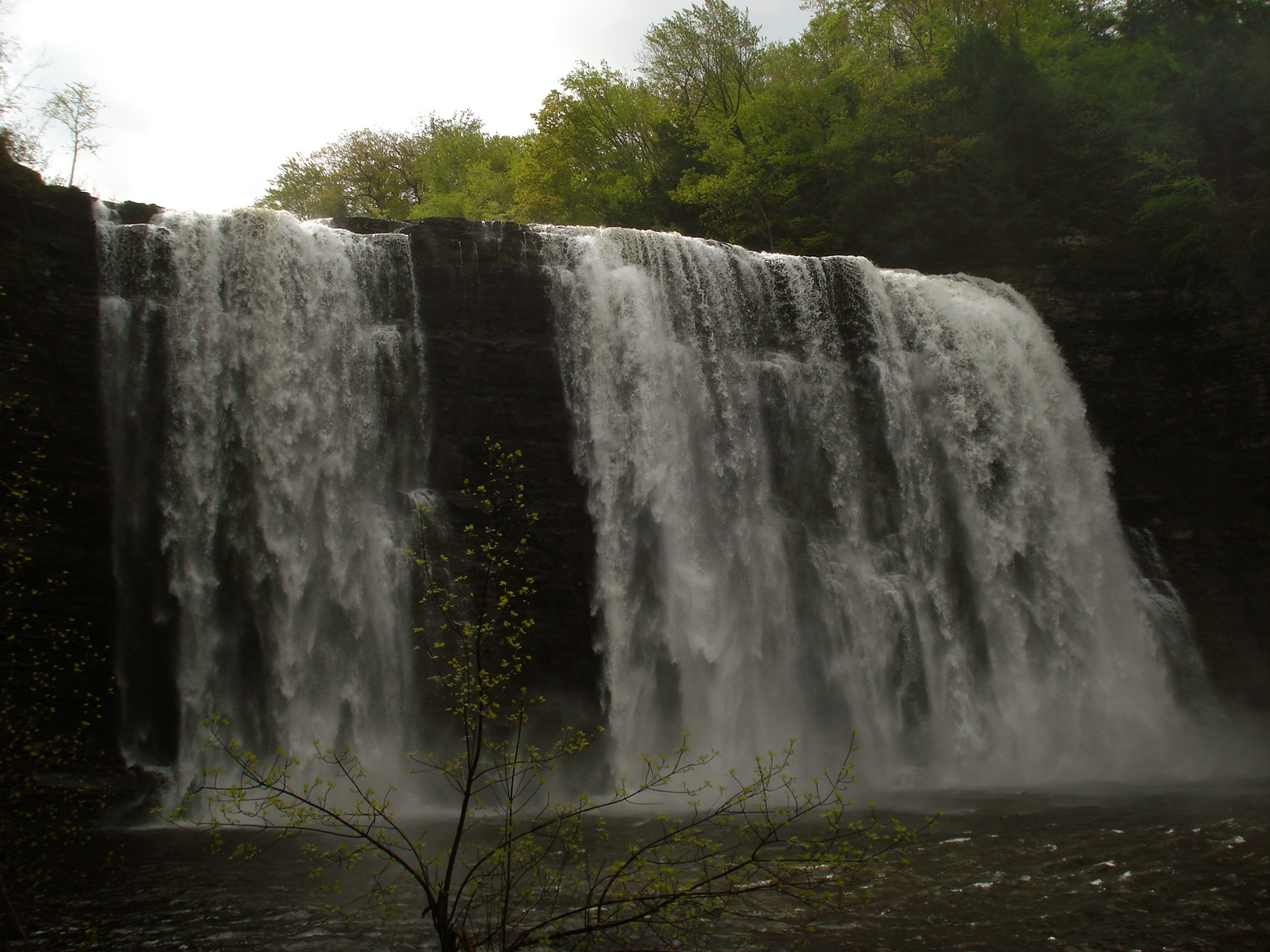
- Salmon River Falls, May 2009.

- Location within New York
- Location: Salmon River Falls Unique Area, Oswego County, NY, U.S.
- Coordinates: 43°32′52″N 75°56′27″W
- Type: Ledge
- Elevation: 741 feet (226 m)
- Total height: 110 feet (34 m)
- Watercourse: Salmon River

The Salmon River Falls is a 110-foot (34 m) waterfall on the Salmon River in Oswego County, New York in the United States. It is located approximately 15 miles inland from the river's confluence with Lake Ontario within the 112-acre (0.45 km^{2}) Salmon River Falls Unique Area, which is managed by the New York State Department of Environmental Conservation. The falls and surrounding land are open to the public and are a popular sightseeing destination within the region.

== History ==
Prior to European settlement, the Salmon River Falls area was utilized by the Onondaga, Oneida, and Cayuga tribes of the Iroquois Confederacy as seasonal fishing grounds, where they would harvest Atlantic salmon that were blocked from further upstream migration on the Salmon River by the falls.

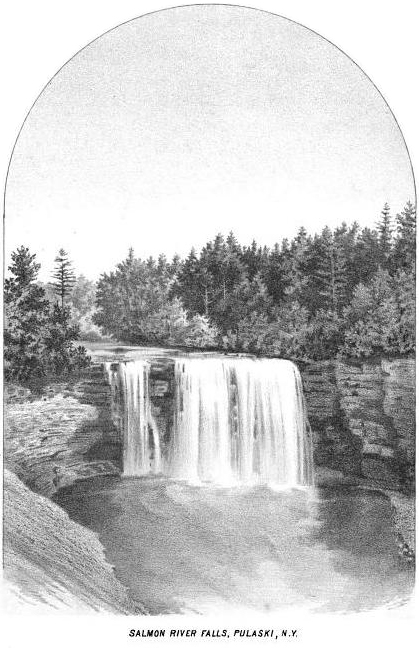
Drawing of the Salmon River Falls c. 1877

It was not until the early 1800s that roads began to expand into the heavily forested region surrounding the falls, allowing for the first sightseers to visit the falls. Recreational and commercial salmon fishing was also noted at the falls prior to the extirpation of Atlantic salmon from the river in 1872. A tourist lodge and dancing establishment known as The Cataract House was operated near the falls between 1860 and 1888, and a food and novelty stand was operated at the falls in 1896. At this time, the falls were alternately referred to as High Falls in some sources.

The Salmon River underwent extensive changes in the early 1900s with the construction of hydroelectric dams and their associated reservoirs. Between 1912 and 1930, dams and reservoirs were constructed both upstream and downstream of the falls, and a 10,000-foot (3,000 m) pipeline was constructed that bypassed the Salmon River Falls. As the amount of water flowing over the falls diminished, their appeal as a sightseeing destination dwindled as well. During this time, the falls and surrounding land was owned by the Salmon River Power Company, which would later be absorbed by the Niagara Mohawk power company. The area remained unimproved, and by the 1960s the falls were known mainly as a problematic location associated with graffiti, cliff diving, unregulated camping, drinking and drug use.

Ownership of the falls was transferred to New York State in 1993, and additional water was allowed to be released over the falls starting in 1996. The area has since been improved with parking areas, wheelchair-accessible trails, and interpretive kiosks. As a safety measure, fencing was installed near gorge edges and access within 15 feet (4.6 m) of the falls' edge was restricted. Despite these and other safety regulations, the falls were the location of at least five deaths between 1994 and 2013, including at least one person who died while attempting to cliff-dive off the falls.

== Recreation and management ==
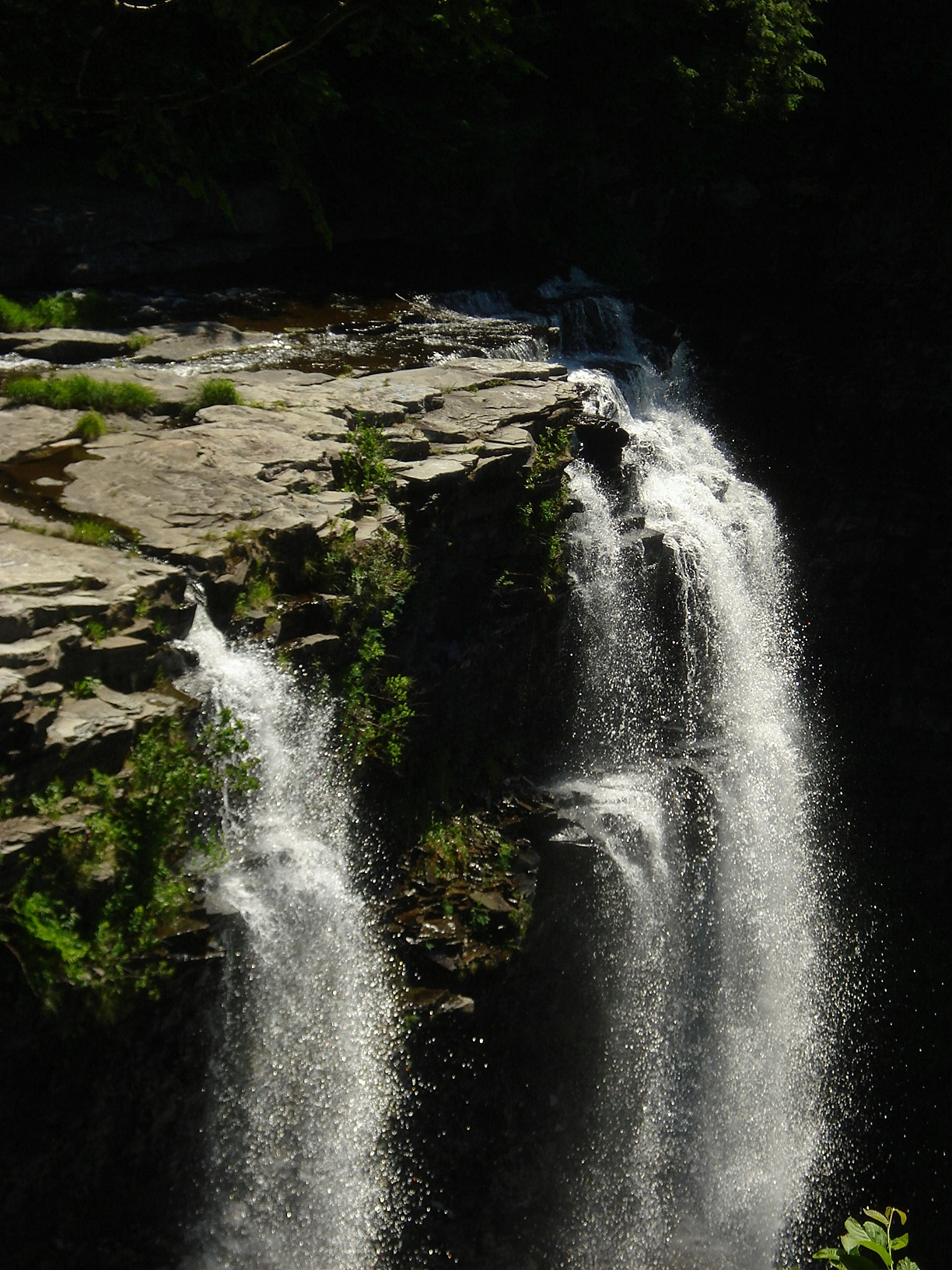
The Salmon River Falls as viewed from an overlook in the Salmon River Falls Unique Area.

The Salmon River Falls Unique Area allows visitors to view the falls via improved trails leading to both the base and the top of the falls. Fencing and special regulations are in place to keep visitors safe during their visit. Specifically, locations that are within 15 feet (4.6 m) of the falls and the gorge walls, including the plunge pool, are off-limits, with the exception of a dedicated trail maintained to allow access near the falls' base. In addition, the area is officially closed between sunset and sunrise, and alcoholic beverages are not permitted on the property.

The area downstream of the falls has become an ice climbing destination during the winter months. Climbing activities are restricted to the ice formations along the edge of the gorge; climbers are prohibited from ascending the face of the falls.

=== Flow management ===
A 10,000-foot (3,000 m) pipeline bypasses the stretch of the river between the Salmon River Reservoir and Lighthouse Hill Reservoir, which includes the falls' location. For many years after the pipeline was constructed in 1912, very little water was allowed to pass over the falls (typically less than 5 cu ft/s or 0.14 m^{3}/s) as the vast majority of water released from the Salmon River Reservoir was directed through the pipeline.

However, since 1996 a minimum base flow has been released to the river's "bypass stretch" to enhance the aesthetic appeal of the falls, as dictated by terms in the Federal Energy Regulatory Commission's re-licensing agreement for hydroelectric power generation on the river. These minimum flows range from 20 cu ft/s (0.57 m^{3}/s) between July 1 and September 30, to 7 cu ft/s (0.20 m^{3}/s) between October 1 and June 30. Occasional high water releases of up to 10,000 cu ft/s (280 m^{3}/s) may occur, and higher flows may be seen during extreme flood conditions.

== Geology and natural history ==
The Salmon River Falls formed as the result of two different types of bedrock eroding at different rates over time. At the top of the falls lies Oswego sandstone, which is relatively resistant to erosion when compared to the softer Pulaski shale at the falls' bottom. As the soft shale eroded away, the hard sandstone remained, eventually creating the waterfall as it is seen today.

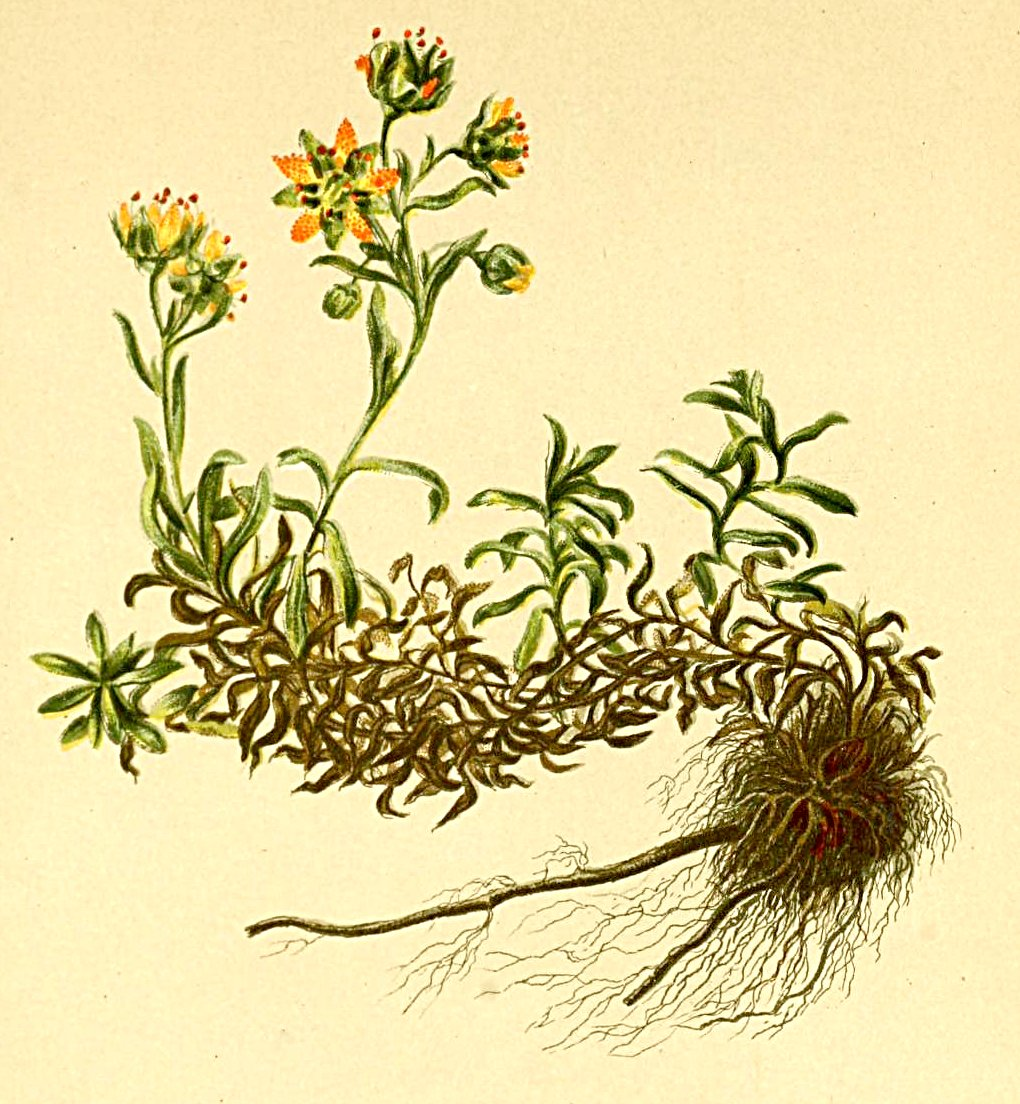
The damp cliffs of the Salmon River Falls gorge are home to several regionally rare plant species, including yellow mountain saxifrage (Saxifraga aizoides).

The Salmon River Falls Unique Area contains four distinct plant communities:

- Northern hardwood forest, 67 acres (27 ha). Dominated by deciduous tree species such as sugar maple (Acer saccharum), American beech (Fagus grandifolia) and yellow birch (Betula alleghaniensis).
- Hemlock-northern hardwood forest, nine acres (3.6 ha). Dominated by coniferous species such as eastern hemlock (Tsuga canadensis) and eastern white pine (Pinus strobus), as well as mixed deciduous hardwoods.
- Shale talus slope woodland, 19 acres (7.7 ha). Featuring steep wooded rocky slopes dominated primarily by eastern hemlock and northern hardwood species.
- Shale cliff and talus community, six acres (2.4 ha). Featuring damp, sheer cliffs with loose rocks and talus accumulations at their base; ledges support some sparse herbaceous plant cover, including flat-top aster (Doellingeria umbellata), fen grass-of-Parnassus (Parnassia glauca), and bladder ferns (Cystopteris).

The shale cliff and talus community at the falls also contains two regionally rare plant species considered threatened in New York State: Birds-eye primrose (Primula mistassinica) and yellow mountain saxifrage (Saxifraga aizoides). Although these species are uncommon within the state, this is mainly due to the rarity of the damp cliff-side habitats that they require. The inaccessibility of the cliffs where these plants grow keeps them relatively protected, however ice climbers are forbidden from climbing on bare rock cliffs as a measure to avoid impacting these rare plants.

A 1996 survey found that bald eagles use the gorge as a location for roosting at night.

== See also ==
- List of waterfalls
