= Tug Hill =

- Region
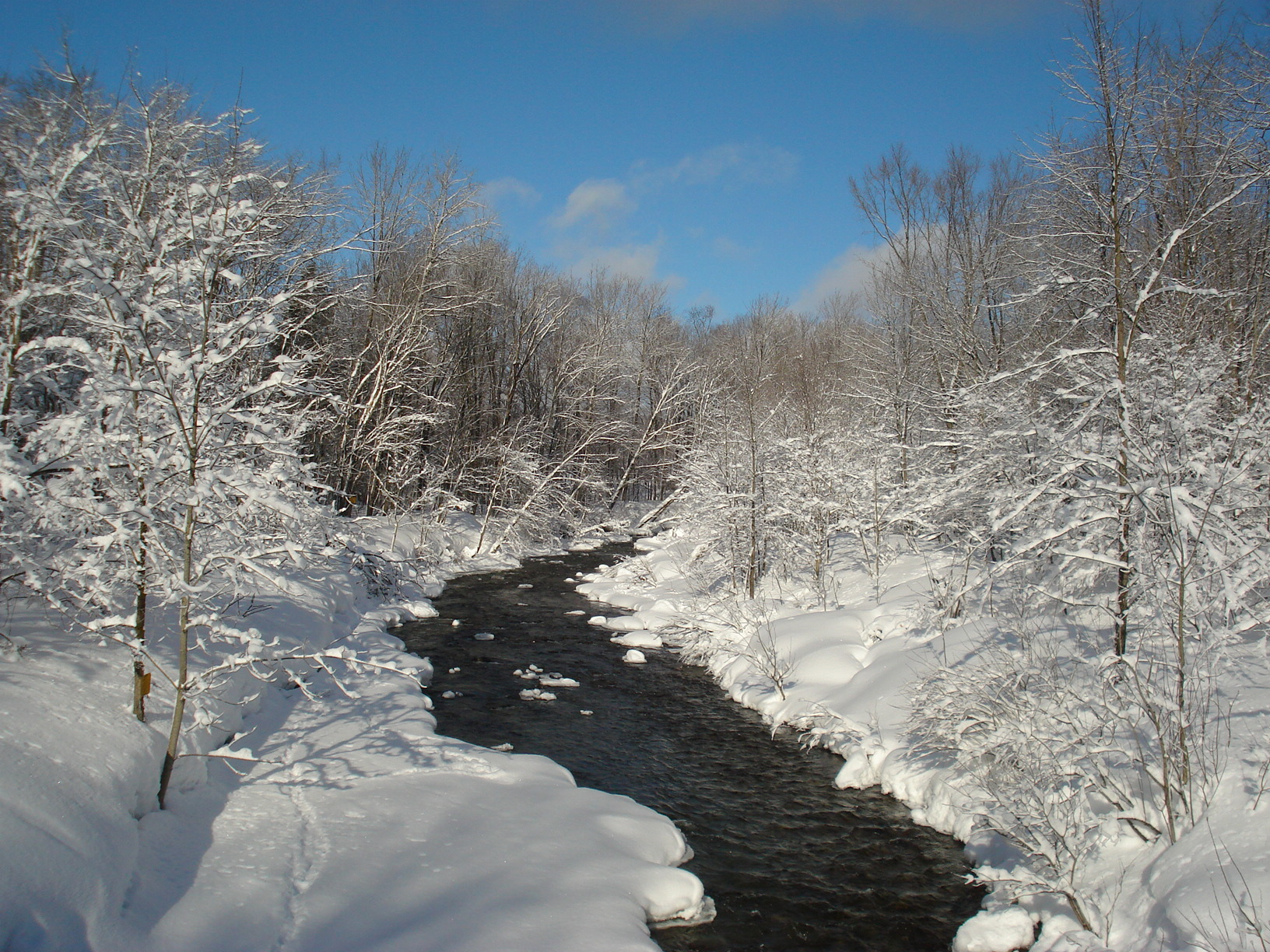
- View of the North Branch of the Salmon River after a fresh snowfall, north of Redfield, in the Tug Hill region of New York.

- Map of New York State showing the greater Tug Hill region (light red), and its heavily forested "core" region (dark red). Core area based upon The Nature Conservancy's 150,000-acre (610 km^{2}) delineation.
- Coordinates: 43.62090°N 75.46379°W
- Country: United States
- State: New York
- Region: Tug Hill

Area
  - Total: 2,100 sq mi (5,400 km^{2})

Population
  - Total: 100,000 (approx.)
  - Density: 48/sq mi (18/km^{2})
- Time zone: UTC−5 (Eastern Standard Time)
  - Summer (DST): UTC−4 (Eastern Daylight Time)
- Area code: 315
- Area and population are given for the greater Tug Hill region as defined by NYS Law. The core Tug Hill area, covering at most 800 square miles (2,100 km^{2}) within the larger legal region, is sparsely populated, containing just a few thousand full-time residents.

Tug Hill, sometimes referred to as the Tug Hill Plateau, is an upland region in northern New York state, notable for heavy winter snows. The Tug Hill region is east of Lake Ontario, north of Oneida Lake, and west of the Adirondack Mountains. The region is separated from the Adirondacks by the Black River Valley.

Although the region was sometimes known as the Tug Hill plateau because its top is flat, it is not a plateau, but rather a cuesta, since it is composed of sedimentary rocks that tilt up on one side, rising from about 350 feet (110 m) on the west to over 2,000 feet (610 m) in the east.

It covers portions of four Upstate New York counties: Jefferson, Lewis, Oneida, and Oswego.

== Geographic scope ==
The Tug Hill region comprises an expansive ring of rural and agricultural outlying areas surrounding a sparsely populated "core" region. The majority of the region's population is concentrated in villages that are situated primarily at the region's outer edge.

=== Greater Tug Hill region ===
The greater Tug Hill region is defined in New York State law as encompassing the following 41 towns in four counties, with a total area of approximately 2,100 square miles (5,400 km^{2}):

==== Jefferson County ====
- Adams
- Champion
- Lorraine
- Rodman
- Rutland
- Watertown
- Worth

==== Lewis County ====
- Denmark
- Harrisburg
- Lewis
- Leyden
- Lowville
- Martinsburg
- Montague
- Osceola
- Pinckney
- Turin
- West Turin

==== Oneida County ====
- Annsville
- Ava
- Boonville
- Camden
- Florence
- Floyd
- Forestport
- Lee
- Remsen
- Steuben
- Trenton
- Vienna
- Western

==== Oswego County ====
- Albion
- Amboy
- Boylston
- Constantia
- Hastings
- Orwell
- Parish
- Redfield
- West Monroe
- Williamstown

=== Core Tug Hill region ===
Within the greater Tug Hill area lies the "core" Tug Hill region, defined not by municipal boundaries but rather by its continuous forests, minimal roads and sparse population. The stated size of the Tug Hill's core varies by source, but generally ranges from 235 square miles (610 km^{2}) to 800 square miles (2,100 km^{2}).

== History ==
Prior to European colonization, what was to become known as the Tug Hill region was controlled by the Iroquois Confederacy, specifically the Onondaga and Oneida nations. Tug Hill lands were used by the Iroquois as seasonal hunting and fishing grounds; permanent settlements were located primarily to the south and west of the region. These and other lands were seized from the Iroquois following the American Revolution.

Four million acres (16,187 km^{2}) in and around the Tug Hill region were initially purchased by colonial land speculator William Constable, who in turn subdivided the land to sell to New Englanders and newly arrived European immigrants. He also set aside 10,500 acres (42 km^{2}) for regional improvements, such as roads and canals.

Inexpensive land, abundant timber resources, and available farmland drove increased settlement in the region from 1820 to 1880. Expanding railroads and the completion of the Black River Canal in 1851 allowed for increased exports of food and timber products out of the region, often destined for New York City. Dairy farming and timber-based industries flourished in the region throughout the late 1800s, and around 1870, the region's population peaked at 80,000.

However, the Tug Hill's rugged terrain, poor soils, and difficult winters eventually caused many of the region's inhabitants to abandon their farms and settlements. By 1930, most of the region's agriculture and industry was concentrated in the more fertile valleys of the region's northwestern perimeter. Intentional and natural reforestation soon obscured almost all evidence of the core's relatively brief agricultural era.

== Characteristics ==
=== Geography and ecology ===
The core Tug Hill region encompasses 150,000 acres (610 km^{2}) of unbroken, generally second-growth, northern hardwood forest, and is drained by a vast network of streams. Important rivers and streams whose headwaters are located within the Tug Hill region include the Mohawk River, Deer River, Salmon River, Mad River, Sandy Creek, and the east and west branches of Fish Creek. Despite the presence of numerous streams, many of the soils in the regions' core are poorly drained. Almost all the soils have some combination of factors which render them unsuitable for agriculture, including shallow depth, stoniness, rough topography, poor or excessive drainage, strong acidity and/or low fertility. Agricultural activity is largely absent from the Tug Hill's core, and is concentrated mainly in the outlying northern and western portions of the region, where soils are better drained and more fertile.

According to the A. W. Kuchler U.S. potential natural vegetation types, the Tug Hill Plateau would have a dominant vegetation type of Northern Hardwoods (106) with a dominant vegetation form of Northern Hardwoods (23). The plant hardiness zone at the Tug Hill Wildlife Management Area is 4a with an average annual extreme minimum air temperature of −29.5 °F (−34.2 °C). The spring bloom typically peaks around May 13 and fall color usually peaks around September 30.

Although much of the area is controlled by New York State, small, privately owned parcels exist, and most permanent residences are located near state highways or maintained county roads. While hunting camps in the back country areas of the Tug Hill region that are maintained during the hunting season often do not possess electricity or indoor plumbing, the majority of permanent residences in the area feature these amenities. Few roads or villages exist in these more remote areas, and undeveloped reaches of the region are a haven for wildlife, including deer, rabbits, beavers, turkeys, fishers, bobcats, coyote, and the occasional black bear. Salmon, trout, bass, walleye, and waterfowl can be found in the Tug Hill's abundant waterways.

=== Recreation ===
The Tug Hill region and its surrounding communities contains numerous attractions and recreational opportunities nestled in its many small villages and hamlets. These include antique shops, flea markets, handmade furniture, gifts and crafts, fishing and hunting guide services, miles of snowmobile trails, restaurants, lodging, bed and breakfasts, campgrounds, boating, canoeing, both down-hill and cross-country skiing, pure maple syrup products, and roadside produce stands.

== Climate ==
According to the Köppen climate classification system, the Tug Hill Plateau has a Warm-summer, Humid continental climate (Dfb). Dfb climates are characterized by at least one month having an average mean temperature ≤ 32.0 °F (0.0 °C), at least four months with an average mean temperature ≥ 50.0 °F (10.0 °C), all months with an average mean temperature < 71.6 °F (22.0 °C) and no significant precipitation difference between seasons. Although most summer days are comfortably humid on the Tug Hill Plateau, episodes of warmth and moderate humidity can occur with heat index values > 87 °F (31 °C). Since 1981, the highest air temperature at the Tug Hill Wildlife Management Area was 91.3 °F (32.9 °C) on 08/14/2002, and the highest daily average mean dew point was 67.6 °F (19.8 °C) on 07/17/2015. Since 1981, the wettest calendar day was 4.35 inches (110 mm) on 12/28/1984. During the winter months, the average annual extreme minimum air temperature at the Tug Hill Wildlife Management Area is −29.5 °F (−34.2 °C). Since 1981, the coldest air temperature was −34.3 °F (−36.8 °C) on 01/04/1981. Episodes of extreme cold and wind can occur with wind chill values < −45 °F (−43 °C).

Climate data for Tug Hill Wildlife Management Area, Elevation 1,923 ft (586 m), 1981-2010 normals, extremes 1981-2018
Month	Jan	Feb	Mar	Apr	May	Jun	Jul	Aug	Sep	Oct	Nov	Dec	Year
Record high °F (°C)	59.5 (15.3)	62.9 (17.2)	77.3 (25.2)	84.8 (29.3)	85.3 (29.6)	88.6 (31.4)	89.5 (31.9)	91.3 (32.9)	87.0 (30.6)	77.1 (25.1)	68.6 (20.3)	61.8 (16.6)	91.3 (32.9)
Mean daily maximum °F (°C)	24.7 (−4.1)	28.1 (−2.2)	36.8 (2.7)	49.6 (9.8)	62.6 (17.0)	71.6 (22.0)	75.9 (24.4)	74.2 (23.4)	65.3 (18.5)	53.6 (12.0)	40.4 (4.7)	29.2 (−1.6)	51.1 (10.6)
Daily mean °F (°C)	14.6 (−9.7)	17.9 (−7.8)	27.2 (−2.7)	39.5 (4.2)	51.2 (10.7)	60.3 (15.7)	63.9 (17.7)	62.3 (16.8)	54.2 (12.3)	44.1 (6.7)	32.5 (0.3)	20.9 (−6.2)	40.8 (4.9)
Mean daily minimum °F (°C)	4.5 (−15.3)	7.7 (−13.5)	17.6 (−8.0)	29.3 (−1.5)	39.8 (4.3)	48.9 (9.4)	51.8 (11.0)	50.5 (10.3)	43.1 (6.2)	34.7 (1.5)	24.7 (−4.1)	12.7 (−10.7)	30.5 (−0.8)
Record low °F (°C)	−34.3 (−36.8)	−30.2 (−34.6)	−15.2 (−26.2)	1.9 (−16.7)	22.3 (−5.4)	26.2 (−3.2)	37.2 (2.9)	29.9 (−1.2)	21.2 (−6.0)	15.9 (−8.9)	−18.5 (−28.1)	−29.0 (−33.9)	−34.3 (−36.8)
Average precipitation inches (mm)	5.34 (136)	4.17 (106)	4.03 (102)	4.15 (105)	4.52 (115)	4.13 (105)	4.77 (121)	4.98 (126)	5.56 (141)	6.08 (154)	5.76 (146)	5.93 (151)	59.42 (1,509)
Average relative humidity (%)	80.2	78.7	71.2	65.5	64.9	69.8	70.7	73.7	75.7	75.9	80.6	85.0	74.3
Average dew point °F (°C)	9.6 (−12.4)	12.4 (−10.9)	19.1 (−7.2)	28.9 (−1.7)	39.8 (4.3)	50.4 (10.2)	54.2 (12.3)	53.8 (12.1)	46.7 (8.2)	37.0 (2.8)	27.2 (−2.7)	17.1 (−8.3)	33.1 (0.6)
Source: PRISM

=== Winter weather ===
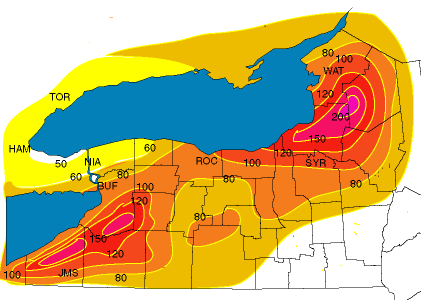
Average seasonal snowfall totals for areas impacted by lake-effect snow in New York (in inches). The Tug Hill region, in the northeastern section of the map, receives the greatest average snowfall totals within New York State.

The Tug Hill region is renowned for its bountiful snowfall. The region's topography and location in relation to Lake Ontario often creates ideal conditions for lake-effect snow; snowfall totals for the Tug Hill region average more than 200 inches (16.7 ft; 5.1 m) per winter. Tug Hill snowfalls have been described as being among "the most intense storms in the world" in terms of the amount of snow falling during a short period of time. Snow depths commonly reach five feet (1.5 m) or more, and deeper amounts are routine.

The Tug Hill town of Montague in Lewis County recorded the unofficial New York State 24-hour snowfall record of 77 inches (6.4 ft; 2.0 m) in January 1997. Hooker (a hamlet in the town of Montague) holds the state record for snowfall in a single season, after accumulating 466.9 inches (38.91 ft; 11.86 m) of snow during the winter of 1976–1977.

On February 12, 2007, the National Weather Service reported on "tremendous" snowfall totals in the Tug Hill region that accumulated between February 3–12. During that ten-day period, the hamlet of Redfield received 141 inches (11.8 ft; 3.6 m) of snow, the village of Parish received 121 inches (10.1 ft; 3.1 m) of snow, and the hamlet of North Osceola received 106 inches (8.8 ft; 2.7 m) of snow.

One architectural feature related to the heavy snowfall can be found locally in some hunting camps: supplemental, second-floor entry doors. These are located directly above the ground-level front door, and such apertures are used when so much snow has accumulated that the ground-level door cannot be accessed.

Climate data for 12 NNW Hooker, NY (1981-2010 normals)
Month	Jan	Feb	Mar	Apr	May	Jun	Jul	Aug	Sep	Oct	Nov	Dec	Year
Average snowfall inches (cm)	58.5 (149)	54.9 (139)	31.9 (81)	12.3 (31)	0.6 (1.5)	0.0 (0.0)	0.0 (0.0)	0.0 (0.0)	0.0 (0.0)	3.0 (7.6)	19.5 (50)	59.6 (151)	240.3 (610)
Source: Golden Gate Weather Services

Climate data for Highmarket, NY (1981-2010 normals)
Month	Jan	Feb	Mar	Apr	May	Jun	Jul	Aug	Sep	Oct	Nov	Dec	Year
Average snowfall inches (cm)	58.6 (149)	40.9 (104)	26.7 (68)	7.4 (19)	0.2 (0.51)	0.0 (0.0)	0.0 (0.0)	0.0 (0.0)	0.0 (0.0)	2.8 (7.1)	19.3 (49)	52.2 (133)	208.1 (529)
Source: Golden Gate Weather Services

== See also ==
- Lake-effect snow
- North Country (New York)
- Ski country (New York)
