= Montague, New York =

- Town
- Location within New York Location within the United States
- Coordinates: 43°43′58″N 75°42′47″W
- Country: United States
- State: New York
- County: Lewis

Area
  - Total: 65.31 sq mi (169.16 km^{2})
  - Land: 65.15 sq mi (168.74 km^{2})
  - Water: 0.16 sq mi (0.42 km^{2})
- Elevation: 1,800 ft (550 m)

Population (2010)
  - Total: 78
  - Estimate (2016): 78
  - Density: 1.2/sq mi (0.46/km^{2})
- Time zone: UTC-5 (Eastern (EST))
  - Summer (DST): UTC-4 (EDT)
- ZIP Codes: 13367 (Lowville); 13626 (Copenhagen)
- Area code: 315
- FIPS code: 36-049-48032
- GNIS feature ID: 979230

Montague is a town in Lewis County, New York, United States. The population was 78 at the 2010 census. The town is named after Mary Montague Pierpont, the daughter of the original owner.

The town is on the western border of Lewis County. Montague is west of Lowville, the county seat, and is southeast of Watertown.

== History ==
The first settlements began circa 1846. In 1850, the town of Montague was formed from part of the town of West Turin. The town's population was 975 in 1880, the highest level in the town's history. The town is now known for snowmobile trails.

== Geography ==
According to the United States Census Bureau, the town has a total area of 65.3 square miles (169 km^{2}), of which 65.1 square miles (169 km^{2}) are land and 0.2 square miles (0.52 km^{2}), or 0.24%, are water.

The western town line is the border between Jefferson and Oswego counties.

=== Climate ===
The hamlet Hooker (New York) has a humid continental climate (Köppen Dfb). Montague is on the northern end of the Tug Hill Plateau, which is well known for having some of the snowiest winters in New York. Hooker holds the state record for seasonal snowfall of 466.9 inches (11.86m) during the winter of 1976-1977. Also, Montague holds a state record for snowfall during the 24-hour period from January 11–12 but it is not officially recognized by the National Weather Service.

Climate data for Hooker 43.8522 N, 75.7137 W, Elevation: 1,478 ft (450 m) (1991–2020 normals)
Month	Jan	Feb	Mar	Apr	May	Jun	Jul	Aug	Sep	Oct	Nov	Dec	Year
Mean daily maximum °F (°C)	26.1 (−3.3)	28.4 (−2.0)	37.1 (2.8)	50.8 (10.4)	64.1 (17.8)	72.3 (22.4)	76.7 (24.8)	75.3 (24.1)	68.4 (20.2)	55.7 (13.2)	41.9 (5.5)	31.7 (−0.2)	52.4 (11.3)
Daily mean °F (°C)	16.8 (−8.4)	18.8 (−7.3)	27.8 (−2.3)	40.9 (4.9)	53.6 (12.0)	62.0 (16.7)	66.0 (18.9)	64.5 (18.1)	57.4 (14.1)	46.6 (8.1)	34.3 (1.3)	23.9 (−4.5)	42.7 (6.0)
Mean daily minimum °F (°C)	7.5 (−13.6)	9.3 (−12.6)	18.5 (−7.5)	31.0 (−0.6)	43.0 (6.1)	51.7 (10.9)	55.3 (12.9)	53.8 (12.1)	46.5 (8.1)	37.4 (3.0)	26.8 (−2.9)	16.0 (−8.9)	33.1 (0.6)
Average precipitation inches (mm)	5.40 (137)	4.13 (105)	4.07 (103)	4.16 (106)	4.44 (113)	4.07 (103)	4.09 (104)	4.62 (117)	4.73 (120)	6.09 (155)	5.32 (135)	5.37 (136)	56.49 (1,434)
Average snowfall inches (cm)	60.6 (154)	54.7 (139)	28.4 (72)	9.6 (24)	0.6 (1.5)	0.0 (0.0)	0.0 (0.0)	0.0 (0.0)	0.0 (0.0)	2.6 (6.6)	20.6 (52)	50.6 (129)	227.7 (578.1)
Source 1: PRISM Climate Group
Source 2: NOAA (precipitation & snowfall)

== Demographics ==
Historical population
Census	Pop.	Note	%±
1860	707		—
1870	718		1.6%
1880	975		35.8%
1890	905		−7.2%
1900	766		−15.4%
1910	531		−30.7%
1920	450		−15.3%
1930	366		−18.7%
1940	329		−10.1%
1950	139		−57.8%
1960	73		−47.5%
1970	58		−20.5%
1980	32		−44.8%
1990	47		46.9%
2000	108		129.8%
2010	78		−27.8%
2016 (est.)	78		0.0%
U.S. Decennial Census

As of the census of 2000, there were 108 people, 45 households, and 28 families residing in the town. The population density was 1.7 inhabitants per square mile (0.66/km^{2}). There were 267 housing units at an average density of 4.1 per square mile (1.6/km^{2}). The entire town is White.

There were 45 households, out of which 24.4% had children under the age of 18 living with them, 55.6% were married couples living together, 4.4% had a female householder with no husband present, and 35.6% were non-families. 28.9% of all households were made up of individuals, and 13.3% had someone living alone who was 65 years of age or older. The average household size was 2.40 and the average family size was 2.97.

In the town, the population was spread out, with 25.0% under the age of 18, 1.9% from 18 to 24, 28.7% from 25 to 44, 30.6% from 45 to 64, and 13.9% who were 65 years of age or older. The median age was 40 years. For every 100 females, there were 83.1 males. For every 100 females age 18 and over, there were 97.6 males.

The median income for a household in the town was $34,688, and the median income for a family was $36,250. Males had a median income of $28,750 versus $19,000 for females. The per capita income for the town was $14,598. There were 10.3% of families and 14.9% of the population living below the poverty line, including 17.9% of under eighteens and 30.0% of those over 64.

== Communities and locations in Montague ==
- Gardners Corners – A location in the northeastern part of the town.
- Hooker – A hamlet in the southwestern part of the town.
- Liberty Corners – A location in the northwestern part of the town.
- Parkers – A hamlet in the eastern part of the town, south of Rector.
- Rector – A hamlet in the northeastern part of the town.
- Sears Pond – A small lake near the center of the town.
- Tug Hill Wildlife Management Area – A conservation area in the eastern part of Montague.
- World Record of Snow in 24 hours (77 inches) Jan 11–12, 1997

== See also ==
- Tug Hill Plateau
