= Treaty of Turin =

Treaty of Turin can refer to one of the following treaties signed in the northern Italian town of Turin:

- Treaty of Turin (1381), between the Republic of Venice and the Republic of Genoa, ending the War of Chioggia
- Treaty of Turin (1632), between France and Savoy
- Treaty of Turin (1673), between Savoy and the Republic of Genoa
- Treaty of Turin (1696), between France and Savoy, during the War of the League of Augsburg
- Treaty of Turin (1701), between France and Savoy
- Treaty of Turin (1733), between France and the Kingdom of Sardinia
- Treaty of Turin (1754), between Geneva and the Kingdom of Sardinia, regulating their mutual frontier
- Treaty of Turin (1760), between France and the Kingdom of Sardinia, regulating their mutual frontier
- Treaty of Turin (1769), between France and the Kingdom of Sardinia, regulating their mutual frontier
- Treaty of Turin (1816), between the Kingdom of Sardinia and Switzerland, regulating their mutual frontier
- Treaty of Turin (1860), between France and the Kingdom of Sardinia, ceding Savoy and Nice to France, after the Second Italian War of Independence

== See also ==
- Convention of Turin (1742), between Austria and Sardinia
