= Turin, Idlib =

Coordinates: 35°59′N 36°26′E

Turin, Idlib طورين
- Village
- Location in Syria
- Country: Syria
- Governorate: Idlib
- District: Jisr al-Shughur District
- Subdistrict: Darkush Nahiyah

Population (2004)
  - Total: 420
- Time zone: UTC+2 (EET)
  - Summer (DST): UTC+3 (EEST)
- City Qrya Pcode: C4237

Turin, Idlib (Arabic: طورين) is a Syrian village located in Darkush Nahiyah in Jisr al-Shughur District, Idlib. According to the Syria Central Bureau of Statistics (CBS), Turin, Idlib had a population of 420 in the 2004 census.
