= Battle of Turin (disambiguation) =

Battle of Turin may refer to:

- Battle of Turin (312), between Constantine the Great and Maxentius
- Siege of Turin (1640), in the Franco-Spanish War and Piedmontese Civil War
- Siege of Turin (1706), during the War of the Spanish Succession
