= Turin Airport (disambiguation) =

Turin Airport may refer to:

- Turin Airport, also known as Caselle Airport, the primary airport serving Turin, Piedmont, Italy.
- Turin-Aeritalia Airport, the historical city airport served Turin until 1953, Italy.

It may also refer to: Cuneo International Airport, sometimes marketed as "Turin Cuneo Airport" by some low-cost airlines.
