= Turin, New York =

- Town
- Location within New York Location within the United States
- Coordinates: 43°37′42″N 75°24′41″W
- Country: United States
- State: New York
- County: Lewis
- Settled: 1797
- Established: 1800

Area
  - Total: 31.38 sq mi (81.27 km^{2})
  - Land: 31.18 sq mi (80.75 km^{2})
  - Water: 0.20 sq mi (0.53 km^{2})

Population (2010)
  - Total: 761
  - Estimate (2016): 757
  - Density: 24.3/sq mi (9.38/km^{2})
- Time zone: UTC-5 (Eastern (EST))
  - Summer (DST): UTC-4 (EDT)
- ZIP Codes: 13473 (Turin); 13343 (Glenfield); 13368 (Lyons Falls)
- Area code: 315
- FIPS code: 36-049-75693
- GNIS feature ID: 979562
- Website: https://townofturinny.gov/

Turin is a town in Lewis County, New York, United States. The population was 768 at the 2020 census. Turin has a village, also named Turin. The town is south of Lowville, the county seat, and north of Rome.

== History ==
The town was first settled circa 1797.

The town of Turin was established in 1800 from the town of Mexico (Oswego County). In 1803, part of Turin was used to create the town of Martinsburg. Another part of Turin was added to Martinsburg in 1819. The town of West Turin formed from another part of Turin in 1830.

On August 7, 2023, an EF3 tornado hit the town, causing significant damage.

== Geography ==
According to the United States Census Bureau, the town has a total area of 31.4 square miles (81.3 km^{2}), of which 31.2 square miles (80.8 km^{2}) is land and 0.2 square mile (0.5 km^{2}) (0.67%) is water.

The eastern town line is defined by the Black River. Part of the town is on the Tug Hill Plateau.

New York State Route 12 and New York State Route 26 are north–south highways that parallel the Black River through the town. NY-12 is closer to the river.

== Demographics ==
Historical population
Census	Pop.	Note	%±
1820	1,812		—
1830	1,561		−13.9%
1840	1,704		9.2%
1850	1,826		7.2%
1860	1,849		1.3%
1870	1,493		−19.3%
1880	1,386		−7.2%
1890	1,277		−7.9%
1900	1,157		−9.4%
1910	1,030		−11.0%
1920	1,016		−1.4%
1930	897		−11.7%
1940	859		−4.2%
1950	856		−0.3%
1960	878		2.6%
1970	805		−8.3%
1980	824		2.4%
1990	873		5.9%
2000	793		−9.2%
2010	761		−4.0%
2016 (est.)	757	▼	−0.5%
U.S. Decennial Census

As of the census of 2020, there were 768 people, 445 households, and 379 families residing in the town. The population density was 24.6 inhabitants per square mile (9.5/km^{2}). There were 454 housing units at an average density of 14.5 per square mile (5.6/km^{2}). The racial makeup of the town was 96.5% White, 0.52% Black or African American, and 2.9% from two or more races. Hispanic or Latino of any race were 0.91% of the population.

There were 445 households, out of which 34.6% had children under the age of 18 living with them, 50.8% were married couples living together, 8.5% had a female householder with no spouse present, 12.1% had a male householder with no spouse present, and 14.8% were non-families. 9.9% of all households were made up of individuals, and 4.3% had someone living alone who was 65 years of age or older. The average household size was 2.80 and the average family size was 2.85.

In the town, the population was spread out, with 25.3% under the age of 18, 7.3% from 18 to 24, 22.4% from 25 to 44, 22.1% from 45 to 64, and 22.9% who were 65 years of age or older. The median age was 38 years. For every 100 females, there were 131.5 males.

The median income for a household in the town was $79,375, and the median income for a family was $64,063. Males had a median income of $42,708 versus $27,306 for females. The per capita income for the town was $84,344. About 9% of families and 10.5% of the population were below the poverty line, including 10.9% of those under age 18 and 3.8% of those age 65 or over.

== Communities and locations in the town of Turin ==
- Burdicks Crossing – A former location on the Black River.
- Glenfield – A hamlet near the Black River at the town line in the northeastern part of the town.
- Gomer Hill – An elevation in the western part of Turin.
- House Creek – An eastward-flowing tributary of the Black River.
- Houseville – A hamlet on NY-26, north of Turin village. The community is named after its founder, Eleazer House.
- Snow Ridge Ski Area – A skiing area north of Turin village.
- Turin – A village on NY-26 near the southern town line.
- Welch Hill – A hamlet by the southern town line, west of Turin village.
- Whetstone Gulf State Park – A state park at the northern town line, north of Houseville.

== In popular culture ==
The real-world geographic coordinates of Turin are found in an ancient temple beneath Rome, Italy in the "Da Vinci Disappearance" add-on mission for the Assassin's Creed: Brotherhood video game. It was discovered in the later game Assassin's Creed III that the coordinates marked the location of a Grand Temple hidden underground in Turin.
