= The Turin =

Apartment building in Manhattan, New York

Coordinates: 40.79008°N 73.96620°W

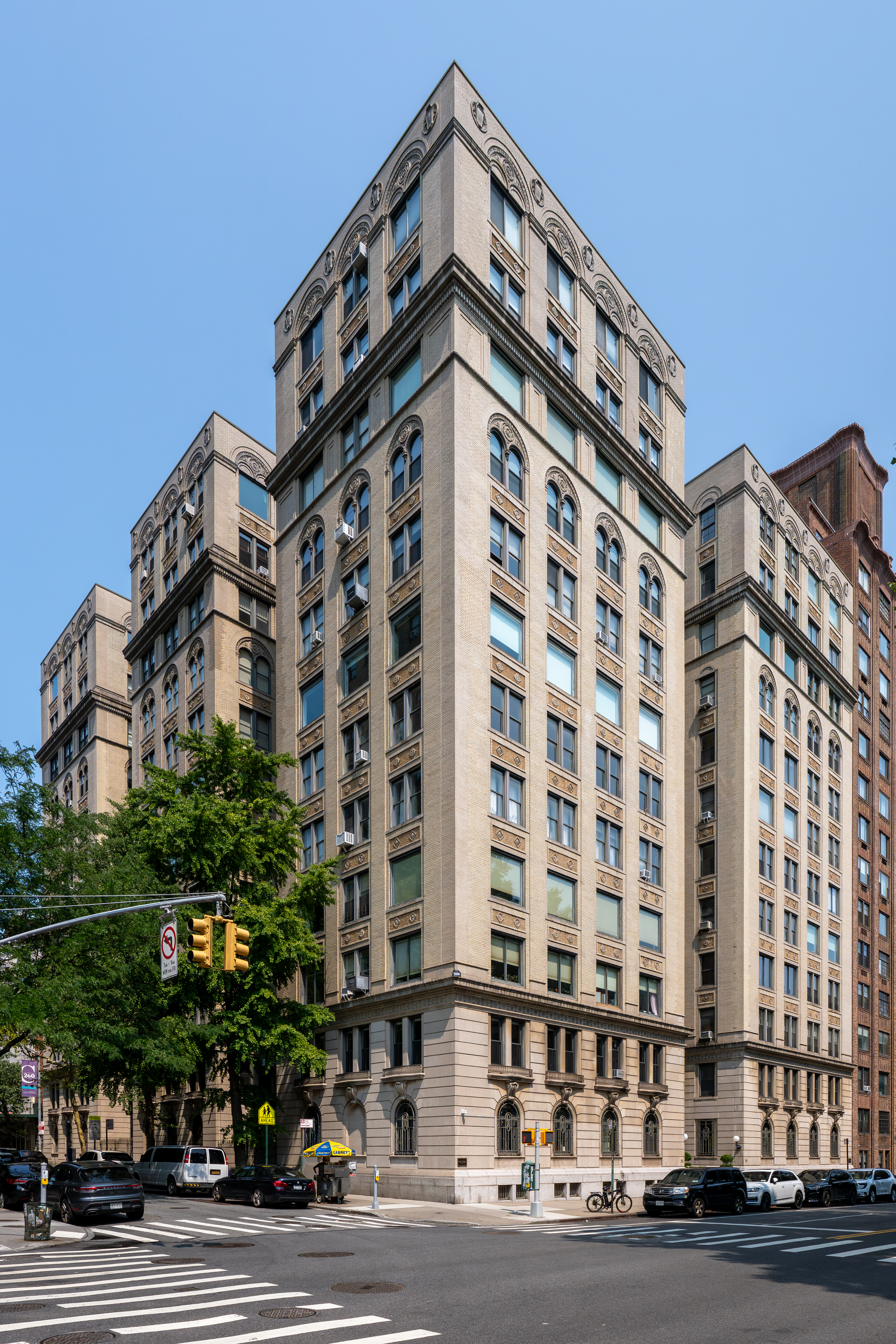
- Seen from Central Park West (2026)
- Interactive map of the The Turin area

General information
- Architectural style: Italian Renaissance Revivals
- Location: 333 Central Park West, New York City
- Completed: 1909

Technical details
- Floor count: 12

Design and construction
- Architect: Albert Joseph Bodker

The Turin is a residential luxury apartment building in New York City built in 1909. It is located on the Upper West Side of Manhattan at 333 Central Park West. The Turin is of Italian Renaissance style. The luxury co-op offers many amenities to its residents, including a 24-hour doorman, fitness center, children's playroom, storage room, and bike room.

== Architecture ==
The architect, Albert Joseph Bodker, erected it as 12 stories consisting of 72 units, offering 5 to 9 room residences. The building layout features an “H” design with four connected towers. The main entrance features a deep garden courtyard leading to a step-up lobby.

Because it is only twelve stories, The Turin is considered short for a Central Park West apartment building.

The building features many turn of the 20th century architectural details, including a 2-story limestone base embellished with male and female figures, arched windows on the first floor, and the second floor boasts attractive ornamental wrought iron planting window balconies.

== New Yorker article ==
The Turin was the subject of a February 1995 article in The New Yorker magazine written by Jane Kramer. The article shed light on the remarkably dangerous, overcrowded and extremely decrepit quality of The Turin in the 1950s and the renovation it went through to become what it is today. Kramer's article also exposed the political leanings of The Turin's 1960s residents, which included journalists Alexander Cockburn and Andrew Cockburn.

Kramer highlighted that after the building's renovation, millionaires of the 1980s and 1990s moved into the building.

== Notable residents ==
=== Former ===
- Arthur Gold
- William Hurt
- Pauline Kael
- Michael Heidelberger
- Milbourne Christopher
- Sandor Rado
- Joe Julian
- Rene d'Harnoncourt
- Marinka Gurewitch
- Alexander Cockburn
- Andrew Cockburn
- Marx W. Wartofsky
- Ruth Messinger
- Martin Smith (documentarian)
- Linda Prine
- Margot Adler
- Louis Goldstein
- Alan Ternes
