= Turin (village), New York =

Turin, New York Turin Four Corners
- Village
- Location within New York Location within the United States
- Coordinates: 43°37′44″N 75°24′34″W
- Country: United States
- State: New York
- County: Lewis
- Town: Turin

Area
  - Total: 1.03 sq mi (2.66 km^{2})
  - Land: 1.03 sq mi (2.66 km^{2})
  - Water: 0 sq mi (0.00 km^{2})
- Elevation: 1,263 ft (385 m)

Population (2020)
  - Total: 197
  - Density: 192.0/sq mi (74.12/km^{2})
- Time zone: UTC-5 (Eastern (EST))
  - Summer (DST): UTC-4 (EDT)
- ZIP code: 13473
- Area code: 315
- FIPS code: 36-75682
- GNIS feature ID: 967950
- Website: https://villageofturin.gov/

Turin is a village in Lewis County, New York, United States. The village is within the town of Turin and is north of the city of Rome. As of the 2010 census, the village population was 232.

== History ==
The village was previously called "Turin Four Corners". The early village was the location of three gristmills.

== Geography ==
The village of Turin is located on the southern edge of the town of Turin at 43°37′44″N 75°24′33″W (43.628921, -75.409355). The village is located on New York State Route 26 (State Street), which leads north 12 miles (19 km) to Lowville, the county seat, and south 30 miles (48 km) to Rome.

According to the United States Census Bureau, the village has a total area of 1.0 square mile (2.7 km^{2}), all land. Mill Creek, a tributary of the Black River, flows through the northern side of the village.

== Demographics ==
Historical population
Census	Pop.	Note	%±
1870	552		—
1880	419		−24.1%
1890	359		−14.3%
1900	363		1.1%
1910	349		−3.9%
1920	327		−6.3%
1930	260		−20.5%
1940	247		−5.0%
1950	273		10.5%
1960	323		18.3%
1970	293		−9.3%
1980	284		−3.1%
1990	295		3.9%
2000	263		−10.8%
2010	232		−11.8%
2020	197		−15.1%
U.S. Decennial Census

As of the census of 2000, there were 263 people, 101 households, and 73 families residing in the village. The population density was 257.2 inhabitants per square mile (99.3/km^{2}). There were 134 housing units at an average density of 131.1 per square mile (50.6/km^{2}). The racial makeup of the village was 99.24% White, 0.38% Native American and 0.38% Asian.

There were 101 households, out of which 30.7% had children under the age of 18 living with them, 52.5% were married couples living together, 15.8% had a female householder with no husband present, and 27.7% were non-families. 23.8% of all households were made up of individuals, and 10.9% had someone living alone who was 65 years of age or older. The average household size was 2.60 and the average family size was 3.07.

In the village, the population was spread out, with 28.9% under the age of 18, 7.2% from 18 to 24, 20.5% from 25 to 44, 25.9% from 45 to 64, and 17.5% who were 65 years of age or older. The median age was 41 years. For every 100 females, there were 90.6 males. For every 100 females age 18 and over, there were 98.9 males.

The median income for a household in the village was $36,250, and the median income for a family was $42,500. Males had a median income of $25,000 versus $22,500 for females. The per capita income for the village was $14,157. About 11.4% of families and 10.0% of the population were below the poverty line, including 15.7% of those under the age of eighteen and 5.9% of those 65 or over.
