= Cape Vincent, New York =

- Town
- Location within New York Location within the United States
- Coordinates: 44°07′40″N 76°20′00″W
- Country: United States
- State: New York
- County: Jefferson

Government
  - Town Supervisor: Debra Suller (R)
  - Town Council: Members: Paul Aubertine (D); Marty T. Mason (R); Daniel Wiley (D); Edward Bender (R)

Area
  - Total: 89.78 sq mi (232.53 km^{2})
  - Land: 56.28 sq mi (145.76 km^{2})
  - Water: 33.50 sq mi (86.77 km^{2})

Population (2020)
  - Total: 2,765
- Time zone: UTC-5 (EST)
  - Summer (DST): UTC-4 (EDT)
- ZIP Codes: 13618 (Cape Vincent); 13624 (Clayton)
- Area code(s): 315 & 680
- FIPS code: 36-045-12364
- Website: townofcapevincent.gov

Cape Vincent is a town in Jefferson County, New York, United States. The population was 2,765 at the 2020 census.

The town is in the northwestern part of the county. In the town is a village also called Cape Vincent. Both town and village are northwest of Watertown.

== History ==
The town was first explored in the 17th century by French explorers and missionaries. At that time, it was home to the Onondaga people. Modern settlement began in 1801 at Millens Bay.

During the War of 1812, Cape Vincent served as an armed camp to oppose the British forces in adjacent Kingston, Ontario.

The town was formed in 1849 from the north part of the town of Lyme. In 1895, the hamlet of Cape Vincent incorporated as a village. By that time, the region was becoming a famous tourist area due to the Thousand Islands.

In 1935, the East Charity Shoals Light was erected at the entrance to the Seaway.

The Xavier Chevalier House, Nicholas Cocaigne House, Remy Dezengremel House, Joseph Docteur House, James Buckley House, E. K. Burnham House, Reuter Dyer House, East Charity Shoal Light, Johnson House, Captain Louis Peugnet House, George Reynolds House, Rogers Brothers Farmstead, Tibbetts Point Light, Union Meeting House, Claude Vautrin House, and Warren Wilson House are listed on the National Register of Historic Places.

== Geography ==
According to the United States Census Bureau, the town has a total area of 89.8 square miles (232.7 km^{2}), of which 56.4 square miles (146.0 km^{2}) are land and 33.5 square miles (86.8 km^{2}), or 37.28%, are water. The northwestern border of the town is the St. Lawrence River, and the western border is Lake Ontario. Much of the town is on a peninsula projecting into Lake Ontario, where the lake enters the river. The southern section of the peninsula is in the neighboring town of Lyme. Facing the town across the St. Lawrence River is Wolfe Island, the largest of the Thousand Islands. The island is in Frontenac County, Ontario, Canada.

New York State Route 12E runs along the St. Lawrence River before it turns southeast at Cape Vincent village.

== Demographics ==
Historical population
Census	Pop.	Note	%±
1850	3,044		—
1860	3,585		17.8%
1870	3,342		−6.8%
1880	3,143		−6.0%
1890	3,014		−4.1%
1900	2,882		−4.4%
1910	2,575		−10.7%
1920	2,111		−18.0%
1930	1,958		−7.2%
1940	1,954		−0.2%
1950	1,842		−5.7%
1960	1,756		−4.7%
1970	1,748		−0.5%
1980	1,823		4.3%
1990	2,768		51.8%
2000	3,345		20.8%
2010	2,777		−17.0%
2020	2,765		−0.4%
U.S. Decennial Census 2020

As of the census of 2000, there were 3,345 people, 867 households, and 601 families residing in the town. The population density was 59.2 inhabitants per square mile (22.9/km^{2}). There were 2,783 housing units at an average density of 49.3 per square mile (19.0/km^{2}). The racial makeup of the town was 70.64% White, 21.88% African American, 0.39% Native American, 0.36% Asian, 6.28% from other races, and 0.45% from two or more races. Hispanic or Latino of any race were 13.27% of the population.

There were 867 households, out of which 25.7% had children under the age of 18 living with them, 56.6% were married couples living together, 8.1% had a female householder with no husband present, and 30.6% were non-families. 27.0% of all households were made up of individuals, and 13.5% had someone living alone who was 65 years of age or older. The average household size was 2.36 and the average family size was 2.83.

In the town, the population was spread out, with 13.2% under the age of 18, 8.7% from 18 to 24, 43.3% from 25 to 44, 22.4% from 45 to 64, and 12.4% who were 65 years of age or older. The median age was 38 years. For every 100 females, there were 216.8 males. For every 100 females age 18 and over, there were 251.8 males.

The median income for a household in the town was $37,330, and the median income for a family was $43,558. Males had a median income of $42,361 versus $22,308 for females. The per capita income for the town was $16,375. About 8.5% of families and 12.3% of the population were below the poverty line, including 20.0% of those under age 18 and 11.1% of those age 65 or over.

== Communities and locations in the town ==
- Burnham Point State Park – A park on the St. Lawrence River across the channel from the eastern shores of Carlton Island.
- Carleton Island – An island in the St. Lawrence River opposite Burnham Point State Park. It was the site of the earliest settlement in Jefferson County, known as "King's Garden", where a fort was built in the late 17th century.
- Cedar Point State Park – A state park on the St. Lawrence River near the eastern town line.
- Cape Vincent – A village in the northwestern part of the town on NY-12E. It had a railroad station from 1852 until the mid 20th century.
- Dablon Point – A headland on Lake Ontario between Mud Bay and Wilson Bay.
- Fox Island – A 263-acre (1.06 km^{2}) island in Lake Ontario, southeast of Grenadier Island; once owned by former New York Governor Horace White; island auctioned off August 24, 2007, for $3.78 million to Vance Wilson, who claims he will keep the estate as it currently is.
- Fuller Bay – A bay of Lake Ontario at the western end of Cape Vincent peninsula.
- Grenadier Island – A large island in Lake Ontario, southwest of Cape Vincent. It was an important military installation in the War of 1812.
- Kents Creek – A stream flowing southwest to enter Lake Ontario at Mud Bay.
- Millens Bay – A location northeast of Sunnybank on NY-12E.
- Mud Bay – A bay of Lake Ontario at the western end of Cape Vincent peninsula.
- Ponds Corners – A location at the junction of County Roads 8 and 56 in the southwestern part of the town.
- Rosiere – A hamlet near the southeastern town line on County Road 4. One of the former stations on the old Rome, Watertown and Ogdensburg Railroad.
- St. Lawrence – A hamlet near the eastern town line on County Road 4. It was originally called "St. Oars' Corners", "Gotham's Corners", and "Crane's Corners".
- Sunnybank – A hamlet located on the south bank of the St. Lawrence River, northeast of Cape Vincent village on NY-12E.
- Tibbets Point – A headland on Lake Ontario, north of Wilson Point. The lighthouse marking the entrance to the St. Lawrence Seaway is now a youth hostel operated by Hostelling International USA.
- Warren Settlement – A hamlet on County Road 4 near the town center. It was settled circa 1825 by members of the Warren family.
- Wilson Bay – A bay of Lake Ontario at the western end of Cape Vincent peninsula.
- Wilson Point – A headland on Lake Ontario at the northern headland of Wilson Bay.
