= Captain Lou (disambiguation) =

Lou Albano (1933–2009), popularly known as "Captain Lou", was an Italian-born American professional wrestler, wrestling manager and actor

Captain Lou may also refer to:

- "Captain Lou", a song by NRBQ from the album Lou and the Q, about Albano
- "Captain Lou", a song by Kimya Dawson from the album Thunder Thighs, also about Albano
- "Captain Lou's Corner", an interview segment hosted by Lou Albano on the UWF Fury Hour program from 1990 to 1991

== See also ==
- Captain Louie, a musical by Stephen Schwartz
- Louis Nolan (1818–1854), a captain in the British Army
- Captain Louis Peugnet House, a farmhouse in Cape Vincent, New York, listed on the National Register of Historic Places
