= Dyer House =

Dyer House can refer to several different structures:

- Nathaniel Dyer House, a historic house in Portland, Maine, United States
- Reuter Dyer House, a historic house in Jefferson County, New York, United States
- Samuel Dyer House, a historic house in Castle Rock, Colorado, United States
