= Herrick Township, Pennsylvania =

Herrick Township is the name of some places in the U.S. state of Pennsylvania:

- Herrick Township, Bradford County, Pennsylvania
- Herrick Township, Susquehanna County, Pennsylvania
