= Vincent LeRay House =

Historic building in New York, US

- U.S. National Register of Historic Places
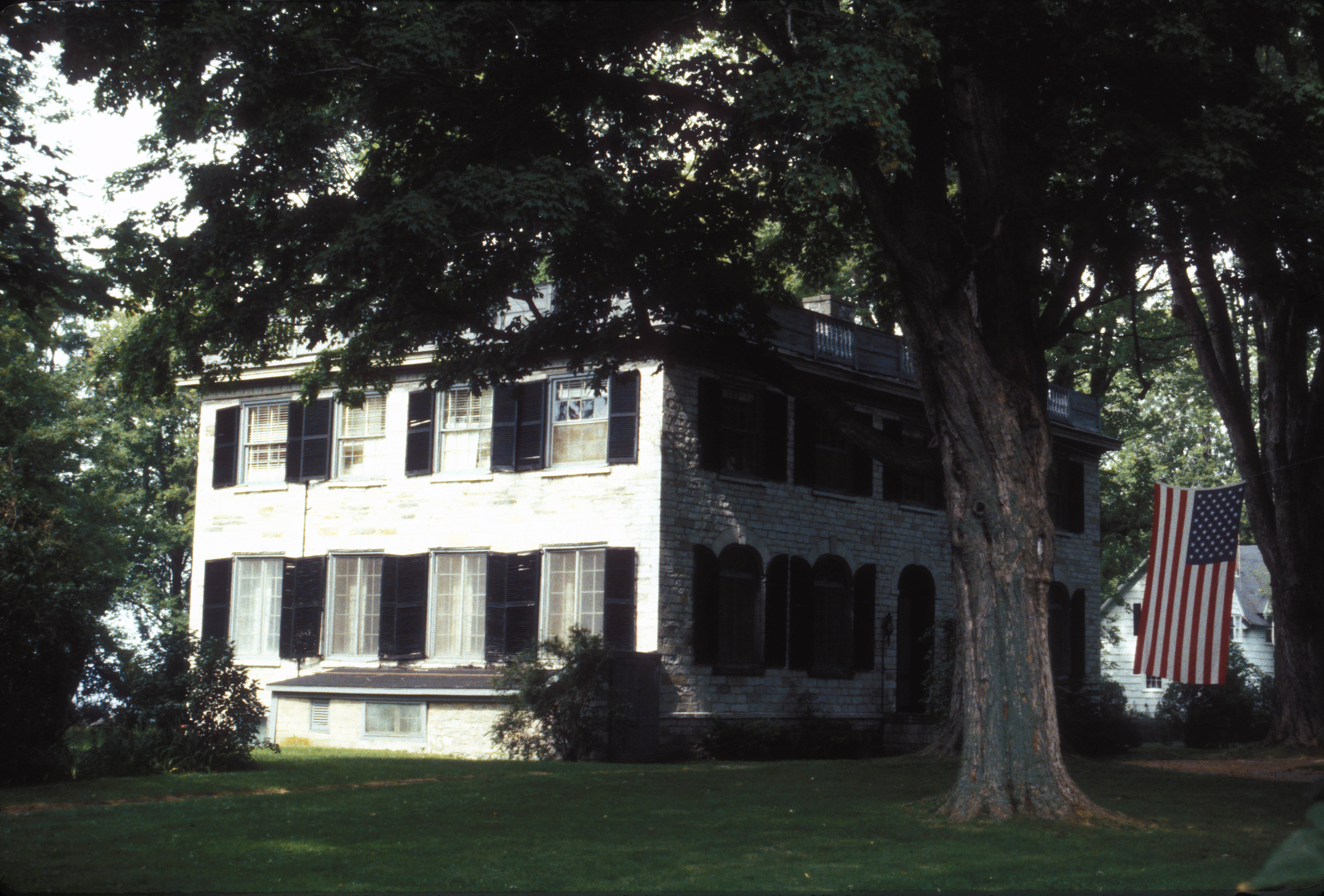

- Location within New York Location within the United States
- Location: Broadway (NY 12E), Cape Vincent, New York
- Coordinates: 44°7′31″N 76°20′34″W
- Area: 4 acres (1.6 ha)
- Built: ca. 1815
- MPS: Cape Vincent Town and Village MRA
- NRHP reference No.: 73001195
- Added to NRHP: November 15, 1973

Vincent LeRay House, also known as The Stone House, is a historic home located at Cape Vincent in Jefferson County, New York. It is located within the boundaries of the Broadway Historic District.

== Construction and Physical Properties ==
The home was built in 1815 by James D. LeRay for his son, Vincent. The home is a 2 1/2-story, five-by-four-bay stone building. Also on the property is a limestone boathouse, a 2-story stucco cottage, and board and batten garage.

== Historical significance ==
Vincent left the house vacant when he moved into his father's mansion in LeRaysville. In 1873, Vincent sold the house to the Peugnet family. The home remained in their possession until the 20th century. The home was later listed on the National Register of Historic Places on November 15, 1973.
