= Mary Chandler Atherton =

American educator; textbook author (1849–1934)

Mary Alderson Chandler Atherton
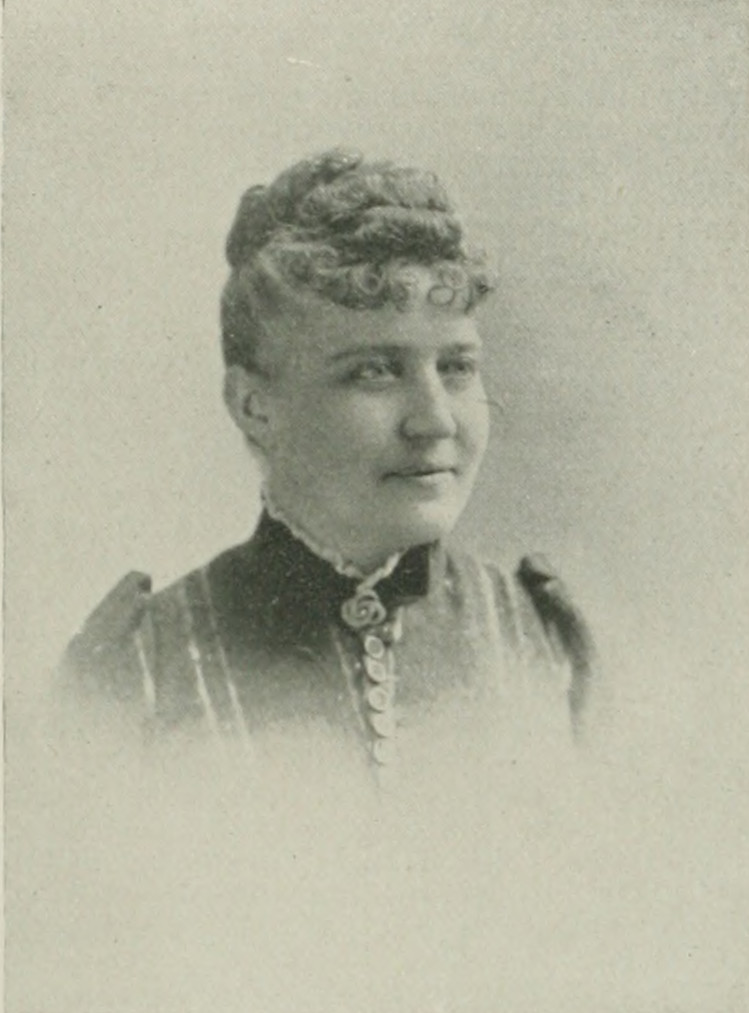
- Portrait from A Woman of the Century
- Born: Mary Alderson; April 16, 1849; Le Raysville, Pennsylvania, U.S.
- Died: September 9, 1934 (aged 85); San Diego, California, U.S.
- Education: State Normal School, Mansfield, Pennsylvania
- Occupations: educator; author; school and magazine founder
- Spouses: Willard Wayne Chandler (m. 1881; died 1889); Frederick Atherton (m. 1903)
- Writing career
- Genre: Textbook
- Subject: Shorthand
- Notable works: Practical Shorthand for Schools and Colleges

Mary Alderson Chandler Atherton (née, Alderson; after first marriage, Chandler; after second marriage, Atherton; April 16, 1849 – September 9, 1934) was an American educator, textbook author, and magazine publisher. She arrived in Boston, Massachusetts in 1881. There, she founded the "Home School for Shorthand and Typewriting" (1883), and ten years later, the "Chandler Normal Shorthand School", chiefly for the training of teachers, the first school of its kind in the U.S. In 1895, Atherton called a "Public School Shorthand Convention", the first in the history of shorthand education. Also in that year, she founded the Chandler Thinking Club for the encouragement of independent thinking. She published two periodicals and five textbooks.

== Early life and education ==
Mary Alderson was born near Le Raysville, Pennsylvania, April 16, 1849. Her parents, John Alderson (1805–1881) and Margaret (Wilson) Alderson (1805–1888), were both natives of Sedbergh, England. Atherton's birthplace was 20 miles (32 km) from any town of importance, the only connection with which was the stagecoach. When other children of her age were profiting by proximity to the railroad, the telegraph, music, art, literature and other facilities for education, she was peering through the small windows of her stone house, dreaming of places beyond home. Her parents were plain people, whose wealth, they used to say, lay chiefly in their children, of whom there were eight boys and three girls, Atherton's siblings being James, Joshua, Elizabeth, Henry, George, Franklin, and Frederick.

Her education began in the typical country school, open three months in winter and three in summer. It was continued at the village academy one term and at the Orwell Hill graded school three terms, a teacher's certificate then being granted her at the age of fifteen. At sixteen, or as early as the law of the State of Pennsylvania permitted, she began teaching in a small country school in what was locally known as the "Cleveland District".

A letter came from an elder brother, who many years before had gone prospecting in the West. The letter said in part:—

"The little sister whom I left behind me years ago must be a young lady by this time, and I want her to be given an education. Send her away to school. Here is two hundred dollars and if I make a big stake, as I have a good show to do, will send more when needed."

Atherton eagerly seized the unexpected opportunity, entering the State Normal School, Mansfield, Pennsylvania (now, Mansfield University of Pennsylvania), graduating with the honors of her class in the spring of 1868.

== Career ==
=== Public school teacher ===
The first three years of her public life were spent in teaching in Venango City (since merged into Oil City, Pennsylvania) and Franklin. She then removed to California. In four weeks after her arrival, she began teaching in Galt, at a salary of US$75 per month. The next year found her, with an increased salary, at San Jose, where for several years, she held the position of vice-principal in the Empire School. Later, she went to the city of Oakland, where her career as a teacher in the public schools terminated finally.

=== Shorthand pioneer ===
Yearning for growth, she boarded an ocean steamer in 1880 and sailed out of San Francisco with the fixed purpose of entering upon a new, broader, and more useful career. Going first to Philadelphia in 1880, she spent one year in study in that city at the National School of Elocution and Oratory, and was graduated from there in 1881.

In 1881, now married, Mr. and Mrs. Chandler came to Boston as co-workers. Out of necessity, being widowed in 1889, she devoted herself into that educational work and turned out such qualified stenographers as to attract general attention. The system which she developed was not one of position nor of light lines, but employed both joined and disjoined vowels. As a rule, each outline stood for one word only, and was exceedingly legible as a consequence. Because of its exactness, uniformity and interchangeability, the notes of one Chandler writer could easily read by any one knowing the system.

Atherton wanted to establish a uniform shorthand in the public schools, and constantly worked toward this goal. The original planks of her shorthand educational platform were two –"Quality, not quantity" and "Legibility, not guessibility"- to which the following was subsequently added, “A uniform shorthand in the public schools". To this end, in Boston in 1883, she established "The Home School of Shorthand and Typewriting". This led to the publication of her Graded Lessons (Boston, 1888), and the first shorthand textbook, The Chandler Practical Shorthand for Schools and Colleges, which went through several editions and was extensively used in the public schools of New England. She taught her system in the Martha's Vineyard Summer Institute during the summer season of 1889–91.

In 1891, she introduced her system of shorthand into the Gloucester High School, where its merit was promptly recognized. In that year, she also organized the Chandler Shorthand Teachers' Association.

In 1893 founded the Chandler Normal Shorthand School in Boston for the training of teachers, the first school of its kind in the U.S. She directed it until 1917, when she gave up her connection with it, and it became the Chandler School for Women, with a wider field for women's education and training.

In 1895, Atherton called a Public School Shorthand Convention, the first in the history of shorthand education, and these were held annually in Boston since 1904. In 1914, she first published the Chandler Shorthand Quarterly in the interest of a rational uniform system. The 12th Annual Convention of Chandler Shorthand writers was held on May 8 in the St. James theatre, Boston, with an attendance of nearly 1,500.

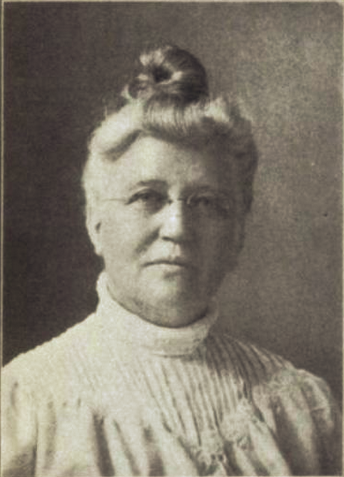
(1922)

Atherton was a natural leader and to the young, an unfailing source of inspiration. The high esteem in which she was held by those who came under her direct influence was indicated by the following extract from the constitution of the National Association of Chandler Shorthand Writers, organized in 1904:—

"The object of this association shall be to extend and perpetuate, through the means of a permanent organization, the valuable work which Mary Alderson Atherton has done for humanity in the interest of true education and characterbuilding."

==== Controversy ====
A veteran stenographer, writing to the Springfield, Massachusetts Union (1908), said in part:—

"Properly speaking, there is no such system of shorthand as the Chandler' system. This system is known to the shorthand fraternity as ""Lindsley's Takigraphy", Simple or Corresponding Style. It was invented by the late David Philip Lindsley and first published in book form during the early 1870s-before Mrs. Chandler knew anything about shorthand. She acquired her knowledge of it through Mr. Lindsley and his publications, and when the copyright expired she put it out as 'Chandler' shorthand. It is what is known as a corresponding style of shorthand, devised by Mr. Lindsley to replace longhand writing-a dream that has not as yet materialized. The shaded' stroke systems are the ones in most general use by professional reporters. The light-line systems have nothing of advantage."

In Shorthand Systems Analyzed: Gregg, Pitman, K.I., Paragon and Boyd Syllabic (1919), by the New York State Shorthand Reporters, the system is referred to as "Lindsley-Chandler".

== Personal life ==
She was twice married: first, in 1881, at Philadelphia to Willard Wayne Chandler (1858–1889)., of Boston, who died in 1889 of tuberculosis, and secondly, on May 25, 1903, to Frederick Atherton (1855–1939), a lawyer, of Boston.

Atherton was a member of the Massachusetts Woman Suffrage Association, and of the Free Religious Association. In 1895, she organized the Chandler Thinking Club, for the encouragement of individual growth, laying special emphasis on independent thinking, and in 1898, began the publication of The Thinker.

Mary Alderson Chandler Atherton died in San Diego, California, September 9, 1934.

== Selected works ==
=== Books ===
- Graded Lessons in Shorthand, 1888 (text)
- Key to Graded Lessons in Shorthand, 1889 (text)
- Practical Shorthand for Schools and Colleges, 1891
- Chandler's Practical Shorthand: A Series of Logical Steps, 1893
- Chandler Shorthand Revised, 1933

=== Magazine founder and publisher ===
- The Thinker (established 1898)
- Chandler Shorthand Quarterly (established 1914)
