= Warren Township, Pennsylvania =

Warren Township is the name of some places in the U.S. state of Pennsylvania:

- Warren Township, Bradford County, Pennsylvania
- Warren Township, Franklin County, Pennsylvania
