= General Sacket House =

Historic house in New York, United States

- U.S. National Register of Historic Places
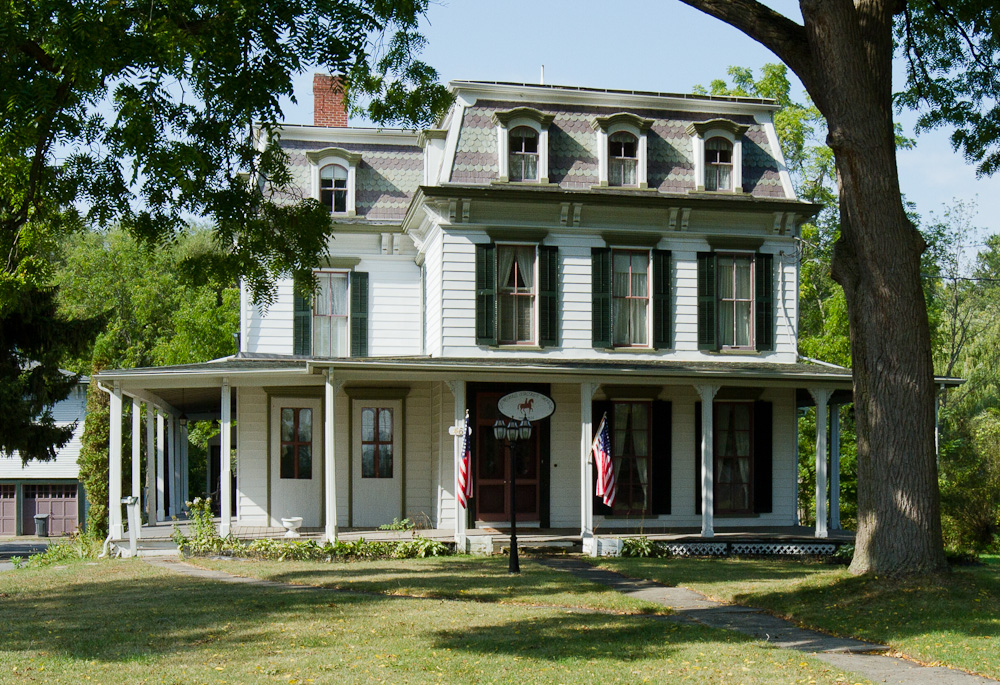
- General Sacket House, 2018

- Location within New York Location within the United States
- Location: 467 James St., Cape Vincent, New York
- Coordinates: 44°7′18″N 76°19′52″W
- Area: 3.6 acres (1.5 ha)
- Built: 1872
- Architect: Johnson, Fred A.
- Architectural style: Second Empire
- MPS: Cape Vincent Town and Village MRA
- NRHP reference No.: 85002464
- Added to NRHP: September 27, 1985

General Sacket House is a historic home located at Cape Vincent in Jefferson County, New York. It was built in 1872–75 and is a three-story, three-bay-wide, 25-room Second Empire style residence. It consists of a rectangular three-story main block with a two-story rear wing. The main block features a mansard roof pierced by round-headed dormers. Also on the property is the original two-story carriage house.

It was listed on the National Register of Historic Places in 1985.
