= Remy Dezengremel House =

Historic house in New York, United States

- U.S. National Register of Historic Places
- Location within New York
- Location: Rosiere Rd., Cape Vincent, New York
- Coordinates: 44°6′21″N 76°15′39″W
- Area: 227.7 acres (92.1 ha)
- Built: 1855
- Architect: Dezengremel, Remy, Jr.
- MPS: Cape Vincent Town and Village MRA
- NRHP reference No.: 85002459
- Added to NRHP: September 27, 1985

Remy Dezengremel House is a historic home and farm complex located at Cape Vincent in Jefferson County, New York. The limestone farmhouse was built in the 1850s and has three sections: a 1 1/2-story main block; a side wing and a 1-story ell off the wing. Also on the property are a barn, silo, and shed.

It was listed on the National Register of Historic Places in 1985.
