= Broadway Historic District (Cape Vincent, New York) =

Historic district in New York, United States

- U.S. National Register of Historic Places
- U.S. Historic district
- Location within New York Location within the United States
- Location: St. Lawrence River, W. edge of Village of Cape Vincent, on Broadway & Tibbetts Point, Cape Vincent, New York
- Coordinates: 44°7′26″N 76°20′44″W
- Area: 22 acres (8.9 ha)
- Architectural style: Greek Revival, Colonial, French Colonial
- MPS: Cape Vincent Town and Village MRA
- NRHP reference No.: 85002455
- Added to NRHP: September 27, 1985

Broadway Historic District is a national historic district located at Cape Vincent in Jefferson County, New York, United States. The district includes six contributing buildings and one contributing structure; three high style residences and four contributing outbuildings. Located within the district is the separately listed Vincent LeRay House.

It was listed on the National Register of Historic Places in 1985.
