= Levi Anthony Building =

Historic commercial building in New York, United States

- U.S. National Register of Historic Places
- Location within New York Location within the United States
- Location: Broadway, Cape Vincent, New York
- Coordinates: 44°7′47″N 76°19′47″W
- Area: less than one acre
- Built: 1884
- Architectural style: Italianate
- MPS: Cape Vincent Town and Village MRA
- NRHP reference No.: 85002451
- Added to NRHP: September 27, 1985

The Levi Anthony Building is a historic commercial building located on Broadway in Cape Vincent in Jefferson County, New York.

== Description and history ==
It is a three-story, five bay wide masonry structure, built in 1884 in the Italianate style of architecture.

It was listed on the National Register of Historic Places on September 27, 1985.
