= Cornelius Sacket House =

Historic house in New York, United States

- U.S. National Register of Historic Places
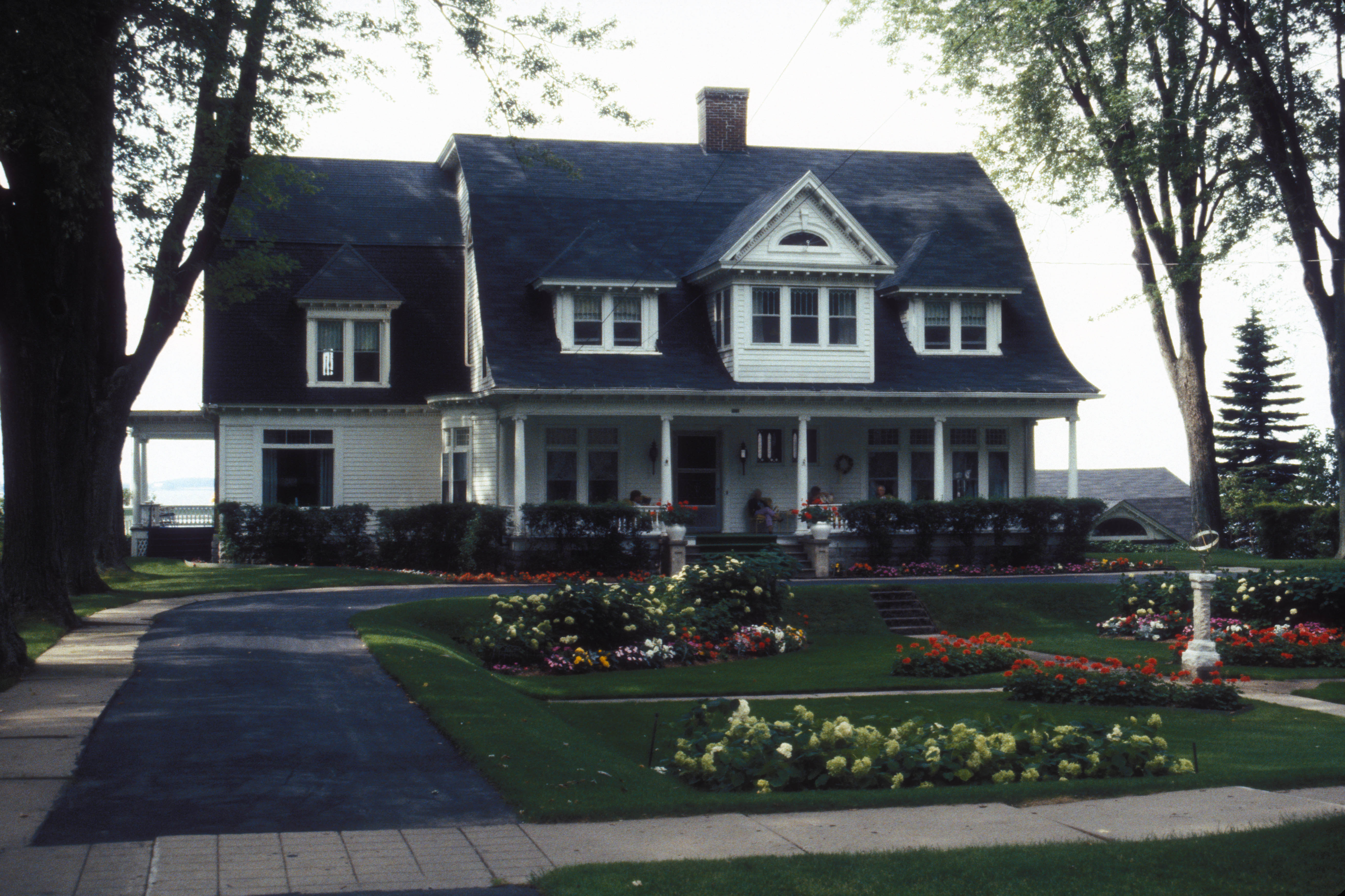

- Location within New York Location within the United States
- Location: 571 Broadway, Cape Vincent, New York
- Coordinates: 44°7′46″N 76°19′58″W
- Area: less than one acre
- Built: 1900
- Architectural style: Colonial Revival
- MPS: Cape Vincent Town and Village MRA
- NRHP reference No.: 85002473
- Added to NRHP: September 27, 1985

Cornelius Sacket House is a historic home located at Cape Vincent in Jefferson County, New York. It was built about 1900 and is a 1 1/2-story Dutch Colonial Revival–style residence with a gambrel roof and clapboard siding. It features a 1-story open porch with five fluted Ionic columns. Also on the property is a boathouse and formal sunken garden.

It was listed on the National Register of Historic Places in 1985.
