= St. John the Baptist Roman Catholic Church (Plattsburgh, New York) =

Historic church in New York, United States

- St. John the Baptist Roman Catholic Church and Rectory
- U.S. National Register of Historic Places
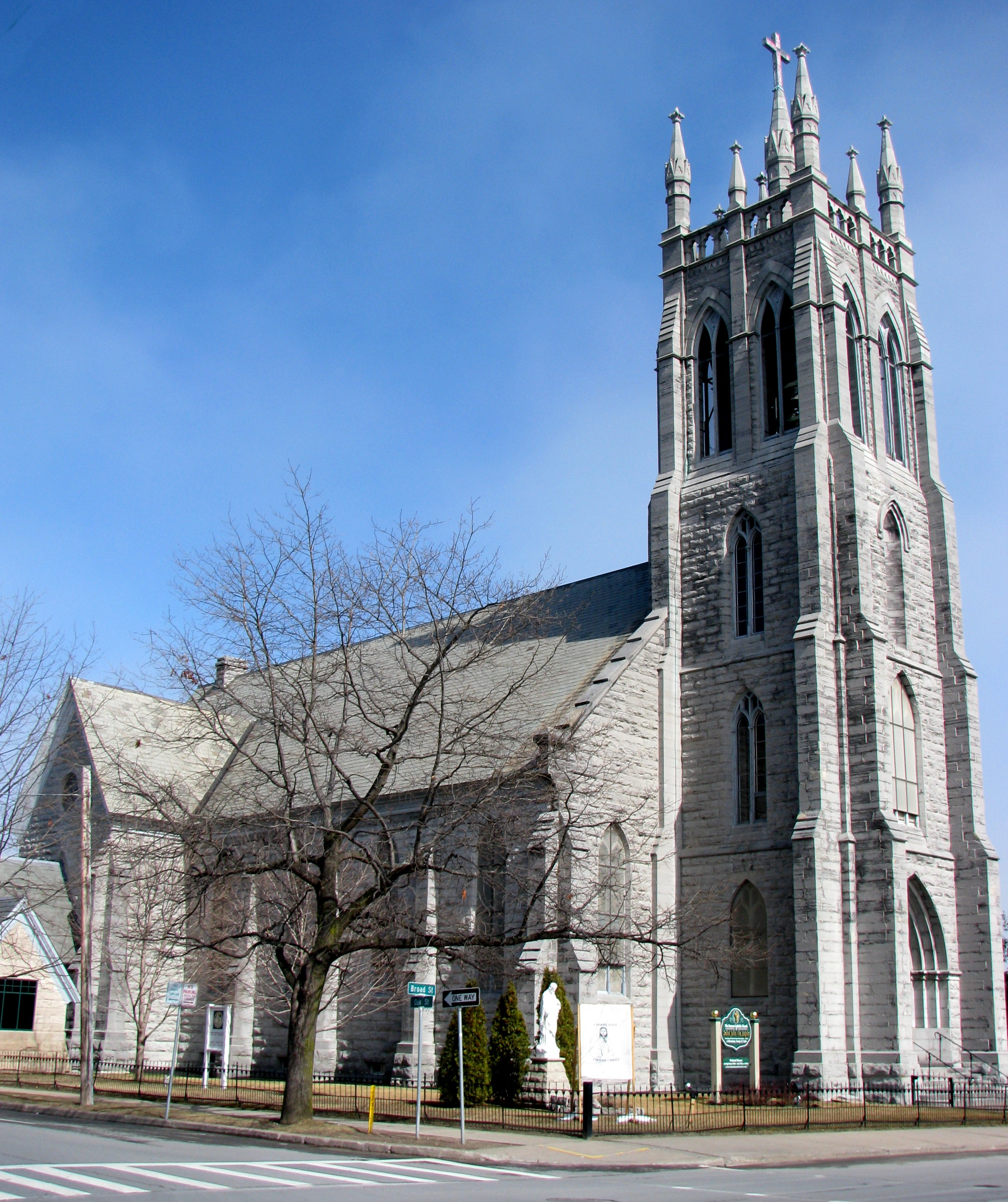
- St. John the Baptist Roman Catholic Church

- Location within New York Location within the United States
- Location: 20 Broad St., Plattsburgh, New York
- Coordinates: 44°41′44″N 73°27′17″W
- Area: 1 acre (0.40 ha)
- Built: 1874
- Architectural style: Colonial Revival, Gothic Revival, Quebecois
- MPS: Plattsburgh City MRA
- NRHP reference No.: 82001112
- Added to NRHP: November 12, 1982

St. John the Baptist Roman Catholic Church and Rectory is a historic Roman Catholic church and rectory located at 20 Broad Street in Plattsburgh, Clinton County, New York. Both structures were added to the National Register of Historic Places as one record in 1982.

== Description ==
The imposing masonry church was built in 1874. Cruciform in plan with Gothic Revival pointed arches and buttresses. It features a spired tower surmounted by a stone cross finial.

The rectory was built between 1909–1910 and is a three-story, rectangular-in-plan masonry structure that features a half-mansard roof with balcony. The rectory has an unusual combination of Colonial Revival and Gothic Revival features.
