= John Borland House =

Historic house in New York, United States

- U.S. National Register of Historic Places
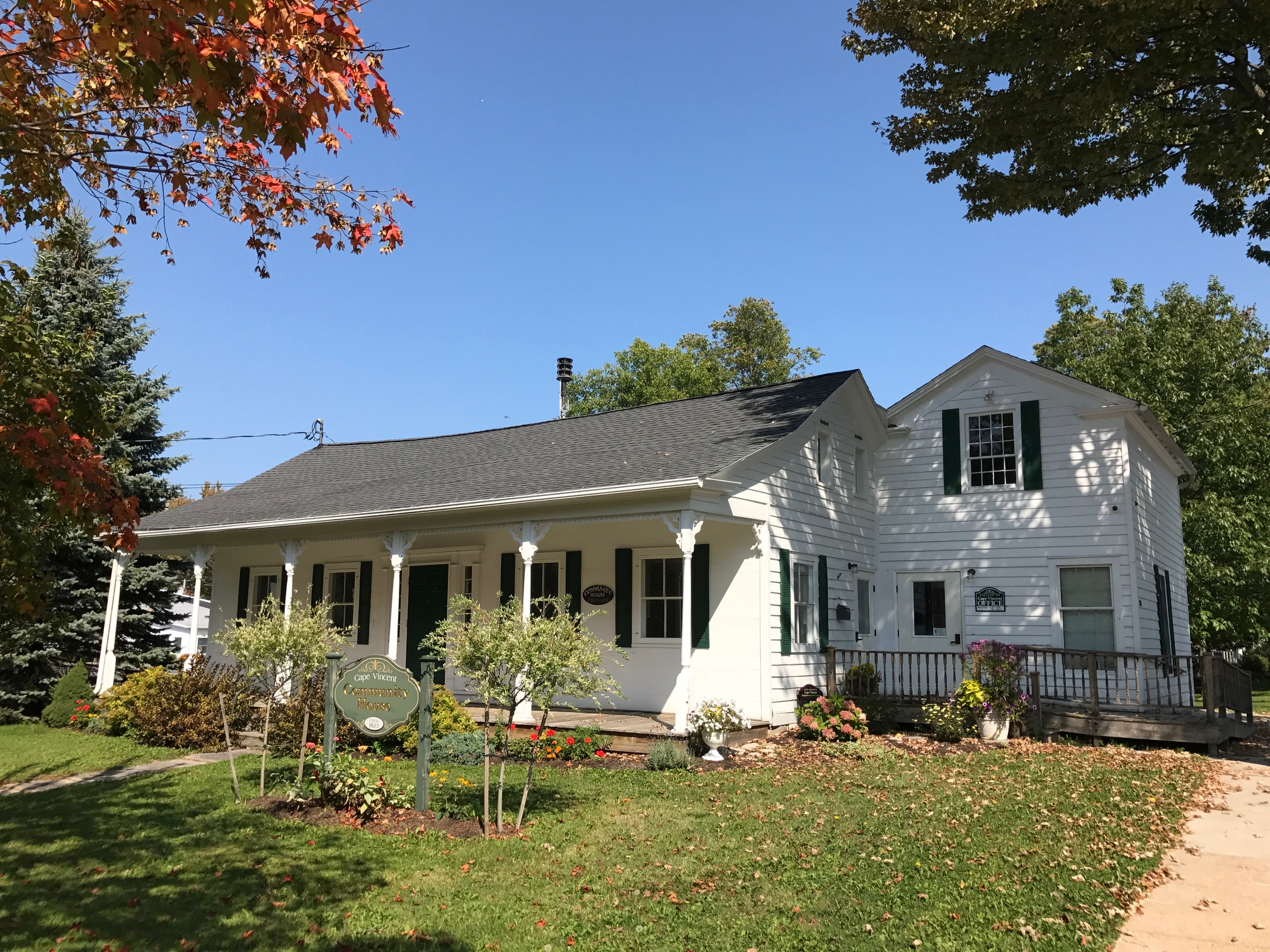

- Location within New York Location within the United States
- Location: Market St., Cape Vincent, New York
- Coordinates: 44°7′36″N 76°20′12″W
- Area: less than one acre
- Built: c. 1823
- Architectural style: Federal
- MPS: Cape Vincent Town and Village MRA
- NRHP reference No.: 85002453
- Added to NRHP: September 27, 1985

The John Borland House is a historic house located on Market Street in Cape Vincent, Jefferson County, New York.

== Description and history ==
It is a 1 1/2-story, five-bay-wide, wood-framed single dwelling with a gabled roof. It was constructed between 1818 and 1828 in a vernacular Federal style. It has a 1 1/2-story ell attached to the south side that exhibits Greek Revival details. In 1937, Stuyvesant Fish donated the house to the village for use as a community center.

It was listed on the National Register of Historic Places on September 27, 1985.
