= Cape Vincent (village), New York =

Cape Vincent, New York
- Village
- Location within New York Location within the United States
- Coordinates: 44°7′40″N 76°20′0″W
- Country: United States
- State: New York
- County: Jefferson
- Town: Cape Vincent

Area
  - Total: 0.73 sq mi (1.89 km^{2})
  - Land: 0.70 sq mi (1.82 km^{2})
  - Water: 0.027 sq mi (0.07 km^{2})
- Elevation: 260 ft (80 m)

Population (2020)
  - Total: 699
  - Density: 994.0/sq mi (383.78/km^{2})
- Time zone: UTC-5 (Eastern (EST))
  - Summer (DST): UTC-4 (EDT)
- ZIP code: 13618
- Area code: 315
- FIPS code: 36-12353
- GNIS feature ID: 0945801
- Website: villageofcapevincent.gov

Cape Vincent is a village in Jefferson County, New York, United States. The population was 726 at the 2010 census. The village is in the west-central part of the town of Cape Vincent and is northwest of Watertown.

== History ==
The area was formerly controlled by the Onondaga people. French missionaries and explorers passed through the area in the middle of the 17th century.

The town of Cape Vincent was originally part of the town of Lyme. In 1849 the town of Cape Vincent separated from Lyme. The village of Cape Vincent was incorporated in 1853. At the time of its incorporation the village had a population of 1,218.

By the end of the 19th century, the area was becoming a vacation land due to the nearby Thousand Islands.

The Levi Anthony Building, Aubertine Building, John Borland House, Broadway Historic District, James Buckley House, E. K. Burnham House, Duvillard Mill, First Presbyterian Society of Cape Vincent, Fort Haldimand Site, Jean Philippe Galband du Fort House, Glen Building, Vincent LeRay House, Lewis House, Roxy Hotel, Cornelius Sacket House, General Sacket House, St. John's Episcopal Church, St. Vincent of Paul Catholic Church, and Otis Starkey House are listed on the National Register of Historic Places.

== Geography ==
According to the United States Census Bureau, Cape Vincent has a total area of 0.73 square miles (1.9 km^{2}), of which 0.02 square miles (0.06 km^{2}), or 3.31%, are water. The village is on the south bank of the St. Lawrence River. A seasonal ferry connected the village to Point Alexandria on Wolfe Island in Ontario, Canada, 1 mile (1.6 km) from Cape Vincent across the southern channel of the St. Lawrence up till late fall 2024 before it shut down permanently after the owner of the company passed away. It is not known if anyone will take up the ferry operation.

New York State Route 12E passes through the village center, leading northeast (downstream) along the St. Lawrence 15 miles (24 km) to Clayton and southeast 25 miles (40 km) to Watertown, the Jefferson county seat.

== Demographics ==
Historical population
Census	Pop.	Note	%±
1840	500		—
1860	1,026		—
1870	1,269		23.7%
1880	1,361		7.2%
1890	1,324		−2.7%
1900	1,310		−1.1%
1910	1,155		−11.8%
1920	913		−21.0%
1930	898		−1.6%
1940	931		3.7%
1950	812		−12.8%
1960	770		−5.2%
1970	820		6.5%
1980	785		−4.3%
1990	683		−13.0%
2000	760		11.3%
2010	726		−4.5%
2020	699		−3.7%
U.S. Decennial Census

As of the census of 2000, there were 760 people, 348 households, and 209 families residing in the village. There is one local bank (Citizens' Bank of Cape Vincent), a small museum, a post office (ZIP 13618), an independent telephone exchange and a few small stores.

The population density was 1,037.5 inhabitants per square mile (400.6/km^{2}). There were 502 housing units at an average density of 685.3 per square mile (264.6/km^{2}). The racial makeup of the village was 98.68% White, 0.13% Black or African American, 0.13% Asian, and 1.05% from two or more races. Hispanic or Latino of any race were 0.53% of the population.

There were 348 households, out of which 24.1% had children under the age of 18 living with them, 43.7% were married couples living together, 12.4% had a female householder with no husband present, and 39.7% were non-families. 35.9% of all households were made up of individuals, and 20.1% had someone living alone who was 65 years of age or older. The average household size was 2.16 and the average family size was 2.77.

In the village, the population was spread out, with 22.2% under the age of 18, 5.8% from 18 to 24, 23.7% from 25 to 44, 24.1% from 45 to 64, and 24.2% who were 65 years of age or older. The median age was 43 years. For every 100 females, there were 83.6 males. For every 100 females age 18 and over, there were 81.8 males.

The median income for a household in the village was $31,833, and the median income for a family was $38,571. Males had a median income of $31,538 versus $23,125 for females. The per capita income for the village was $17,492. About 12.7% of families and 16.4% of the population were below the poverty line, including 27.3% of those under age 18 and 14.1% of those age 65 or over.

== Transportation ==
New York State Route 12E passes through the village.

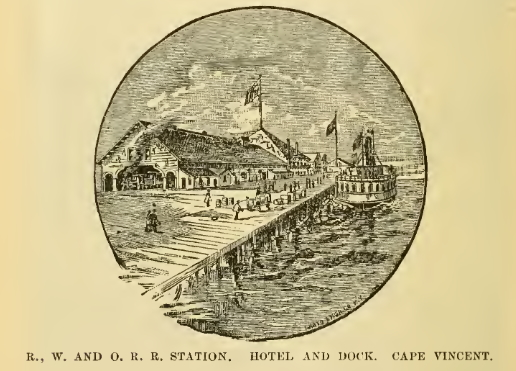
Engraving of the R,W&O Railroad station, hotel and ferry dock in Cape Vincent

Beginning in April 1852, the Cape Vincent branch of the Rome, Watertown & Ogdensburg Railroad (RW&O) conveyed both passengers and freight between the waterfront and Watertown (and on to Rome) via Chaumont and Brownville. The Watertown-Cape Vincent branch was a vital link from the southern part of the state to the ferry terminal to Canada. However, its importance was reduced with the company's acquisition of the Utica & Black River Railroad (with its depot in Clayton) in 1886. By 1891 the railroad became a subsidiary of the New York Central Railroad. In 1895, a storm blew down the Cape Vincent station building, killing two inside.

From the early part of the 20th century onward, traffic decreased until the New York Central ended its passenger service to the village in March 1936, after which, Clayton, to the east, became the main launch point for rail to ferry connections. Freight operations closed in the early 1950s. The second and final station building, having served its original purpose for over 40 years, stood on the waterfront; till late fall of 2024 or early 2025 before being demolished its last function was the office for Anchor Marina.

=== Ferry ===
The privately owned Horne's Ferry, the only international ferry across the St. Lawrence River, ran from May to October to Cape Vincent from "Horne's Point" (Point Alexandria) on Wolfe Island, Ontario, Canada, in the Thousand Islands. The capacity is about twelve cars. The family-owned ferry had been running since 1802 when they were first licensed to operate between Wolfe Island and Cape Vincent (as well as Wolfe Island and Kingston, Ontario). The cost as of 2013 was US$15 for one car and driver.

The ferry service was interrupted in 2025 after owner George Horne died, with plans for its reinstatement uncertain. In September that year, the Village of Cape Vincent agreed to purchase the New York terminal, while negotiations by the Township of Frontenac Islands for the Ontario terminal were ongoing.

Another ferry on the opposite side of Wolfe Island runs year-round free of charge and completed the crossing between Marysville and Kingston. The total time for both ferry crossings was a little over an hour.

== Education ==
The school district is the Thousand Islands Central School District.

== Notable person ==
- Delos B. Sackett, a career U.S. Army officer who was a general in the Union Army during the Civil War.

== Bibliography ==
- History of Cape Vincent, Cape Vincent Historical Museum (2002).
