= Otis Starkey House =

Historic house in New York, United States

- U.S. National Register of Historic Places
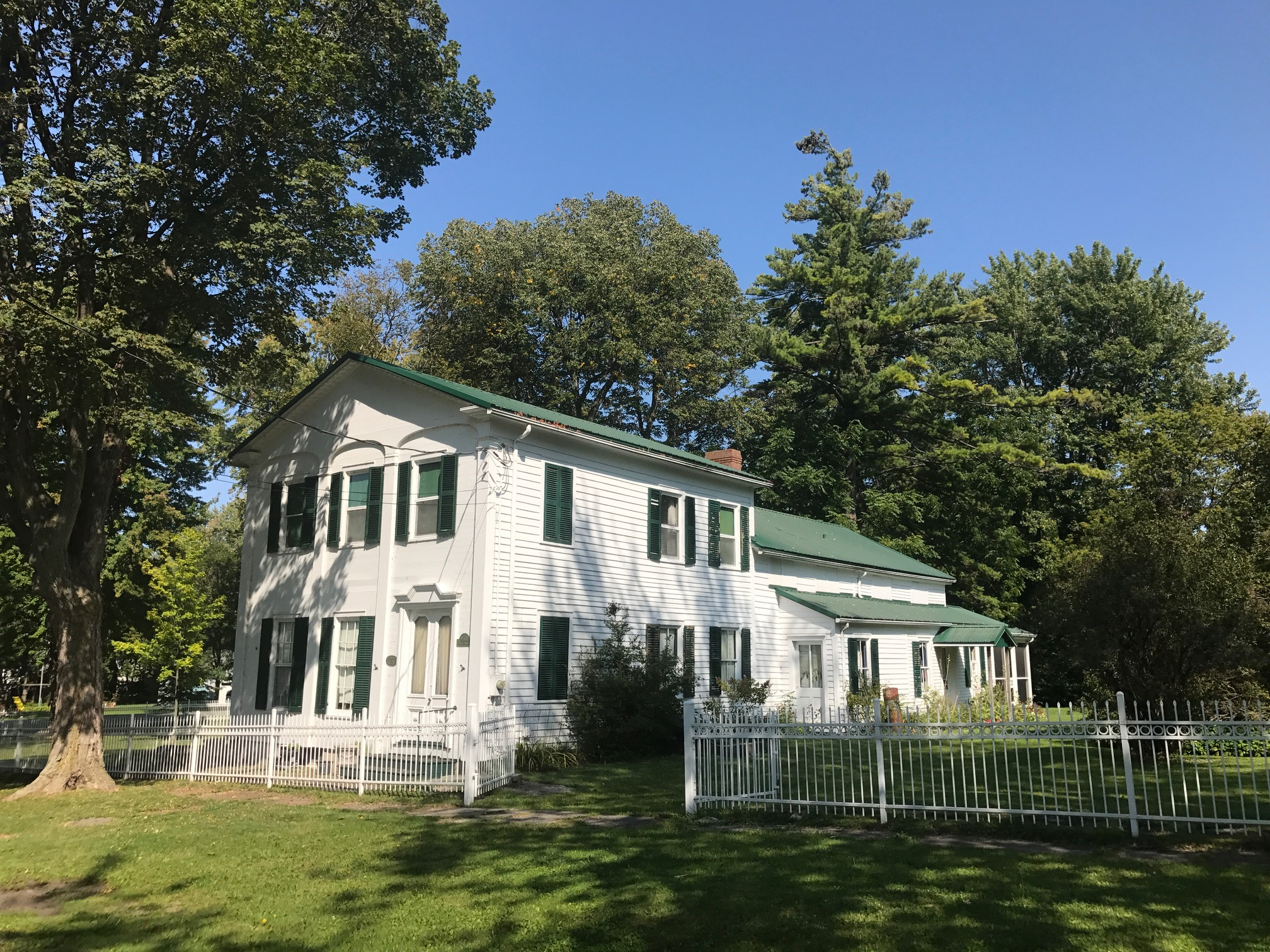
- Viewed from the south

- Location within New York Location within the United States
- Location: Point St., Cape Vincent, New York
- Coordinates: 44°7′36″N 76°20′6″W
- Area: 1 acre (0.40 ha)
- Built: 1820
- Architect: Starkey, Otis
- Architectural style: Federal
- MPS: Cape Vincent Town and Village MRA
- NRHP reference No.: 85002478
- Added to NRHP: September 27, 1985

Otis Starkey House is a historic home located at Cape Vincent in Jefferson County, New York. It was built about 1820 and is a two-story Federal style residence. It has two sections: a two-story main section and a lower two-story rear wing. Also on the property is a gabled carriage house.

It was listed on the National Register of Historic Places in 1985.
