= Xavier Chevalier House =

Historic house in New York, United States

- U.S. National Register of Historic Places
- Location within New York Location within the United States
- Location: Gosier Rd., Cape Vincent, New York
- Coordinates: 44°9′29″N 76°14′27″W
- Area: 53.2 acres (21.5 ha)
- Built: 1852
- Architect: Xavier Chevalier
- MPS: Cape Vincent Town and Village MRA
- NRHP reference No.: 85002457
- Added to NRHP: September 27, 1985

The Xavier Chevalier House is a historic house located on Gosier Road in Cape Vincent, Jefferson County, New York.

== Description and history ==
The limestone farmhouse was built in 1852 by Xavier Chevalier, and consists of three sections: a front, gabled, three-bay wide 1 1/2-story main block; a gabled, one-story side wing; and a small cinder block lean-to. Also on the property is a mid-19th-century saltbox barn and a mid-19th-century limestone smokehouse.

It was listed on the National Register of Historic Places on September 27, 1985.
