= Duvillard Mill =

- U.S. National Register of Historic Places
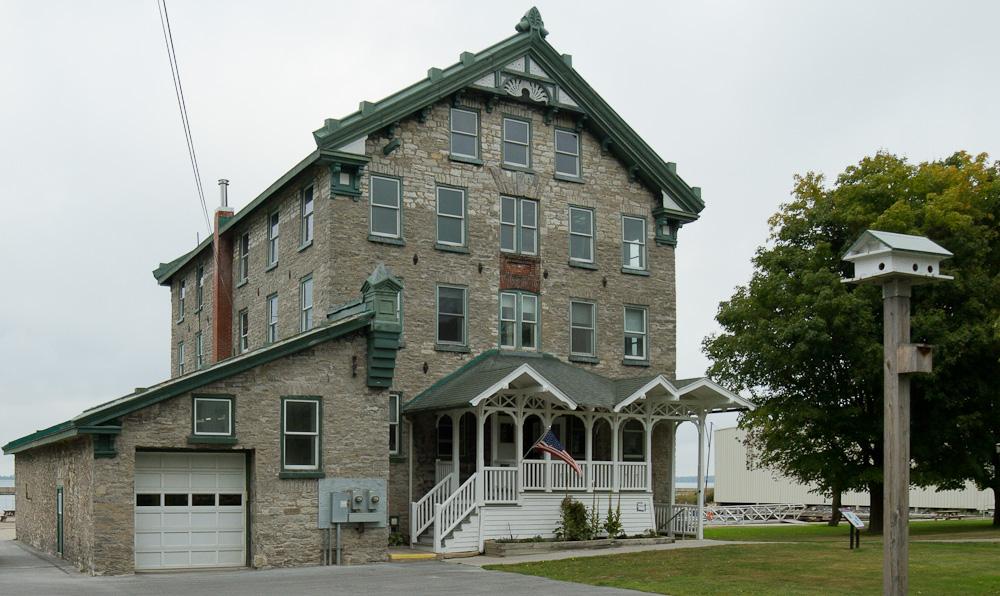

- Location within New York Location within the United States
- Location: Broadway, Cape Vincent, New York
- Coordinates: 44°7′49″N 76°19′54″W
- Area: less than one acre
- Built: 1856
- Architectural style: Stick/Eastlake
- MPS: Cape Vincent Town and Village MRA
- NRHP reference No.: 85002461
- Added to NRHP: September 27, 1985

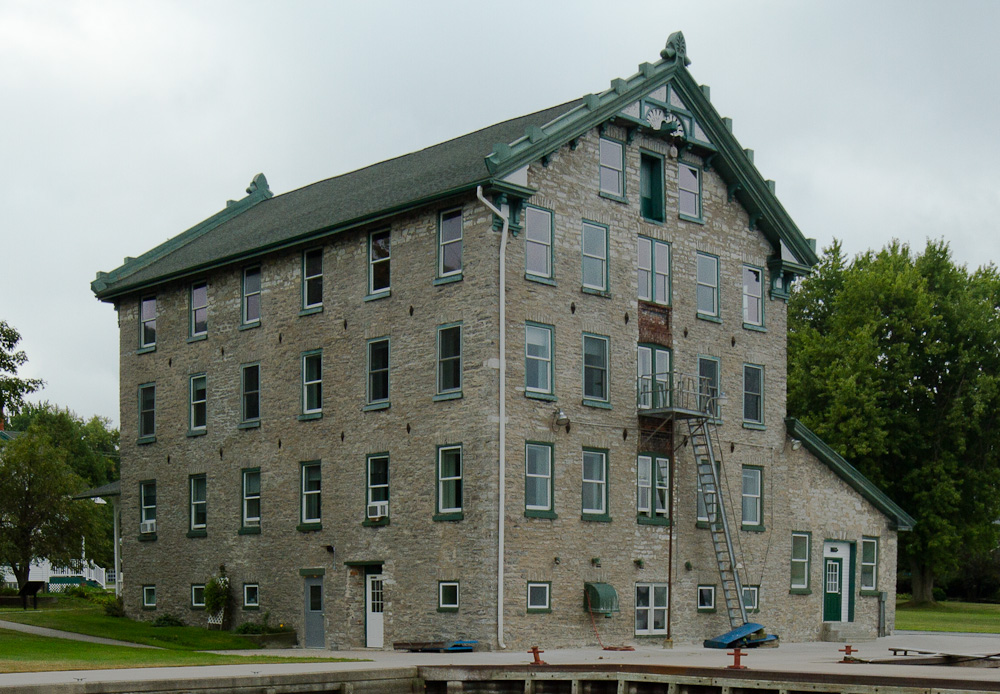
Duvillard Mill

Duvillard Mill is a historic grist mill located at Cape Vincent in Jefferson County, New York. It was built in 1856 and is a 4 1/2-story, limestone structure with Stick style decoration. Originally a grist mill, it was later a shingle and planing mill. It has been remodeled for use as an aquarium and museum.

It was listed on the National Register of Historic Places in 1985.
