= Pike Township, Bradford County, Pennsylvania =

Township in Pennsylvania, US

Coordinates: 41°51′02″N 76°10′17″W

- Township
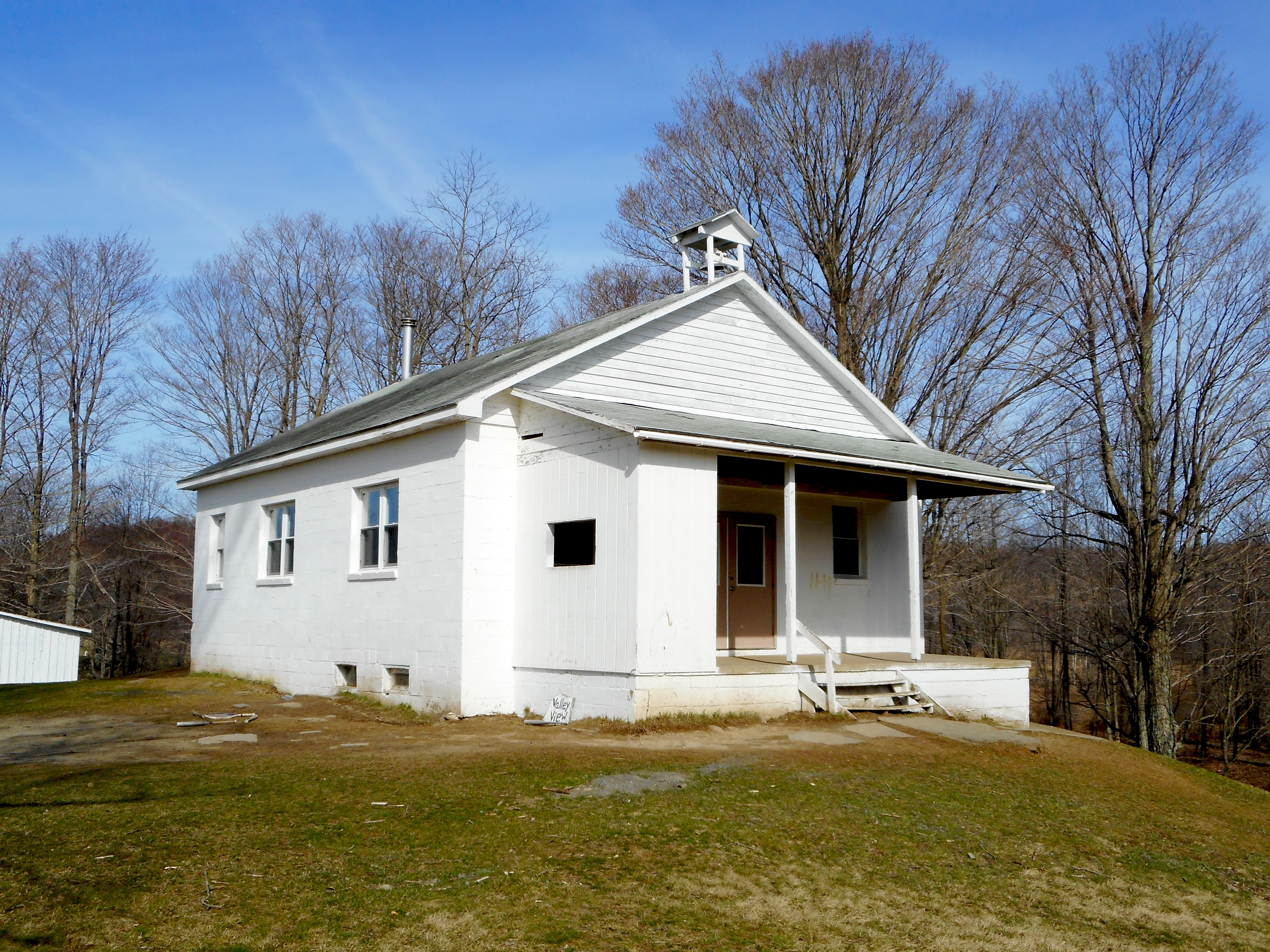
- Valley View Amish School

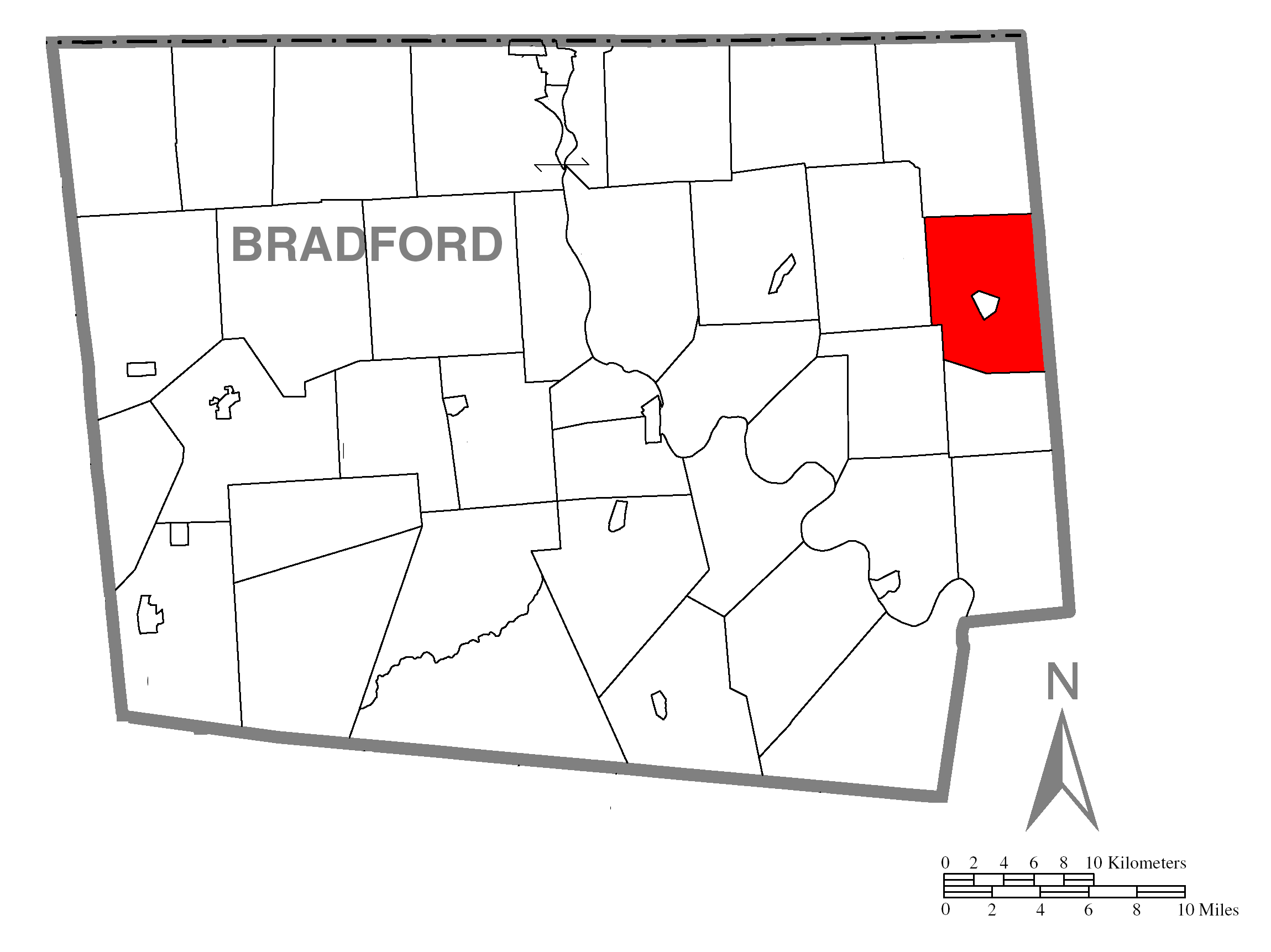
- Map of Bradford County with Pike Township highlighted

- Map of Bradford County, Pennsylvania
- Country: United States
- State: Pennsylvania
- County: Bradford
- Settled: 1790
- Incorporated: 1813

Area
  - Total: 27.67 sq mi (71.67 km^{2})
  - Land: 27.49 sq mi (71.20 km^{2})
  - Water: 0.18 sq mi (0.47 km^{2})

Population (2020)
  - Total: 630 ▼
  - Estimate (2023): 633
  - Density: 24.3/sq mi (9.37/km^{2})
- FIPS code: 42-015-60184

Pike Township is a township in Bradford County, Pennsylvania, United States. It is part of Northeastern Pennsylvania. The population was 630 at the 2020 census.

== Geography ==
Pike Township is located in eastern Bradford County and is bordered by Warren Township to the north, Orwell Township to the west, Herrick Township to the southwest, Stevens Township to the south. To the east is Susquehanna County, with Middletown Township (north) and Rush Township (south) along the border. The borough of Le Raysville is surrounded by Pike Township but separate from it. Pennsylvania Route 467 runs north–south through the township and Le Raysville.

According to the United States Census Bureau, the township has a total area of 27.7 square miles (71.7 km^{2}), of which 27.5 square miles (71.2 km^{2}) is land and 0.19 square miles (0.5 km^{2}), or 0.65%, is water.

== Demographics ==
Historical population
| Census | Pop. | Note | %± |
|---|---|---|---|
| 2010 | 671 | | — |
| 2020 | 630 | | −6.1% |
| 2023 (est.) | 633 | | 0.5% |
U.S. Decennial Census

As of the census of 2000, there were 657 people, 233 households, and 187 families residing in the township. The population density was 22.9 people per square mile (8.8/km^{2}). There were 305 housing units at an average density of 10.6/sq mi (4.1/km^{2}). The racial makeup of the township was 98.02% White, 0.91% African American, 0.76% from other races, and 0.30% from two or more races. Hispanic or Latino of any race were 1.83% of the population.

There were 233 households, out of which 37.3% had children under the age of 18 living with them, 69.1% were married couples living together, 4.7% had a female householder with no husband present, and 19.7% were non-families. 18.0% of all households were made up of individuals, and 6.9% had someone living alone who was 65 years of age or older. The average household size was 2.82 and the average family size was 3.16.

In the township the population was spread out, with 28.3% under the age of 18, 9.4% from 18 to 24, 25.9% from 25 to 44, 23.1% from 45 to 64, and 13.2% who were 65 years of age or older. The median age was 35 years. For every 100 females, there were 107.9 males. For every 100 females age 18 and over, there were 104.8 males.

The median income for a household in the township was $44,583, and the median income for a family was $49,063. Males had a median income of $32,115 versus $27,917 for females. The per capita income for the township was $17,539. About 7.4% of families and 11.7% of the population were below the poverty line, including 17.4% of those under age 18 and 3.1% of those age 65 or over.
