= St. John's Episcopal Church (Cape Vincent, New York) =

Historic church in New York, United States

- U.S. National Register of Historic Places
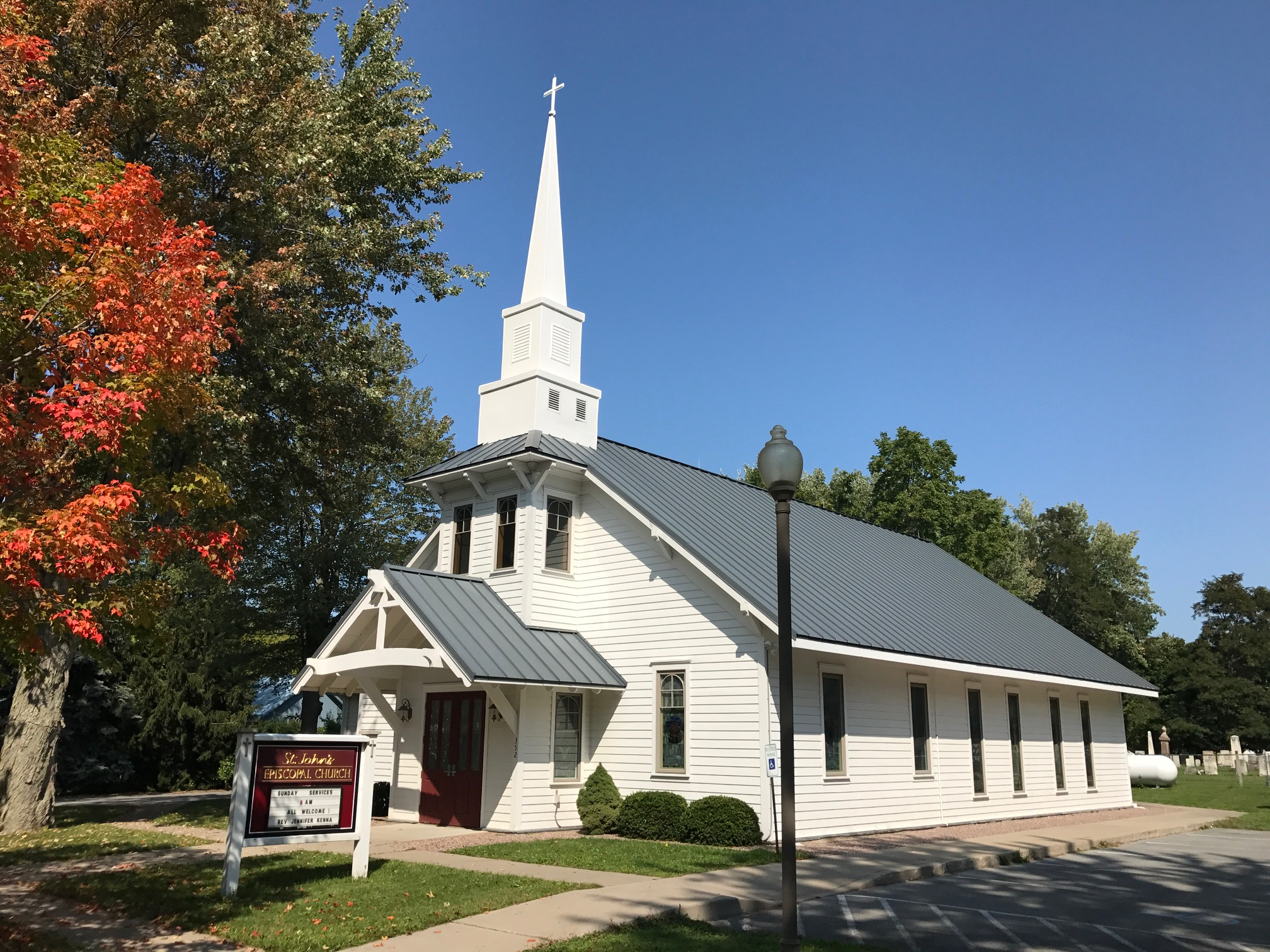

- Location within New York Location within the United States
- Location: 352 S. Market St., Cape Vincent, New York
- Coordinates: 44°7′30″N 76°20′8″W
- Area: less than one acre
- Built: 1841
- Architectural style: Federal
- MPS: Cape Vincent Town and Village MRA
- NRHP reference No.: 85002476
- Added to NRHP: September 27, 1985

St. John's Episcopal Church is a historic Episcopal church located at Cape Vincent in Jefferson County, New York. It was built in 1841 and consists of a one-story main block and a lower side wing in the Federal style. A three-story entry tower projects from the central bay of the front facade. The tower features an eight sided spire. Also on the property is the parish cemetery with the earliest gravestones dating to 1852.

It was listed on the National Register of Historic Places in 1985.

Fire destroyed the original church in 1999. The new church was rebuilt in 2001.
