= Claude Vautrin House =

Historic house in New York, United States

- U.S. National Register of Historic Places
- Location within New York Location within the United States
- Location: Mason Rd., Cape Vincent, New York
- Coordinates: 44°8′39″N 76°13′43″W
- Area: 263.5 acres (106.6 ha)
- Built: 1855
- Architect: Vautrin, Claude
- Architectural style: Italianate
- MPS: Cape Vincent Town and Village MRA
- NRHP reference No.: 85002480
- Added to NRHP: September 27, 1985

Claude Vautrin House is a historic home and farm complex located at Cape Vincent in Jefferson County, New York. The limestone farmhouse is a two-story structure with a square main block with a hipped roof and a one-story wooden rear wing with a gable roof, built in 1855 in the Italianate style. Also on the property are six contributing 19th century outbuildings: a barn with a silo, four sheds, and a smokehouse.

It was listed on the National Register of Historic Places in 1985.
