= Lewis House (Cape Vincent, New York) =

Historic house in New York, United States

- U.S. National Register of Historic Places
- Location within New York Location within the United States
- Location: Market St., Cape Vincent, New York
- Coordinates: 44°7′45″N 76°20′18″W
- Area: less than one acre
- Built: 1875
- Architectural style: Second Empire, Queen Anne
- MPS: Cape Vincent Town and Village MRA
- NRHP reference No.: 85002467
- Added to NRHP: September 27, 1985

Lewis House is a historic home located at Cape Vincent in Jefferson County, New York. It was built about 1875 and is a modest, eclectic 1 1/2-story frame house with an attached 3 1/2-story tower and a 1-story side wing with a shed roof. The tower is in the Second Empire style with a distinctive mansard roof.

It was listed on the National Register of Historic Places in 1985.
