= Jean Philippe Galband du Fort House =

Historic house in New York, United States

- U.S. National Register of Historic Places
- Location within New York Location within the United States
- Location: James St., Cape Vincent, New York
- Coordinates: 44°7′34″N 76°20′1″W
- Area: less than one acre
- Built: 1818
- Architectural style: Greek Revival, Gothic Revival, Vernacular Greek Revival
- MPS: Cape Vincent Town and Village MRA
- NRHP reference No.: 85002463
- Added to NRHP: September 27, 1985

The Jean Philippe Galband du Fort House is a historic house located on James Street in Cape Vincent, Jefferson County, New York.

== Description and history ==
Built in 1818, it is a 1 1/2-story, frame vernacular residence with Greek Revival detailing. It consists of two rectangular gabled blocks joined with a hyphen and a 1-story side wing on the north side. The south block contains a drawing room with a coffered ceiling inset with 24 original oil-on-canvas paintings, including those of George Washington and the Marquis de Lafayette. The drawing room also contains the original wallpaper, chandelier, fireplace, and mirror.

It was listed on the National Register of Historic Places on September 27, 1985.
