= Rogers Brothers Farmstead =

Historic house in New York, United States

- U.S. National Register of Historic Places
- Location within New York Location within the United States
- Location: Dablon Point Rd., Cape Vincent, New York
- Coordinates: 44°4′52″N 76°20′59″W
- Area: 48.6 acres (19.7 ha)
- Built: 1838
- Architect: Rogers, Austin
- Architectural style: Mid 19th Century Revival
- MPS: Cape Vincent Town and Village MRA
- NRHP reference No.: 98000392
- Added to NRHP: May 11, 1998

Rogers Brothers Farmstead, also known as Cottonwood Farm and Austin Rogers House, is a historic home located at Cape Vincent in Jefferson County, New York. It was built in 1838 and is a 1 1/2-story, five-by-two-bay, vernacular limestone farmhouse. A 1-story frame wing was added shortly after it was built.

It was listed on the National Register of Historic Places in 1998.
