= George Reynolds House =

Historic house in New York, United States

- U.S. National Register of Historic Places
- Location within New York Location within the United States
- Location: River Rd., Cape Vincent, New York
- Coordinates: 44°9′50″N 76°15′38″W
- Area: 1.4 acres (0.57 ha)
- Architect: Reynolds, George
- Architectural style: Colonial Revival, Greek Revival
- MPS: Cape Vincent Town and Village MRA
- NRHP reference No.: 85002470
- Added to NRHP: September 27, 1985

George Reynolds House is a historic home located at Cape Vincent in Jefferson County, New York. The limestone house is a 1 1/2-story, five-bay structure with a gable roof. Modifications undertaken in the 1920s introduced Colonial Revival details. Also on the property is a three-bay frame carriage house.

It was listed on the National Register of Historic Places in 1985.
