= Glen Building =

Historic commercial building in New York, United States

- U.S. National Register of Historic Places
- Location within New York Location within the United States
- Location: Broadway, Cape Vincent, New York
- Coordinates: 44°7′42″N 76°20′3″W
- Area: less than one acre
- Built: 1887
- Architectural style: Italianate
- MPS: Cape Vincent Town and Village MRA
- NRHP reference No.: 85002465
- Added to NRHP: September 27, 1985

The Glen Building is a historic commercial building located at Cape Vincent in Jefferson County, New York.

== Description and history ==
It is a two-story, L-shaped, wood-frame building with a low-pitched shed roof and Italianate detailing. It was built in 1887 as a combination family home and business. A small detached paint shop is also on the property.

It was listed on the National Register of Historic Places on September 27, 1985.
