= Union Meeting House (Cape Vincent, New York) =

Historic church in New York, United States

- U.S. National Register of Historic Places
- Location within New York Location within the United States
- Location: Millens Bay Rd., Cape Vincent (town), New York
- Coordinates: 44°10′19″N 76°14′32″W
- Area: less than one acre
- Built: 1869–1871; 155 years ago
- MPS: Cape Vincent Town and Village MRA
- NRHP reference No.: 85002479
- Added to NRHP: September 27, 1985

Union Meeting House, also known as the Millens Bay Union Church, is a historic church located at Millens Bay in the Town of Cape Vincent in Jefferson County, New York. It was built between 1869 and 1871 as a cooperative Episcopal and Methodist union church, as a mission of St. John's Episcopal Church in the village of Cape Vincent and of the Methodist-Episcopal Church in St. Lawrence. It is a one-story wood-frame structure, rectangular in plan, one bay wide and four bays long. It features a steeply pitched gable roof and steeple with a six sided spire. It can seat about 200 individuals. Interdenominational services are held on Sunday mornings in July and August each summer.

It was listed on the National Register of Historic Places in 1985.
