= Warren Wilson House =

Historic house in New York, United States

- U.S. National Register of Historic Places
- Location within New York Location within the United States
- Location: Favret Rd., Cape Vincent, New York
- Coordinates: 44°7′49″N 76°16′27″W
- Area: 185.7 acres (75.2 ha)
- Built: 1837
- Architect: Wilson, Warren
- MPS: Cape Vincent Town and Village MRA
- NRHP reference No.: 85002482
- Added to NRHP: September 27, 1985

The Warren Wilson House is a historic home and farm complex located at Cape Vincent in Jefferson County, New York. The limestone farmhouse is a 1 1/2-story structure with a three-bay, gabled main block and a 1-story gabled side-frame wing built about 1837. Also on the property are a barn and three sheds.

It was listed on the National Register of Historic Places in 1985.
