= First Presbyterian Society of Cape Vincent =

Historic church in New York, United States

- U.S. National Register of Historic Places
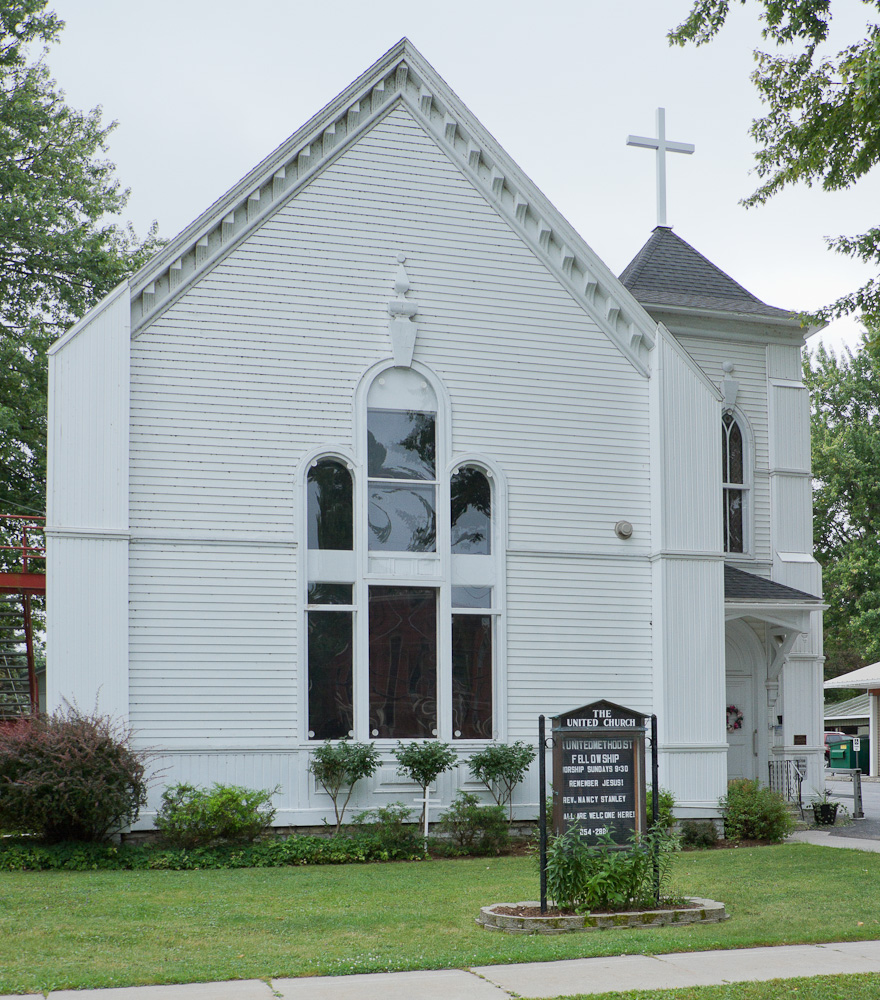

- Location within New York Location within the United States
- Location: 260 E. Broadway; Cape Vincent, New York
- Coordinates: 44°07′36″N 76°20′23″W
- Area: Less than 1 acre (0.40 ha)
- Built: c. 1832, 1882, 1892, 1914
- Architectural style: Federal, Gothic
- MPS: Cape Vincent Town and Village MRA
- NRHP reference No.: 12001258
- Added to NRHP: February 5, 2013

First Presbyterian Society of Cape Vincent, also known as the United Church of Cape Vincent, is a historic Presbyterian church located at Cape Vincent, Jefferson County, New York. It consists of a main block (1832), wood-framed narthex and tower (1884), and meeting hall (1959). The main block is a 1 1/2-story, Federal style limestone structure. The 2 1/2-story narthex has Gothic Revival style design elements. The main block was extensively rehabilitated in 1882, 1892, and 1914.

It was added to the National Register of Historic Places in 2013.
