= Aubertine Building =

Historic commercial building in New York, United States

- U.S. National Register of Historic Places
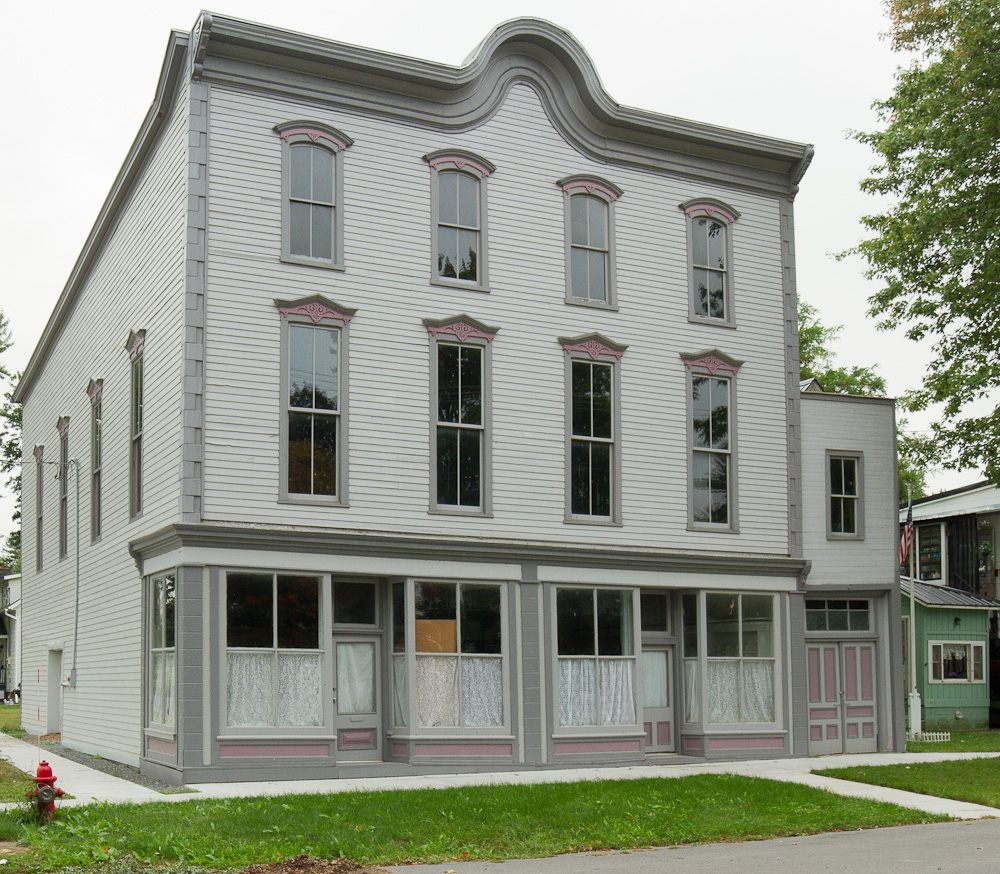
- Aubertine Building, 2018

- Location within New York Location within the United States
- Location: Broadway, Cape Vincent, New York
- Coordinates: 44°7′45″N 76°19′55″W
- Area: less than one acre
- Built: 1885
- Architectural style: Italianate
- MPS: Cape Vincent Town and Village MRA
- NRHP reference No.: 85002452
- Added to NRHP: September 27, 1985

The Aubertine Building is a historic commercial building located at Cape Vincent in Jefferson County, New York.

== Description and history ==
It is a three-story, wood-framed structure constructed in 1885 in the Italianate style. It has a two-story ell attached to the west side.

It was listed on the National Register of Historic Places in 1985.
