= Joseph Docteur House =

Historic house in New York, United States

- U.S. National Register of Historic Places
- Location within New York Location within the United States
- Location: Rosiere Rd., Cape Vincent, New York
- Coordinates: 44°7′6″N 76°13′52″W
- Area: 126 acres (51 ha)
- Built: ca. 1847
- Architect: Docteur, Joseph
- MPS: Cape Vincent Town and Village MRA
- NRHP reference No.: 85002460
- Added to NRHP: September 27, 1985

Joseph Docteur House is a historic home and farm complex located at Cape Vincent in Jefferson County, New York. The limestone farmhouse was built about 1847 and has two sections: a 1 1/2-storey main block and a 1-storey wooden rear wing. Also on the property are a 19th-century barn and three sheds.

It was listed on the National Register of Historic Places in 1985.
