= Nicholas Cocaigne House =

Historic house in New York, United States

- U.S. National Register of Historic Places
- Location within New York Location within the United States
- Location: Favret Rd., Cape Vincent, New York
- Coordinates: 44°6′58″N 76°18′45″W
- Area: 102.4 acres (41.4 ha)
- Built: 1839
- Architect: Cocaigne, Nicholas
- Architectural style: Colonial Revival
- MPS: Cape Vincent Town and Village MRA
- NRHP reference No.: 85002458
- Added to NRHP: September 27, 1985

The Nicholas Cocaigne House is a historic house and farm complex located at Cape Vincent in Jefferson County, New York.

== Description and history ==
The limestone farmhouse was built in 1839 and has three sections: a 1 1/2-story, three-bay main block; a single-story rear wing; and a one-story gabled, wooden ell off the wing. Modifications of the house in the 1920s introduced Colonial Revival details. Also on the property is a mid-19th-century barn and three sheds.

It was listed on the National Register of Historic Places on September 27, 1985.
