= St. Vincent of Paul Catholic Church =

Historic church in New York State, United States

- U.S. National Register of Historic Places
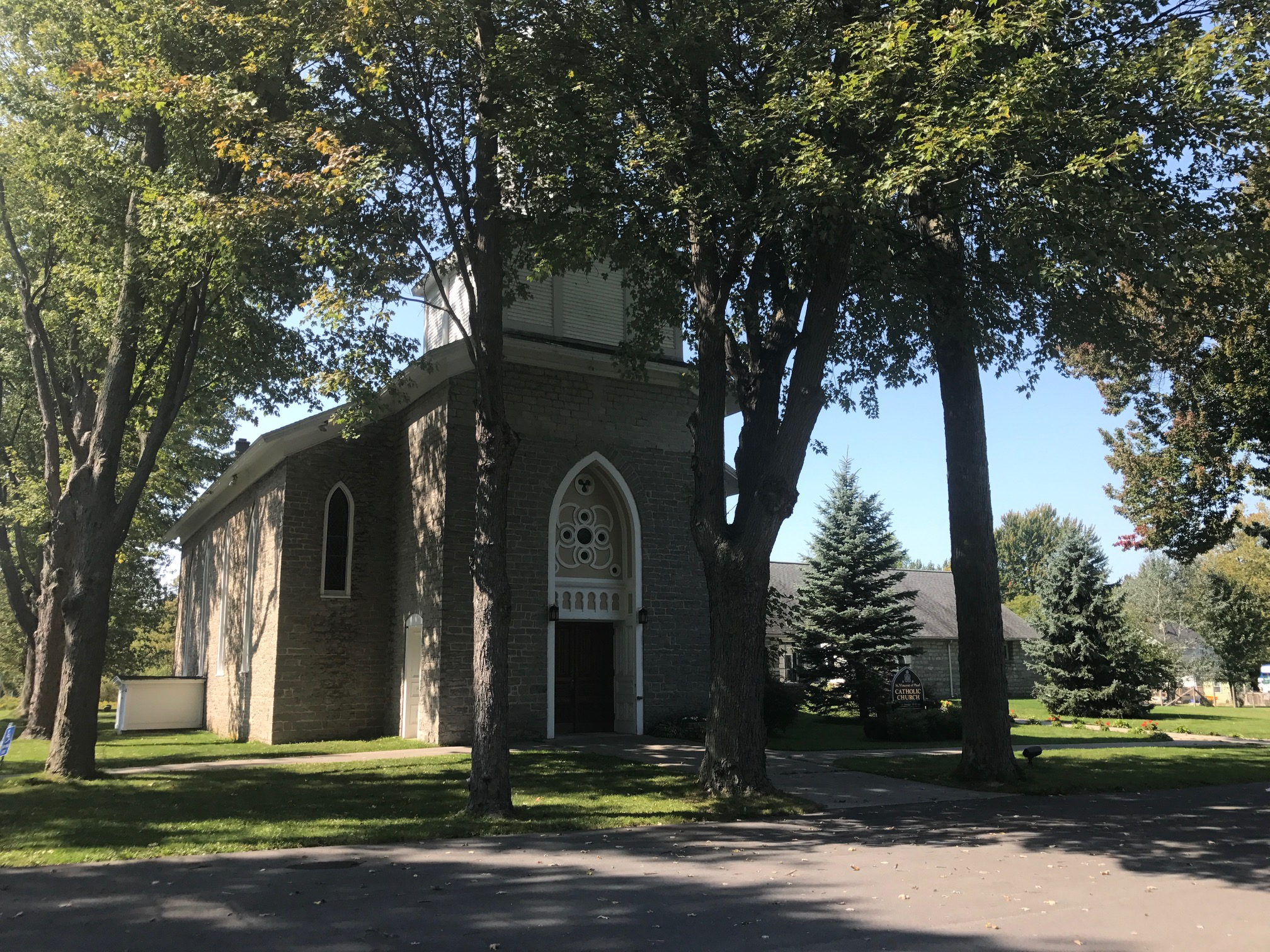

- Location within New York Location within the United States
- Location: Kanady St., Cape Vincent, New York
- Coordinates: 44°7′28″N 76°20′24″W
- Area: less than one acre (0.40 ha)
- Built: 1858; 168 years ago
- Architectural style: Gothic Revival
- MPS: Cape Vincent Town and Village MRA
- NRHP reference No.: 85002477
- Added to NRHP: September 27, 1985

St. Vincent of Paul Catholic Church is a historic Roman Catholic church located at Cape Vincent in Jefferson County, New York, under the authority of the Diocese of Ogdensburg.

== Description ==
Built in 1858, the church is a stone Gothic Revival-style structure consisting of two gabled limestone sections: a one-story rectangular main block and an attached modern side wing. It features a three-stage tower with a limestone base, a wood midsection, and a domed cupola topped by a round finial and simple cross.

It was listed on the National Register of Historic Places in 1985.
