= Roxy Hotel (Cape Vincent) =

- U.S. National Register of Historic Places
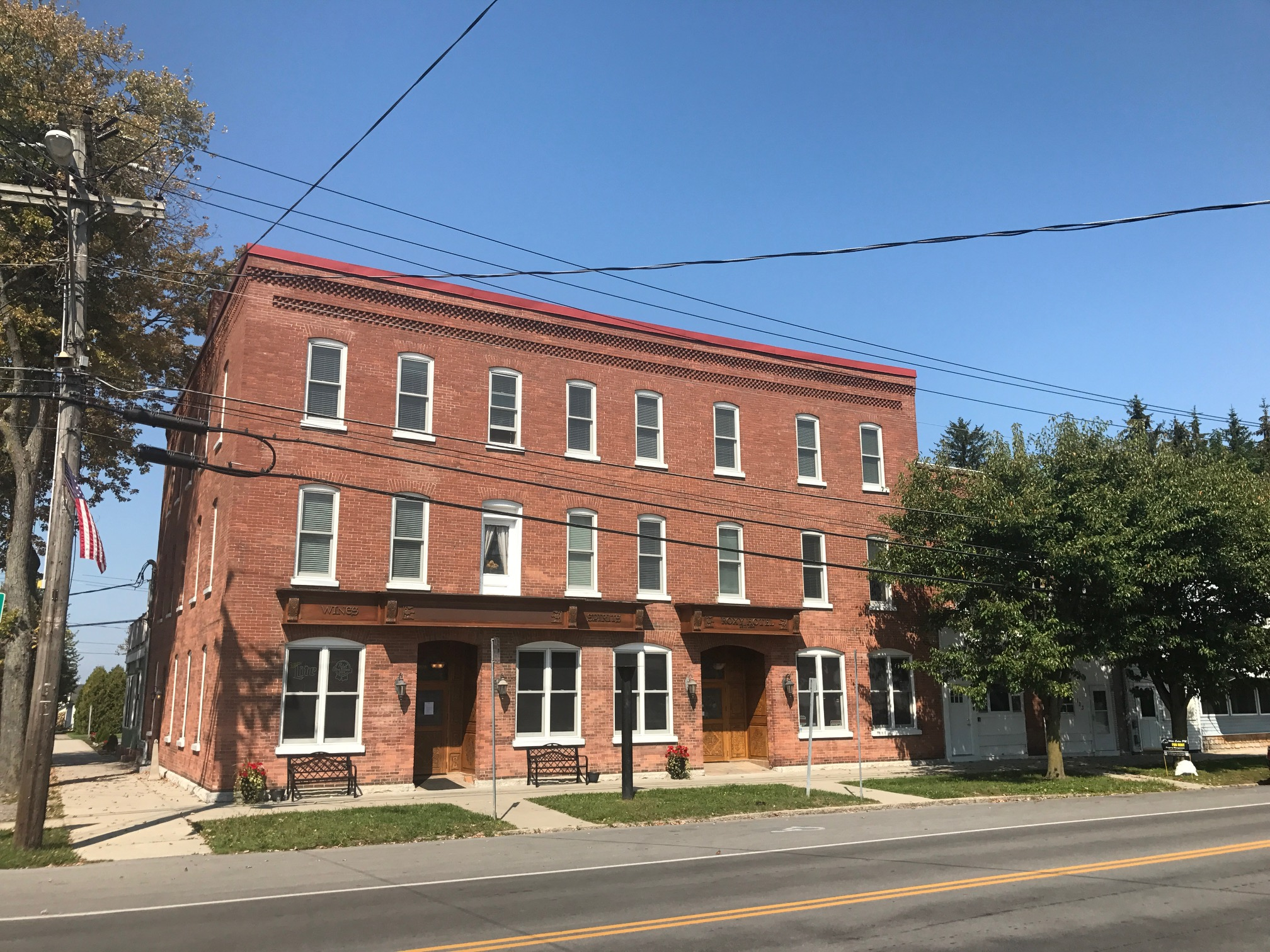

- Location within New York Location within the United States
- Location: 310 Broadway, Cape Vincent, New York
- Coordinates: 44°7′39″N 76°20′16″W
- Area: less than one acre
- Built: 1894
- MPS: Cape Vincent Town and Village MRA
- NRHP reference No.: 85002472
- Added to NRHP: September 27, 1985

Roxy Hotel is a historic hotel located at Cape Vincent in Jefferson County, New York. It is a red brick structure consisting of two sections: a three-story, eight bay main block and a two-story, four bay side wing. It was built in 1894, and has remained in continuous use as a hotel and center of the local tourist trade. The hotel was restored in 2011 by Michael Treanor, into 16 hotel rooms and an Irish Pub called Monaghan's Irish Pub.

It was listed on the National Register of Historic Places in 1985.
