= Johnson House (Cape Vincent, New York) =

Historic house in New York, United States

- U.S. National Register of Historic Places
- Location within New York Location within the United States
- Location: Tibbetts Point Rd., Cape Vincent, New York
- Coordinates: 44°6′22″N 76°21′17″W
- Area: 10 acres (4.0 ha)
- Built: 1840
- MPS: Cape Vincent Town and Village MRA
- NRHP reference No.: 85002466
- Added to NRHP: September 27, 1985

Johnson House is a historic home and farm complex located at Cape Vincent in Jefferson County, New York. The limestone farmhouse was built about 1840 and is a 1 1/2-story five-bay structure. Also on the property is a barn, a shed, and two corn cribs.

It was listed on the National Register of Historic Places in 1985.
