= E. K. Burnham House =

Historic house in New York, United States

- U.S. National Register of Historic Places
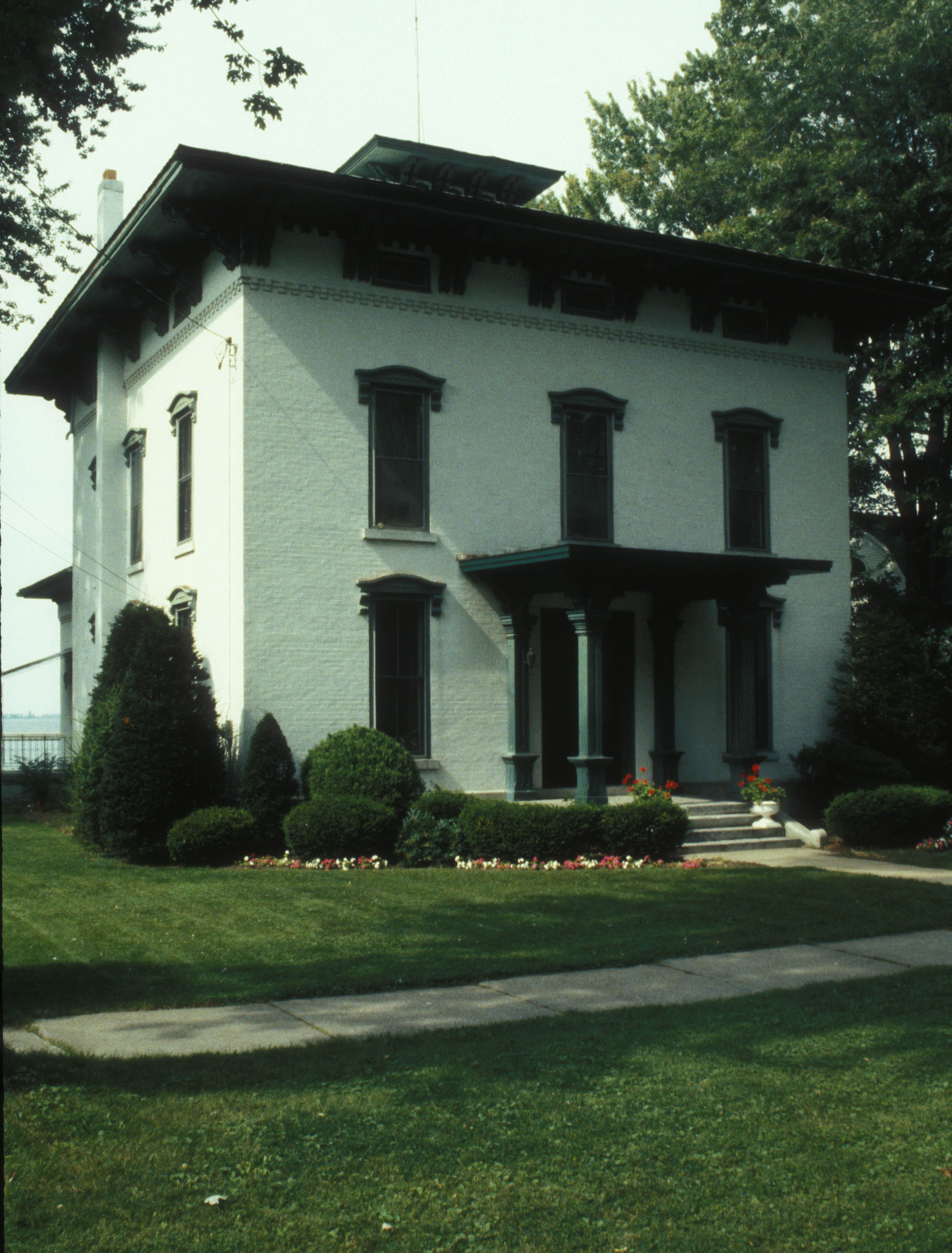

- Location within New York Location within the United States
- Location: 565 Broadway, Cape Vincent, New York
- Coordinates: 44°7′45″N 76°20′0″W
- Area: less than one acre
- Built: 1870
- Architectural style: Italianate
- MPS: Cape Vincent Town and Village MRA
- NRHP reference No.: 85002456
- Added to NRHP: September 27, 1985

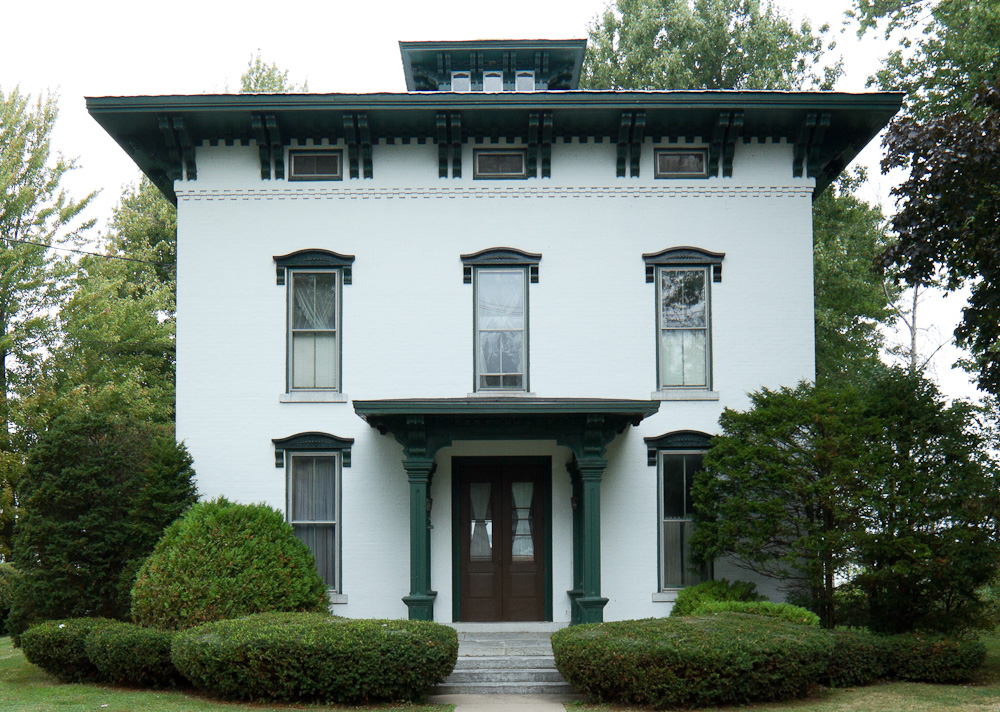
E. K. Burnham House 2018

The E. K. Burnham House is a historic house located in Cape Vincent, Jefferson County, New York.

== Description and history ==
It is an Italianate style brick residence built in 1870. It has a three-story, three-bay-wide main block with a central belvedere. Also on the property are a garage and two boathouses built in 1919.

It was listed on the National Register of Historic Places on September 27, 1985.
