= James Buckley House =

Historic house in New York, United States

- U.S. National Register of Historic Places
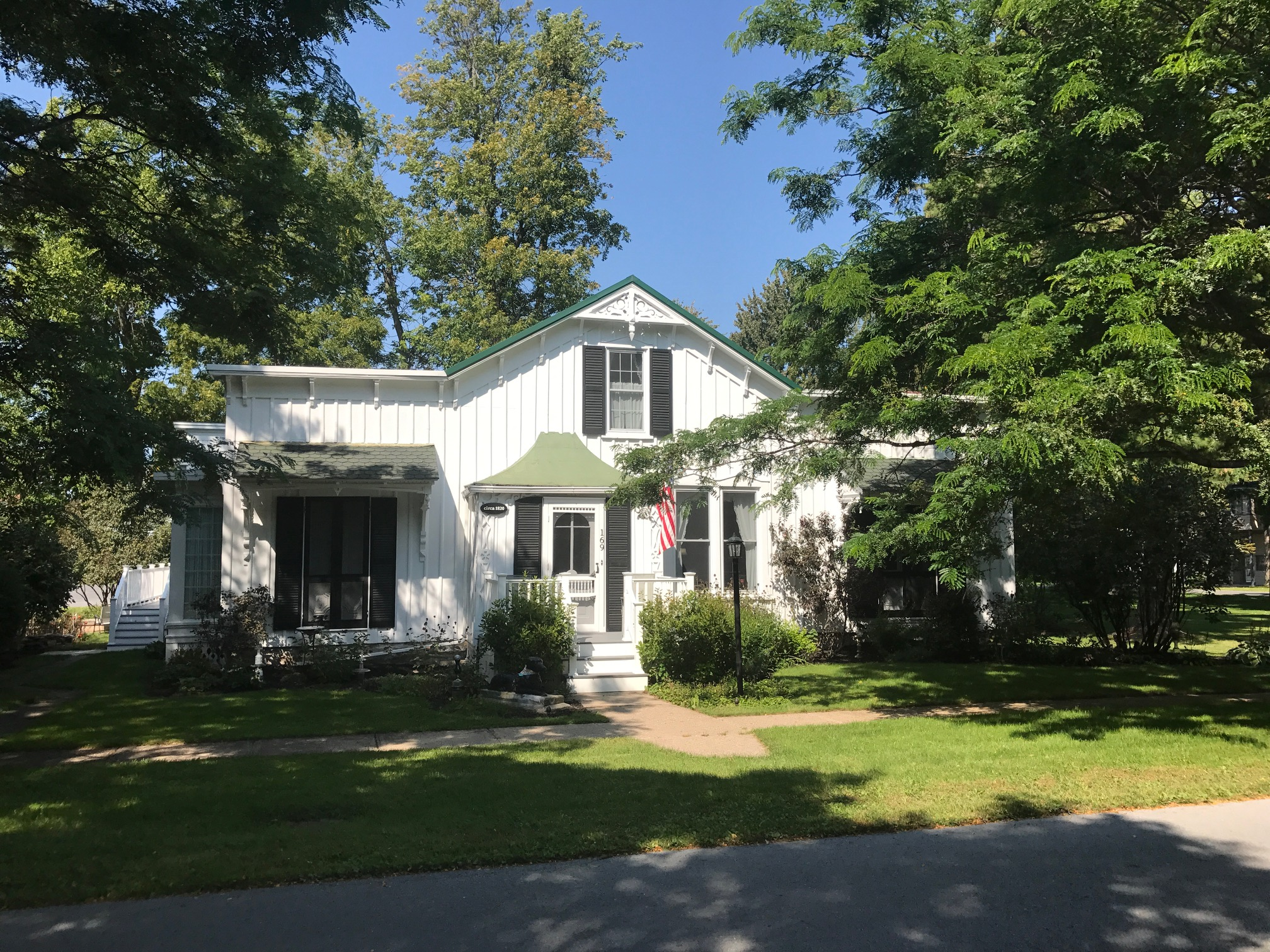

- Location within New York Location within the United States
- Location: Joseph St., Cape Vincent, New York
- Coordinates: 44°7′37″N 76°20′10″W
- Area: less than one acre
- Built: c. 1845
- Architectural style: Gothic, Gothic Cottage
- MPS: Cape Vincent Town and Village MRA
- NRHP reference No.: 85002454
- Added to NRHP: September 27, 1985

The James Buckley House is a historic house located on Joseph Street in Cape Vincent, Jefferson County, New York.

== Description and history ==
It is a 1 1/2-story frame structure built in about 1845 in the Gothic Cottage style. The central section is flanked by one-story wings with parapets hiding the shed roof.

It was listed on the National Register of Historic Places on September 27, 1985.
