= Captain Louis Peugnet House =

Historic house in New York, United States

- U.S. National Register of Historic Places
- Location within New York Location within the United States
- Location: Tibbetts Point Rd., Cape Vincent, New York
- Coordinates: 44°7′2″N 76°21′13″W
- Area: 2.1 acres (0.85 ha)
- Built: 1837
- MPS: Cape Vincent Town and Village MRA
- NRHP reference No.: 85002469
- Added to NRHP: September 27, 1985

Captain Louis Peugnet House is a historic home located at Cape Vincent in Jefferson County, New York. The limestone farmhouse was built about 1837 and is a 1 1/2-story five-bay structure with a central entry and a steeply pitched gable roof. It features an open porch with four square wooden columns that extends across the full width of the facade. Also on the property is a 19th-century barn.

It was listed on the National Register of Historic Places in 1985.
