= Reuter Dyer House =

Historic house in New York, United States

- U.S. National Register of Historic Places
- Location within New York Location within the United States
- Location: Rosiere Rd., Cape Vincent, New York
- Coordinates: 44°6′12″N 76°17′11″W
- Area: 94 acres (38 ha)
- Built: 1839
- Architectural style: Greek Revival
- MPS: Cape Vincent Town and Village MRA
- NRHP reference No.: 85002462
- Added to NRHP: September 27, 1985

Reuter Dyer House is a historic home and farm complex located at Cape Vincent in Jefferson County, New York. The limestone farmhouse was built about 1839 and has three sections: a 1 1/2-story, three-bay main block; a 1-story side wing; and a 1-story wooden ell projecting from the wing. Also on the property are two 19th-century barns.

It was listed on the National Register of Historic Places in 1985.
