= Shorthand education =

Shorthand education is education in shorthand or stenography. Stenography or shorthand has been taught in stenography schools (or shorthand schools) and other institutions, including public schools.

== History ==
809 schools in the United States reported the system of shorthand they taught in 1916 and 1918. The proportion teaching the Gregg system was 54.8% in 1916 and 64.4% in 1918. The proportion teaching any Pitman system was 44% in 1918.

== Methods ==
A number of methods and procedures exist for teaching shorthand:

- An analytical method was devised by Frick for Gregg shorthand. It has been described as "too difficult".

== Stenography schools ==
There were Graeco-Roman stenography schools. There were stenography schools in Boston in the 1870s and 1880s and in Japan before the War. In Paraguay, there were four stenography schools in 1947.

=== United Kingdom ===
- The Cusack Institute, London
- The Metropolitan School

=== Canada ===
- St Thomas Business College
- Central Business College
- Spencerian School of Shorthand, Montreal

=== Stenotype schools and institutes ===
These schools and institutes teach stenotypy, the use of a stenotype. As of 1962, stenotype schools were generally not large. As of 1959, most large cities in the United States had one. By 1915, they were meeting at a convention.

- Stenotype Institute of Jacksonville. This school, also called the Stenotype Institute, was an Acics accredited private stenography school with two campuses, one in Jacksonville, Florida, and one in Orlando, Florida. It was one of the 64 schools in North America certified by the NCRA. The school was founded in Jacksonville in 1940 by Thyra D Ellis. The Jacksonville school was closed in March 2016.
- Stenotype Institute of Sprinfield Closed in 1995.
- Stenotype Institute of South Dakota. Closed in 1996.
- Stenotype Institute of New York. Closed in 1986.
- Stenotype Institute of Washington. Created in 1935 and incorporated in 1938. Still existed circa 1973.

== Literature ==
There is a periodical called The American Shorthand Teacher. The periodical Dictation was "A Monthly Magazine Devoted to Shorthand Teachers".
