= Herrick Township, Bradford County, Pennsylvania =

Township in Pennsylvania, US

Coordinates: 41°46′00″N 76°15′59″W

- Township
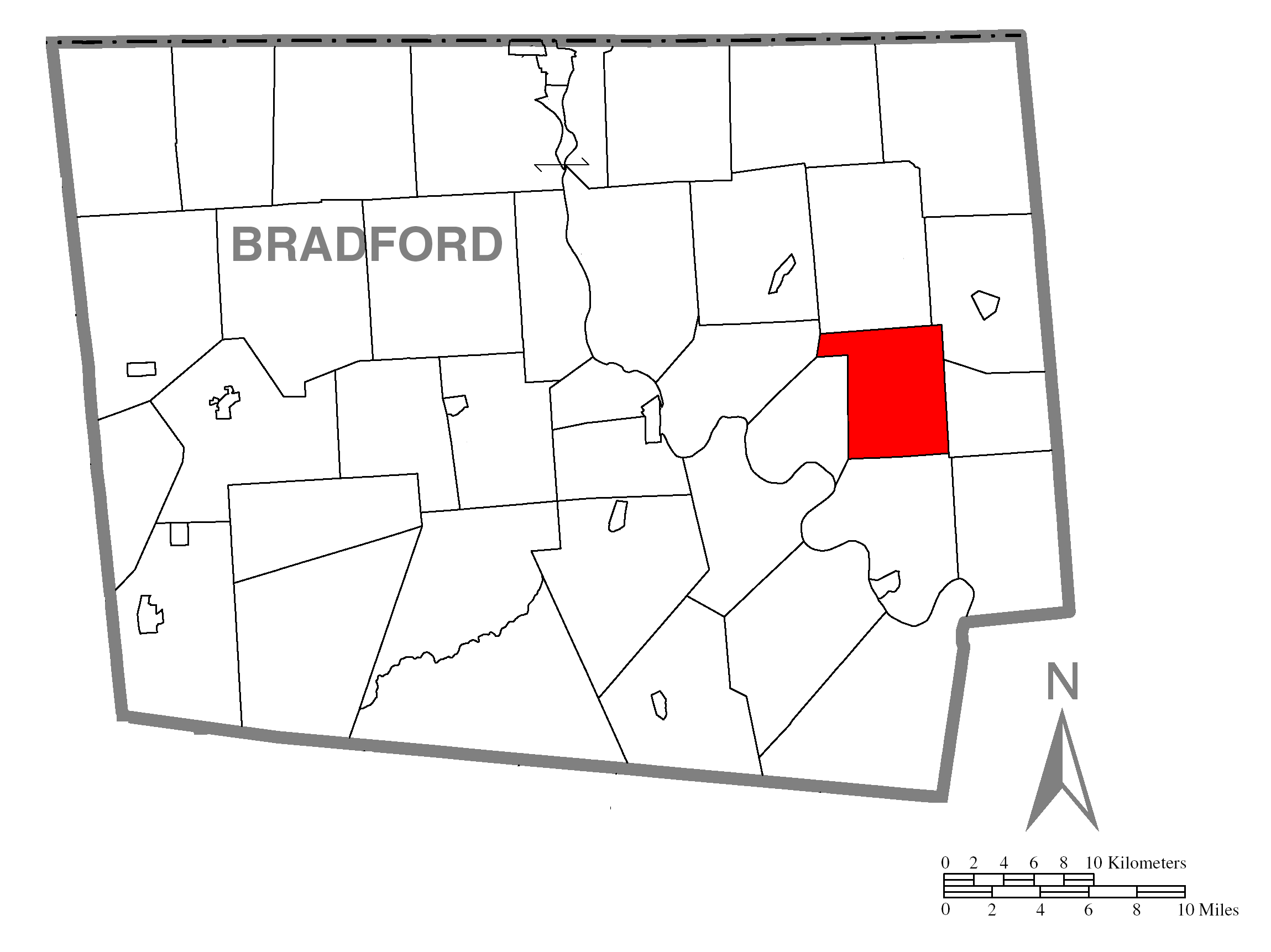
- Map of Bradford County with Herrick Township highlighted

- Map of Bradford County, Pennsylvania
- Country: United States
- State: Pennsylvania
- County: Bradford
- Settled: 1808
- Incorporated: 1838

Area
  - Total: 22.69 sq mi (58.77 km^{2})
  - Land: 22.48 sq mi (58.23 km^{2})
  - Water: 0.21 sq mi (0.55 km^{2})

Population (2020)
  - Total: 735 ▼
  - Estimate (2023): 732
  - Density: 33.5/sq mi (12.92/km^{2})
- FIPS code: 42-015-34088

Herrick Township is a township in Bradford County, Pennsylvania, United States. It is part of Northeastern Pennsylvania. The population was 735 at the 2020 census. For years it was known for a chair sitting on a fence post as you entered the town from the south on route 1017.

== Geography ==
Herrick Township is located in eastern Bradford County and is bordered by Orwell Township to the north, Pike and Stevens townships to the east, Wyalusing Township to the south, Standing Stone Township to the west and south and Wysox Township to the west. The unincorporated community of Herrickville is located in the northern part of the township.

According to the U.S. Cemnsus Bureau, the township has a total area of 22.7 square miles (58.8 km^{2}), of which 22.5 square miles (58.2 km^{2}) is land and 0.19 square miles (0.5 km^{2}), or 0.93%, is water.

== Demographics ==
Historical population
Census	Pop.	Note	%±
2010	754		—
2020	735		−2.5%
2023 (est.)	732		−0.4%
U.S. Decennial Census

As of the census of 2000, there were 676 people, 249 households, and 191 families residing in the township. The population density was 30.0 inhabitants per square mile (11.6/km^{2}). There were 309 housing units at an average density of 13.7/sq mi (5.3/km^{2}). The racial makeup of the township was 98.37% White, 0.15% African American, 0.59% Asian, 0.15% from other races, and 0.74% from two or more races. Hispanic or Latino of any race were 1.18% of the population.

There were 249 households, out of which 34.1% had children under the age of 18 living with them, 65.9% were married couples living together, 7.2% had a female householder with no husband present, and 22.9% were non-families. 18.5% of all households were made up of individuals, and 11.2% had someone living alone who was 65 years of age or older. The average household size was 2.71 and the average family size was 3.07.

In the township the population was spread out, with 26.0% under the age of 18, 7.2% from 18 to 24, 25.9% from 25 to 44, 26.6% from 45 to 64, and 14.2% who were 65 years of age or older. The median age was 39 years. For every 100 females, there were 91.0 males. For every 100 females age 18 and over, there were 90.1 males.

The median income for a household in the township was $30,208, and the median income for a family was $31,964. Males had a median income of $25,563 versus $23,393 for females. The per capita income for the township was $14,989. About 11.8% of families and 13.0% of the population were below the poverty line, including 14.4% of those under age 18 and 15.5% of those age 65 or over.
