= Le Raysville, Pennsylvania =

Borough in Pennsylvania, US

- Borough
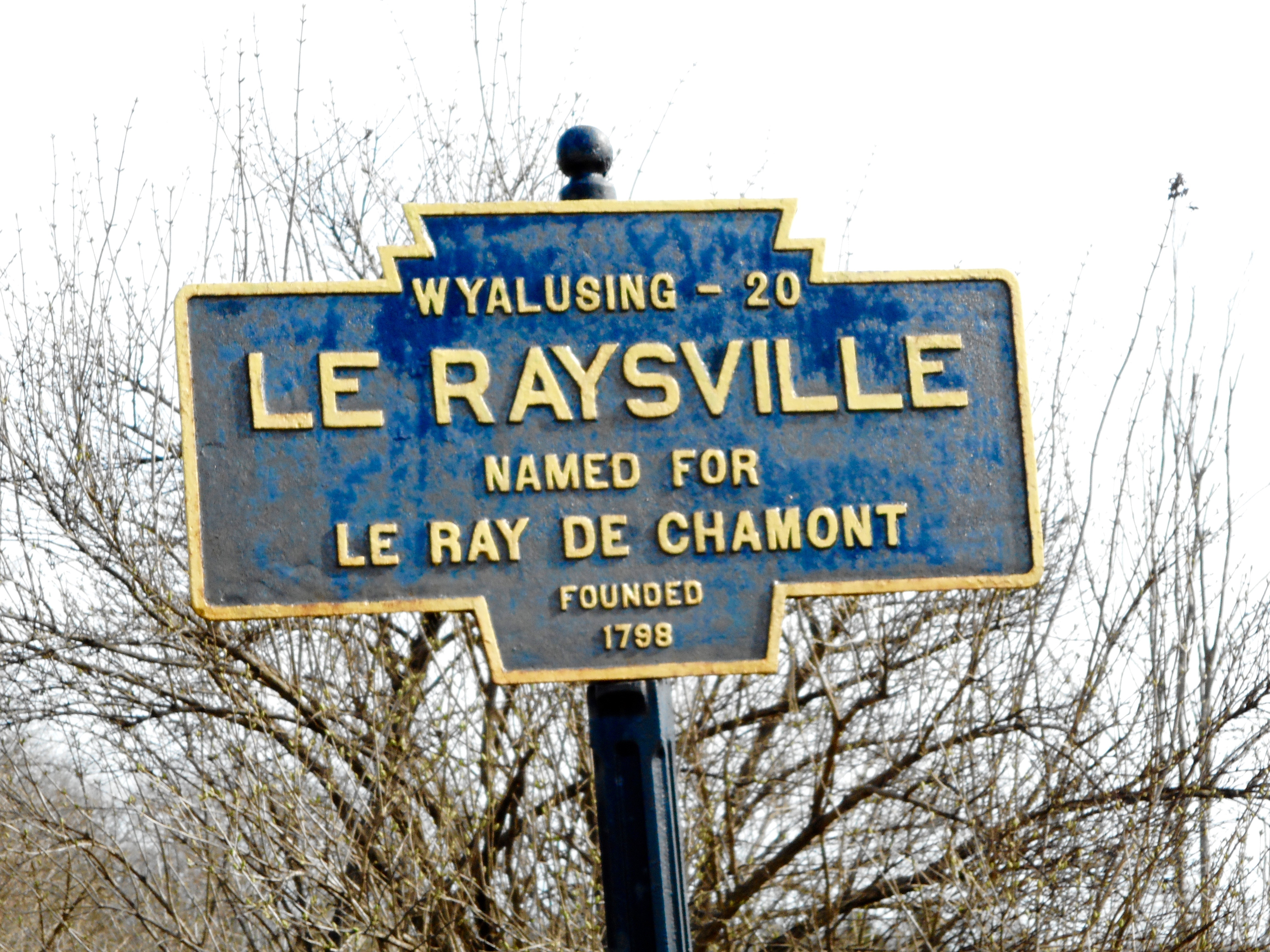
- Keystone Marker

- Location of Le Raysville in Bradford County, Pennsylvania.

- Location of Le Raysville in the state of Pennsylvania
- Coordinates: 41°50′16″N 76°10′49″W
- Country: United States
- State: Pennsylvania
- County: Bradford
- Settled: 1790
- Incorporated: 1863

Area
  - Total: 1.05 sq mi (2.71 km^{2})
  - Land: 1.04 sq mi (2.70 km^{2})
  - Water: 0.0039 sq mi (0.01 km^{2})
- Elevation: 1,572 ft (479 m)

Population (2020)
  - Total: 292
  - Density: 280.2/sq mi (108.18/km^{2})
- Time zone: UTC-5 (Eastern (EST))
  - Summer (DST): UTC-4 (EDT)
- Zip Code: 18829
- Area code: 570
- FIPS code: 42-42824

Le Raysville is a borough in Bradford County, Pennsylvania, United States. It is part of Northeastern Pennsylvania. The population was 290 at the 2020 census.

== History ==
A post office called Le Raysville was established in 1827. The borough was named for James Le Ray de Chaumont, a Frenchman-turned American citizen who purchased 80,000 acres in eastern Bradford County.

== Geography ==
Le Raysville is located in eastern Bradford County at 41°50′16″N 76°10′49″W (41.837698, -76.180393). It is surrounded by Pike Township but separate from it. According to the U.S. Census Bureau, the borough has a total area of 1.0 square mile (2.7 km^{2}), all land.

== Demographics ==
Historical population
Census	Pop.	Note	%±
1870	284		—
1880	324		14.1%
1890	374		15.4%
1900	375		0.3%
1910	326		−13.1%
1920	253		−22.4%
1930	298		17.8%
1940	344		15.4%
1950	310		−9.9%
1960	371		19.7%
1970	346		−6.7%
1980	356		2.9%
1990	336		−5.6%
2000	318		−5.4%
2010	290		−8.8%
2020	292		0.7%
2021 (est.)	290	▼	−0.7%

As of the census of 2000, there were 318 people, 111 households, and 86 families residing in the borough. The population density was 400.0 inhabitants per square mile (154.4/km^{2}). There were 120 housing units at an average density of 150.9 per square mile (58.3/km^{2}). The racial makeup of the borough was 99.06% White and 0.94% Native American.

There were 111 households, out of which 41.4% had children under the age of 18 living with them, 58.6% were married couples living together, 13.5% had a female householder with no husband present, and 22.5% were non-families. 18.9% of all households were made up of individuals, and 12.6% had someone living alone who was 65 years of age or older. The average household size was 2.86 and the average family size was 3.31.

In the borough the population was spread out, with 31.1% under the age of 18, 10.1% from 18 to 24, 27.7% from 25 to 44, 19.5% from 45 to 64, and 11.6% who were 65 years of age or older. The median age was 34 years. For every 100 females there were 89.3 males. For every 100 females age 18 and over, there were 88.8 males.

The median income for a household in the borough was $37,292, and the median income for a family was $43,750. Males had a median income of $32,500 versus $23,750 for females. The per capita income for the borough was $14,802. About 13.9% of families and 7.9% of the population were below the poverty line, including 4.6% of those under age 18 and 25.0% of those age 65 or over.

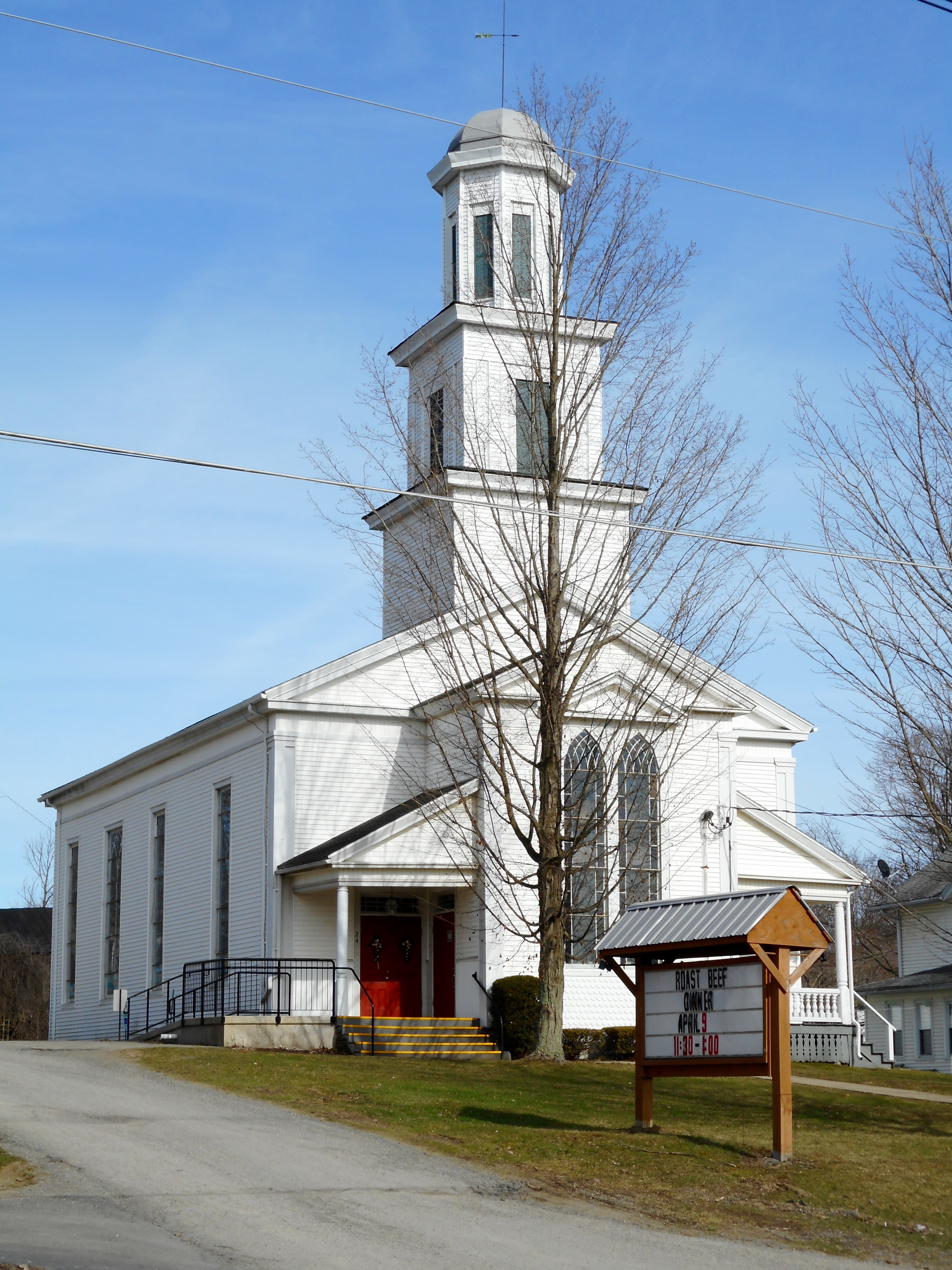
United Church of Christ

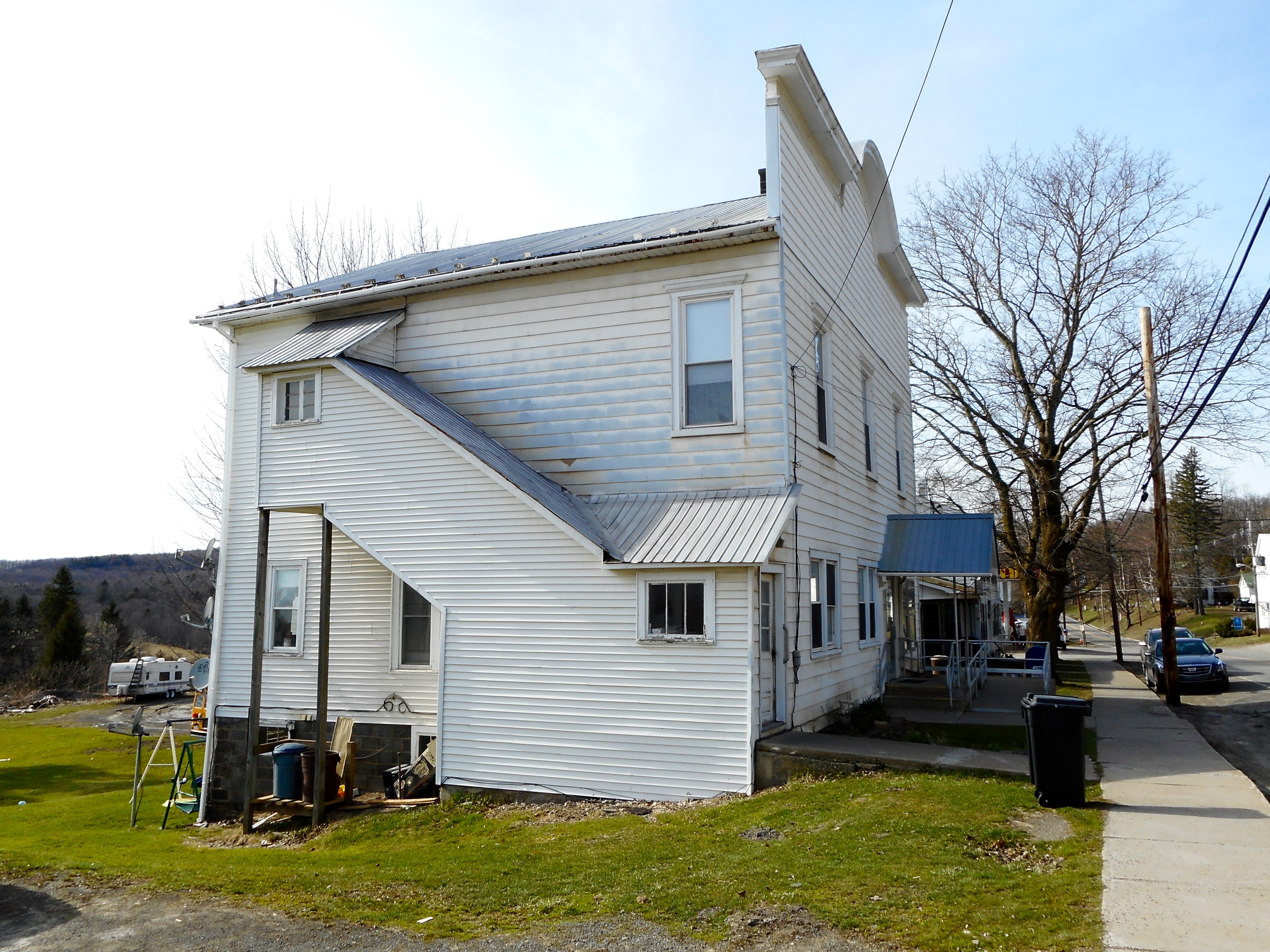
Post office

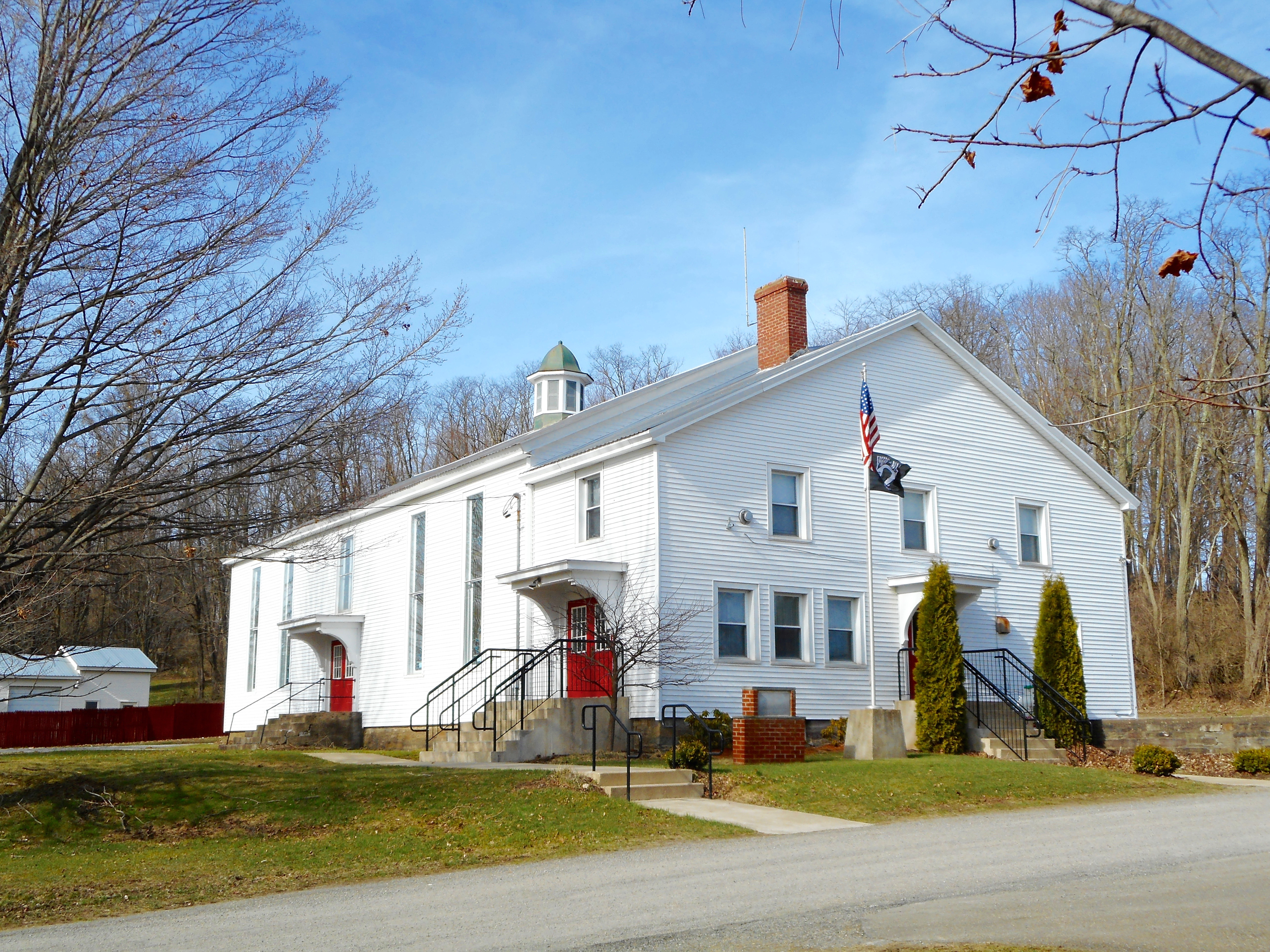
Former school

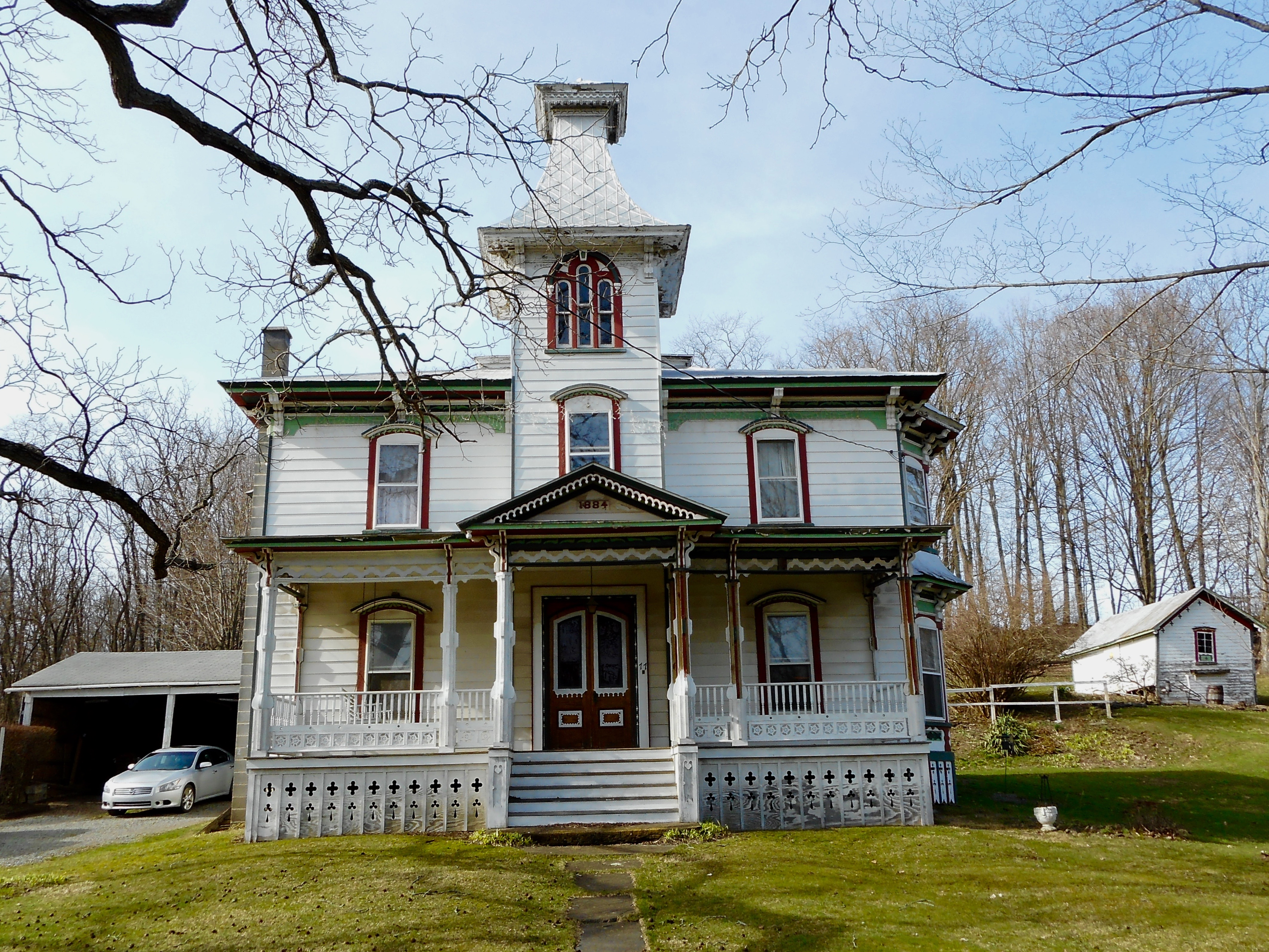
House

== Notable people ==
- Mary Alderson Chandler Atherton (1849–1934), American educator and textbook author
