= National Register of Historic Places listings in Jefferson County, New York =

Location of Jefferson County in New York

List of the National Register of Historic Places listings in Jefferson County, New York

This is intended to be a complete list of properties and districts listed on the National Register of Historic Places in Jefferson County, New York. The locations of National Register properties and districts (at least for all showing latitude and longitude coordinates below) may be seen in a map by clicking on "Map of all coordinates".

This National Park Service list is complete through NPS recent listings posted August 21, 2026.

Contents: Counties in New York
Albany (Albany) – Allegany – Bronx – Broome – Cattaraugus – Cayuga – Chautauqua – Chemung – Chenango – Clinton – Columbia – Cortland – Delaware – Dutchess (Poughkeepsie, Rhinebeck) – Erie (Buffalo) – Essex – Franklin – Fulton – Genesee – Greene – Hamilton – Herkimer – Jefferson – Kings – Lewis – Livingston – Madison – Monroe (Rochester) – Montgomery – Nassau – New York (Below 14th Street, 14th to 59th Streets, 59th to 110th Streets, Above 110th Street, Islands) – Niagara (Niagara Falls) – Oneida – Onondaga (Syracuse) – Ontario – Orange – Orleans – Oswego – Otsego – Putnam – Queens – Rensselaer – Richmond – Rockland – St. Lawrence – Saratoga – Schenectady – Schoharie – Schuyler – Seneca – Steuben – Suffolk – Sullivan – Tioga – Tompkins – Ulster – Warren – Washington – Wayne – Westchester (Northern, Southern, New Rochelle, Peekskill, Yonkers) – Wyoming – Yates

== Listings county-wide ==
	Name on the Register	Image	Date listed	Location	City or town	Description
1	Abingdon and New Abingdon Apartments		November 9, 2018 (#100003114)	327 Holcomb & 270-272 Mullin Sts. 43°58′18″N 75°55′09″W	Watertown	First purpose-built apartment buildings in city, dating to 1908–10
2	Adams Commercial Historic District	Adams Commercial Historic District	September 29, 2006 (#06000882)	Main and North Main Sts. and portions of East and West Church Sts. 43°48′32″N 76°01′28″W	Adams	
3	Levi Anthony Building		September 27, 1985 (#85002451)	Broadway; 44°07′47″N 76°19′47″W	Cape Vincent	part of the Cape Vincent Town and Village Multiple Resource Area (MRA)
4	William Archer House	William Archer House	November 19, 1980 (#80002623)	112 Washington St. 44°00′11″N 75°58′56″W	Brownville	part of the Stone Houses of Brownville Thematic Resource (TR)
5	Aubertine Building	Aubertine Building	September 27, 1985 (#85002452)	Broadway; 44°07′45″N 76°19′55″W	Cape Vincent	part of the Cape Vincent Town and Village MRA
6	Samuel F. Ballard House		October 19, 2022 (#100006515)	15811 Cty. Rd. 64; 43°53′49″N 75°58′29″W	Watertown	
7	Cyrus Bates House	Cyrus Bates House	July 14, 2004 (#04000710)	7185 NY 3; 43°49′28″N 76°12′08″W	Henderson	
8	Bedford Creek Bridge	Bedford Creek Bridge	October 18, 1989 (#89001617)	Campbell's Point Rd. over Bedford Creek; 43°54′32″N 76°07′12″W	Hounsfield	part of the Hounsfield MRA
9	Dr. Abner Benton House	Dr. Abner Benton House	August 23, 1984 (#84002405)	Main St. 44°17′20″N 75°37′36″W	Oxbow	
10	George C. Boldt Yacht House	George C. Boldt Yacht House	April 26, 1978 (#78001853)	Northwest of Alexandria Bay on Wellesley Island; 44°20′47″N 75°55′37″W	Alexandria Bay	G. W. & W. D. Hewitt, architects.
11	John Borland House	John Borland House	September 27, 1985 (#85002453)	Market St. 44°07′36″N 76°20′12″W	Cape Vincent	part of the Cape Vincent Town and Village MRA
12	Broadway Historic District		September 27, 1985 (#85002455)	St. Lawrence River, W. edge of Village of Cape Vincent, on Broadway & Tibbetts Point; 44°07′26″N 76°20′44″W	Cape Vincent	part of the Cape Vincent Town and Village MRA
13	Gen. Jacob Brown Mansion	Gen. Jacob Brown Mansion	November 19, 1980 (#80002624)	Brown Blvd. 44°00′19″N 75°59′00″W	Brownville	part of the Stone Houses of Brownville TR
14	Brownville Hotel		November 19, 1980 (#80002625)	Brown Blvd. and W. Main St. 44°00′10″N 75°59′02″W	Brownville	part of the Stone Houses of Brownville TR
15	James Buckley House	James Buckley House	September 27, 1985 (#85002454)	Joseph St. 44°07′37″N 76°20′10″W	Cape Vincent	part of the Cape Vincent Town and Village MRA
16	E. K. Burnham House	E. K. Burnham House	September 27, 1985 (#85002456)	565 Broadway; 44°07′45″N 76°20′00″W	Cape Vincent	part of the Cape Vincent Town and Village MRA
17	Buttermilk Flat Schoolhouse No. 22		June 28, 1996 (#96000671)	South side of Buttermilk Flat Rd., east of junction with Carter St. Rd., 44°10′23″N 75°56′57″W	Orleans	part of the Orleans Multiple Property Submission (MPS)
18	Elisha Camp House	Elisha Camp House	April 23, 1973 (#73001196)	310 General Smith Dr. 43°56′55″N 76°07′05″W	Sackets Harbor	
19	Carter Street Schoolhouse No. 21		June 28, 1996 (#96000665)	Junction of Vaadi and Dog Hill Rds., southwest corner 44°07′11″N 75°57′12″W	Orleans	part of the Orleans MPS
20	Cedar Grove Cemetery		September 6, 1990 (#90001324)	Washington St. 44°03′51″N 76°08′02″W	Chaumont	part of the Lyme MRA
21	Central Garage	Central Garage	October 18, 1996 (#96001172)	North side of Clayton St., west of junction with Main St., Hamlet of La Fargeville; 44°11′41″N 75°58′00″W	Orleans	part of the Orleans MPS
22	Chaumont Grange Hall and Dairymen's League Building		September 6, 1990 (#90001337)	Main St. 44°03′55″N 76°07′44″W	Chaumont	part of the Lyme MRA
23	Chaumont Historic District		September 6, 1990 (#90001336)	Along Main St., roughly between Washington and Church Sts. 44°04′04″N 76°08′00″W	Chaumont	part of the Lyme MRA
24	Chaumont House		September 6, 1990 (#90001341)	Main St. 44°04′08″N 76°08′19″W	Chaumont	part of the Lyme MRA
25	Chaumont Railroad Station		September 6, 1990 (#90001332)	Main St. 44°04′02″N 76°07′45″W	Chaumont	part of the Lyme MRA
26	Xavier Chevalier House		September 27, 1985 (#85002457)	Gosier Rd. 44°09′29″N 76°14′27″W	Cape Vincent	part of the Cape Vincent Town and Village MRA
27	Church of Saint Lawrence	Church of Saint Lawrence	May 16, 1997 (#97000442)	Fuller St., junction with Sisson St. 44°20′11″N 75°55′17″W	Alexandria Bay	part of the Historic Churches of the Episcopal Diocese of Central New York MPS
28	Clayton Historic District	Clayton Historic District	September 12, 1985 (#85002368)	203-215 & 200-326 James St., 500-544 & 507-537 Riverside Dr. • Boundary increase (listed May 9, 1997, refnum 97000424): 335, 403, 409, 413, 419, and 435 Riverside Dr. 44°14′31″N 76°05′22″W	Clayton	
29	Nicholas Cocaigne House		September 27, 1985 (#85002458)	Favret Rd. 44°06′58″N 76°18′45″W	Cape Vincent	part of the Cape Vincent Town and Village MRA
30	Conklin Farm	Conklin Farm	October 18, 1989 (#89001624)	Evans Rd. 43°59′02″N 75°59′29″W	Hounsfield	part of the Hounsfield MRA
31	Cornwall Brothers' Store	Cornwall Brothers' Store	May 2, 1975 (#75001191)	2 Howell Pl. 44°20′17″N 75°55′11″W	Alexandria Bay	
32	Densmore Methodist Church of the Thousand Islands		May 19, 1988 (#88000591)	Rt. 100 at Densmore Bay; 44°19′19″N 75°57′15″W	Alexandria	
33	Dexter Universalist Church	Dexter Universalist Church	September 19, 2003 (#03000249)	Brown and Kirby Sts. 44°00′29″N 76°02′41″W	Dexter	
34	Remy Dezengremel House		September 27, 1985 (#85002459)	Rosiere Rd. 44°06′21″N 76°15′39″W	Cape Vincent	part of the Cape Vincent Town and Village MRA
35	District School No. 19		October 18, 1989 (#89001618)	Co. Rd. 69; 43°55′29″N 76°01′53″W	Hounsfield	part of the Hounsfield MRA
36	District School No. 20		October 18, 1989 (#89001619)	NY 3, south of Co. Rd. 75; 43°55′34″N 76°06′32″W	Hounsfield	part of the Hounsfield MRA
37	District School No. 3		September 6, 1990 (#90001326)	Junction of NY 3 and County Rd. 57, Putnam Corners; 44°04′09″N 76°14′18″W	Lyme	part of the Lyme MRA
38	Joseph Docteur House		September 27, 1985 (#85002460)	Rosiere Rd. 44°07′06″N 76°13′52″W	Cape Vincent	part of the Cape Vincent Town and Village MRA
39	Duvillard Mill	Duvillard Mill	September 27, 1985 (#85002461)	Broadway; 44°07′49″N 76°19′54″W	Cape Vincent	part of the Cape Vincent Town and Village MRA
40	Reuter Dyer House		September 27, 1985 (#85002462)	Rosiere Rd. 44°06′12″N 76°17′11″W	Cape Vincent	part of the Cape Vincent Town and Village MRA
41	East Charity Shoal Light	East Charity Shoal Light	March 27, 2008 (#08000231)	Northeast Lake Ontario at US-Canada boundary 9.5 miles (15.3 km) southwest of Cape Vincent; 44°02′19″N 76°28′54″W	Cape Vincent	part of the Light Stations of the United States MPS
42	East Hounsfield Christian Church		October 18, 1989 (#89001621)	NY 3; 43°58′08″N 75°59′33″W	Hounsfield	part of the Hounsfield MRA
43	Emerson Place	Emerson Place	April 18, 2003 (#03000241)	20-30 Emerson Place; 43°58′24″N 75°53′59″W	Watertown	
44	Evans-Gaige-Dillenback House		September 6, 1990 (#90001340)	Evans Rd. 44°04′09″N 76°08′13″W	Lyme	part of the Lyme MRA
45	Fairview Manor	Fairview Manor	August 30, 2007 (#07000866)	38289 NY 12-E; 44°13′22″N 76°07′18″W	Clayton	
46	First Baptist Church and Cook Memorial Building	First Baptist Church and Cook Memorial Building	February 9, 2005 (#05000016)	511 State St. 43°58′55″N 75°36′29″W	Carthage	
47	First Presbyterian Society of Cape Vincent	First Presbyterian Society of Cape Vincent	February 5, 2013 (#12001258)	260 E. Broadway; 44°07′36″N 76°20′23″W	Cape Vincent	from Cape Vincent Town and Village MRA
48	First Universalist Church of Henderson		August 24, 2026 (#100013326)	12581 County Route 72; 43°50′56″N 76°10′56″W	Henderson	
49	Roswell P. Flower Memorial Library	Roswell P. Flower Memorial Library	January 10, 1980 (#80002628)	229 Washington St. 43°58′23″N 75°54′39″W	Watertown	
50	Charles Ford House		December 20, 1996 (#96001472)	West side of Ford St., south of junction with Co. Rd. 181, Hamlet of La Fargeville; 44°11′36″N 75°58′17″W	Orleans	part of the Orleans MPS
51	Fort Haldimand Site	Fort Haldimand Site	December 15, 1978 (#78001854)	Address Restricted	Cape Vincent	
52	Jean Philippe Galband du Fort House		September 27, 1985 (#85002463)	James St. 44°07′34″N 76°20′01″W	Cape Vincent	part of the Cape Vincent Town and Village MRA
53	Galloo Island Light	Galloo Island Light	August 4, 1983 (#83001682)	Galloo Island; 43°53′18″N 76°26′40″W	Sackets Harbor	part of the U.S. Coast Guard Lighthouses and Light Stations on the Great Lakes TR
54	George Brothers Building	George Brothers Building	September 6, 1990 (#90001334)	Mill St. 44°03′56″N 76°07′47″W	Chaumont	part of the Lyme MRA
55	George House		September 6, 1990 (#90001338)	Washington St. 44°03′57″N 76°08′05″W	Chaumont	part of the Lyme MRA
56	Getman Farmhouse		September 6, 1990 (#90001322)	S. Shore Rd. 43°58′31″N 76°16′25″W	Lyme	part of the Lyme MRA
57	Glen Building		September 27, 1985 (#85002465)	Broadway; 44°07′42″N 76°20′03″W	Cape Vincent	part of the Cape Vincent Town and Village MRA
58	Grenadier Island Schoolhouse	Grenadier Island Schoolhouse	November 21, 2012 (#12000955)	Grenadier Island Rd. 3; 44°02′53″N 76°21′15″W	Grenadier Island vicinity	
59	Grindstone Island Upper Schoolhouse		August 14, 2012 (#12000509)	41591 Cross Island Rd. 44°16′12″N 76°07′45″W	Clayton vicinity	
60	Dr. Samuel Guthrie House	Dr. Samuel Guthrie House	October 18, 1989 (#89001616)	Co. Rd. 75/Military Rd. 43°57′05″N 76°05′36″W	Hounsfield	part of the Hounsfield MRA
61	Holland Library	Holland Library	November 15, 2002 (#02001330)	7 Market St. 44°20′11″N 75°55′06″W	Alexandria Bay	
62	Elijah Horr House		June 28, 1996 (#96000666)	East side of NY 180, north of junction with Woodard Rd., Hamlet of Stone Mills; 44°06′49″N 75°58′28″W	Orleans	part of the Orleans MPS
63	Hiram Hubbard House		September 9, 2009 (#09000699)	34237 NY 126; 43°57′41″N 75°41′11″W	Champion	
64	Ingleside		April 16, 1980 (#80002622)	West of Alexandria Bay on Cherry Island; 44°19′58″N 75°55′40″W	Alexandria Bay	
65	Irwin Brothers Store		September 15, 1983 (#83001681)	NY 180; 44°06′46″N 75°58′34″W	Stone Mills	
66	Jefferson County Courthouse Complex	Jefferson County Courthouse Complex	June 7, 1974 (#74001248)	SE corner of Arsenal and Sherman Sts. 43°58′31″N 75°54′51″W	Watertown	
67	Johnson House		September 27, 1985 (#85002466)	Tibbetts Point Rd. 44°06′22″N 76°21′17″W	Cape Vincent	part of the Cape Vincent Town and Village MRA
68	Capt. Simon Johnston House	Capt. Simon Johnston House	June 17, 1982 (#82003358)	507 Riverside Dr. 44°14′31″N 76°05′18″W	Clayton	
69	KESTREL (steam yacht)		August 12, 1977 (#77000873)	George C. Boldt Yacht House, Saint Lawrence River; 44°20′47″N 75°55′37″W	Alexandria Bay	Moored at West New York, New Jersey when listed
70	La Farge Land Office	La Farge Land Office	June 28, 1996 (#96000668)	Junction of Main and Mill Sts., southwest corner, Hamlet of La Fargeville; 44°11′35″N 75°58′03″W	Orleans	part of the Orleans MPS
71	La Farge Retainer Houses	La Farge Retainer Houses	August 21, 1997 (#97000941)	Main St., south of junction of Main St. and Ford Rd. 44°11′28″N 75°58′04″W	Orleans	part of the Orleans MPS
72	La Fargeville United Methodist Church	La Fargeville United Methodist Church	June 28, 1996 (#96000670)	West side of Main St., south of junction with Co. Rt. 181, Hamlet of La Fargeville; 44°11′27″N 75°58′08″W	Orleans	part of the Orleans MPS
73	Lance Farm		September 6, 1990 (#90001323)	S. Shore Rd. 43°58′52″N 76°15′28″W	Lyme	part of the Lyme MRA
74	LeRay Hotel		October 29, 1982 (#82001175)	Main and Noble Sts. 44°05′16″N 75°48′28″W	Evans Mills	
75	LeRay Mansion	LeRay Mansion	July 11, 1974 (#74001245)	Northeast of Black River on Fort Drum Military Reservation; 44°03′00″N 75°45′48″W	Black River	
76	Vincent LeRay House	Vincent LeRay House	November 15, 1973 (#73001195)	Broadway (NY 12E); 44°07′31″N 76°20′34″W	Cape Vincent	part of the Cape Vincent Town and Village MRA
77	LeRaysville Archeological District	LeRaysville Archeological District	November 2, 1995 (#95000069)	Address Restricted	Le Ray	
78	Lewis House		September 27, 1985 (#85002467)	Market St. 44°07′45″N 76°20′18″W	Cape Vincent	part of the Cape Vincent Town and Village MRA
79	Longue Vue Island	Longue Vue Island	November 4, 1982 (#82001176)	St. Lawrence River; 44°18′14″N 75°56′25″W	Alexandria Bay	
80	John Losee House		February 14, 2014 (#14000004)	17100 Cty. Rd. 155; 43°55′01″N 75°55′47″W	Watertown	
81	Madison Barracks	Madison Barracks	November 21, 1974 (#74001246)	Military Rd. 43°57′10″N 76°06′35″W	Sackets Harbor	
82	Methodist Episcopal Church	Methodist Episcopal Church	June 28, 1996 (#96000663)	South side of NY 180, west of junction with Gore Rd., Hamlet of Omar; 44°15′43″N 75°58′35″W	Orleans	part of the Orleans MPS
83	Methodist-Protestant Church at Fisher's Landing	Methodist-Protestant Church at Fisher's Landing	June 28, 1996 (#96000667)	Reed Point Rd., near junction with Co. Rd. 195, Hamlet of Fisher's Landing; 44°16′34″N 76°00′33″W	Orleans	part of the Orleans MPS
84	A. Newton Farm		May 5, 1997 (#97000356)	NY 180, junction with Co. Rd. 13, Hamlet of Omar; 44°15′45″N 75°58′44″W	Orleans	part of the Orleans MPS
85	Norton–Burnham House	Norton–Burnham House	February 23, 2016 (#16000034)	8748 NY 178; 43°50′45″N 76°11′22″W	Henderson	1818 stone house built by early settler was birthplace of City Beautiful movement founder Daniel Burnham
86	Paddock Arcade	Paddock Arcade	June 15, 1976 (#76001224)	Public Square between Arsenal and Stone Sts. 43°58′28″N 75°54′41″W	Watertown	
87	Paddock Mansion	Paddock Mansion	December 11, 1979 (#79001587)	228 Washington St. 43°58′23″N 75°54′43″W	Watertown	
88	Captain Louis Peugnet House		September 27, 1985 (#85002469)	Tibbetts Point Rd. 44°07′02″N 76°21′13″W	Cape Vincent	part of the Cape Vincent Town and Village MRA
89	Pierrepont Manor Complex		September 15, 1977 (#77000943)	North of Mannsville on Ellisburg St. 43°44′04″N 76°03′42″W	Mannsville	
90	Point Salubrious Historic District		September 6, 1990 (#90001339)	Point Salubrious Rd. 44°02′34″N 76°09′20″W	Lyme	part of the Lyme MRA
91	Public Square Historic District	Public Square Historic District	September 7, 1984; March 22, 2016 (#84002409)16000110	J.B. Wise & Park Pls., Arcade & Stone Sts., 43°58′28″N 75°54′37″W	Watertown	
92	Ressequie Farm		October 18, 1989 (#89001622)	Parker Rd. 43°56′05″N 76°02′31″W	Hounsfield	part of the Hounsfield MRA
93	George Reynolds House		September 27, 1985 (#85002470)	River Rd. 44°09′50″N 76°15′38″W	Cape Vincent	part of the Cape Vincent Town and Village MRA
94	George T. Robinson House		April 17, 2017 (#100000893)	15082 Bluff Island; 44°16′09″N 76°04′13″W	Clayton	1901 Shingle Style Thousand Island summer house on island in St. Lawrence built by Pittsburgh steel executive for family
95	Rock Island Light Station	Rock Island Light Station	November 14, 1978 (#78001855)	North of Fishers Landing on Rock Island; 44°16′50″N 76°01′03″W	Fishers Landing	
96	Rogers Brothers Farmstead		May 11, 1998 (#98000392)	Dablon Point Rd. 44°04′52″N 76°20′59″W	Cape Vincent	part of the Cape Vincent Town and Village MRA
97	John N. Rottiers Farm		September 30, 1996 (#96001022)	East side of NY 180, approximately 2 miles (3.2 km) south of the Hamlet of Lafargeville; 44°09′54″N 75°58′29″W	Orleans	part of the Orleans MPS
98	The Row		September 6, 1990 (#90001329)	Main St. at Shaver Creek, Three Mile Bay; 44°04′49″N 76°12′18″W	Lyme	part of the Lyme MRA
99	Roxy Hotel	Roxy Hotel	September 27, 1985 (#85002472)	310 Broadway; 44°07′39″N 76°20′16″W	Cape Vincent	part of the Cape Vincent Town and Village MRA
100	Cornelius Sacket House	Cornelius Sacket House	September 27, 1985 (#85002473)	571 Broadway; 44°07′46″N 76°19′58″W	Cape Vincent	part of the Cape Vincent Town and Village MRA
101	General Sacket House	General Sacket House	September 27, 1985 (#85002464)	4407 James St. 44°07′18″N 76°19′52″W	Cape Vincent	part of the Cape Vincent Town and Village MRA
102	Sackets Harbor Battlefield	Sackets Harbor Battlefield	December 31, 1974 (#74001247)	Coastline and area from Sackets Harbor SW to and including Horse Island; 43°56′43″N 76°07′59″W	Sackets Harbor	
103	Sackets Harbor Village Historic District	Sackets Harbor Village Historic District	September 15, 1983 (#83001683)	Main, Washington, Pike, Edmund, Hill, Hamilton, Broad, and Ambrose Sts. 43°56′44″N 76°07′10″W	Sackets Harbor	
104	St. John's Episcopal Church	St. John's Episcopal Church	September 27, 1985 (#85002476)	Market St. 44°07′30″N 76°20′08″W	Cape Vincent	part of the Cape Vincent Town and Village MRA
105	St. Paul's Church		August 30, 1996 (#96000960)	210 Washington St. 44°00′18″N 75°58′53″W	Brownville	Historic Churches of the Episcopal Diocese of Central New York MPS
106	St. Paul's Episcopal		June 28, 1996 (#96000669)	East side of Main St., south of the junction with Co. Rd. 181, Hamlet of La Fargeville; 44°11′26″N 75°58′05″W	Orleans	part of the Orleans MPS
107	Saint Paul's Episcopal Church	Saint Paul's Episcopal Church	May 23, 1997 (#97000413)	308-314 Clay St. 43°58′19″N 75°54′28″W	Watertown	Historic Churches of the Episcopal Diocese of Central New York MPS
108	St. Vincent of Paul Catholic Church	St. Vincent of Paul Catholic Church	September 27, 1985 (#85002477)	Kanady St. 44°07′28″N 76°20′24″W	Cape Vincent	part of the Cape Vincent Town and Village MRA
109	Shore Farm		October 18, 1989 (#89001623)	Military Rd., east of Mill Creek; 43°57′27″N 76°06′14″W	Hounsfield	part of the Hounsfield MRA
110	Stephen Simmons House		October 18, 1989 (#89001615)	Camps Mills Rd., west of Old Slat Points Rd. 43°56′07″N 76°04′28″W	Hounsfield	part of the Hounsfield MRA
111	Smith-Ripley House	Smith-Ripley House	February 13, 2008 (#08000021)	29 E. Church St. 43°48′40″N 76°01′16″W	Adams	
112	Snell-Gillett House		August 11, 2025 (#100012104)	213 Mill Street; 44°13′00″N 75°47′23″W	Theresa	
113	Star Grange No. 9		October 18, 1989 (#89001626)	Sulphur Springs Rd. between Jericho and Spencer Rds. 43°55′38″N 76°01′40″W	Hounsfield	part of the Hounsfield MRA
114	Otis Starkey House	Otis Starkey House	September 27, 1985 (#85002478)	Point St. 44°07′36″N 76°20′06″W	Cape Vincent	part of the Cape Vincent Town and Village MRA
115	State Street Historic District	State Street Historic District	September 22, 1983 (#83001684)	249-401 State St., 246-274 State St. and 106-108 Mechanic St. 43°58′40″N 75°36′36″W	Carthage	
116	Sterlingville Archeological District	Sterlingville Archeological District	November 2, 1995 (#95000070)	Address Restricted	Philadelphia	
117	Stevenson-Frink Farm		October 18, 1989 (#89001625)	Salt Point Rd. 44°00′10″N 76°03′56″W	Hounsfield	part of the Hounsfield MRA
118	Stone Mills Union Church		December 12, 1976 (#76001223)	NY 180 near junction with Carter St. 44°06′52″N 75°58′27″W	Stone Mills	
119	Storrs' Harbor Naval Shipyard Site	Storrs' Harbor Naval Shipyard Site	February 7, 2012 (#11001091)	Address restricted	Hounsfield vicinity	
120	Old Stone Shop		September 6, 1990 (#90001328)	Main St., Three Mile Bay; 44°04′56″N 76°11′50″W	Lyme	part of the Lyme MRA
121	Byron J. Strough House		January 2, 1997 (#96001549)	South side of Clayton St., west of junction with NY 411, Hamlet of La Fargeville; 44°11′41″N 75°58′10″W	Orleans	part of the Orleans MPS
122	Sulphur Springs Cemetery		October 18, 1989 (#89001620)	Co. Rd. 62, southwest of Spencer Rd. 43°55′27″N 76°01′54″W	Hounsfield	part of the Hounsfield MRA
123	Swarthout Site-A04507.000038	Swarthout Site-A04507.000038	January 24, 2002 (#01001504)	Address Restricted	Clayton	
124	Taft House		September 6, 1990 (#90001297)	Main St., Three Mile Bay; 44°04′50″N 76°12′11″W	Lyme	part of the Lyme MRA
125	Talcott Falls Site	Talcott Falls Site	June 5, 1974 (#74001244)	Address Restricted	Adams	
126	Taylor Boathouse		September 6, 1990 (#90001330)	Bay View Dr., Three Mile Bay; 44°04′46″N 76°12′02″W	Lyme	part of the Lyme MRA
127	Taylor Flats		August 28, 2018 (#100002834)	550 Coffeen St. 43°58′51″N 75°55′15″W	Watertown	1907 apartment building was one of the first upstate to be built for workers with middle-class aspirations.
128	Emma Flower Taylor Mansion	Emma Flower Taylor Mansion	October 10, 2002 (#02001114)	241 Clinton St. 43°58′20″N 75°55′04″W	Watertown	
129	Thomas Memorial AME Zion Church	Thomas Memorial AME Zion Church	March 6, 2002 (#02000144)	715 Morrison St. 43°59′07″N 75°54′55″W	Watertown	
130	Thousand Island Grange Hall		June 28, 1996 (#96000664)	East side of Gore Rd., north of junction with NY 180, Hamlet of Omar; 44°15′40″N 75°58′20″W	Orleans	part of the Orleans MPS
131	Thousand Island Park Historic District	Thousand Island Park Historic District	November 14, 1982 (#82001177)	Generally bounded by Coast Ave. East, Coast Ave. West, Prospect Ave., Park Ave. and Sunset Ave. 44°17′18″N 76°01′33″W	Orleans	Boundary changes approved February 14, 2022.
132	Three Mile Bay Historic District		September 6, 1990 (#90001327)	Junction of Church and Depot Sts., Three Mile Bay; 44°04′56″N 76°11′53″W	Lyme	part of the Lyme MRA
133	Tibbetts Point Light	Tibbetts Point Light	July 19, 1984 (#84002412)	Tibbetts Point; 44°06′02″N 76°22′13″W	Cape Vincent	
134	Tracy Farm		February 14, 1997 (#97000066)	East side of Wilder Rd., south of junction with Overbluff Rd. 44°09′09″N 75°59′56″W	Orleans	part of the Orleans MPS
135	Trinity Episcopal Church and Parish House	Trinity Episcopal Church and Parish House	June 30, 2000 (#00000747)	227 Sherman St. 43°58′24″N 75°54′55″W	Watertown	part of the Historic Churches of the Episcopal Diocese of Central New York MPS
136	Union Hall		September 6, 1990 (#90001333)	S. Shore Rd. 44°00′21″N 76°13′08″W	Lyme	part of the Lyme MRA
137	Union Hotel	Union Hotel	June 19, 1972 (#72000849)	Main and Ray Sts. 43°56′55″N 76°07′24″W	Sackets Harbor	
138	Union Meeting House		September 27, 1985 (#85002479)	Millens Bay Rd. 44°10′19″N 76°14′32″W	Cape Vincent	part of the Cape Vincent Town and Village MRA
139	United Methodist Church		September 6, 1990 (#90001325)	S. Shore Rd. 44°00′24″N 76°13′08″W	Lyme	part of the Lyme MRA
140	US Post Office-Carthage		November 17, 1988 (#88002470)	521 State St. 43°58′49″N 75°36′27″W	Carthage	part of the US Post Offices in New York State, 1858-1943, TR
141	Claude Vautrin House		September 27, 1985 (#85002480)	Mason Rd. 44°08′39″N 76°13′43″W	Cape Vincent	part of the Cape Vincent Town and Village MRA
142	Village of Antwerp Historic District		April 19, 2001 (#01000389)	Roughly Main, Depot, Maple, VanBuren, Mechanic, Fulton, Academy and Washington Sts., Lexington, Hoyt & Madison Aves. 44°11′53″N 75°36′33″W	Antwerp	
143	Vogt House		November 19, 1980 (#80002626)	110 Main St. 44°00′08″N 75°58′52″W	Brownville	part of the Stone Houses of Brownville TR
144	Arthur Walrath House		November 19, 1980 (#80002627)	114 Corner Pike; 44°00′11″N 75°58′55″W	Brownville	part of the Stone Houses of Brownville TR
145	Watertown Masonic Temple	Watertown Masonic Temple	January 23, 1980 (#80002629)	240 Washington St. 43°58′23″N 75°54′42″W	Watertown	
146	Menzo Wheeler House		September 6, 1990 (#90001335)	Main and Depot Sts. 44°04′52″N 76°11′53″W	Chaumont	part of the Lyme MRA
147	Wilcox Farmhouse		September 6, 1990 (#90001331)	Carrying Place Rd. 44°03′33″N 76°15′25″W	Three Mile Bay	part of the Lyme MRA
148	Warren Wilson House		September 27, 1985 (#85002482)	Favret Rd. 44°07′49″N 76°16′27″W	Cape Vincent	part of the Cape Vincent Town and Village MRA
149	Amos Wood House		January 4, 2012 (#11001000)	7751 County Road 120; 43°44′28″N 76°10′51″W	North Landing vicinity; Ellisburg	
150	Wood's Grist Mill	Wood's Grist Mill	November 2, 1995 (#95000072)	Address Restricted	Wilna	

== See also ==
- National Register of Historic Places listings in New York
