= Tracy House (disambiguation) =

Tracy House is a Frank Lloyd Wright-designed house in Normandy Park, Washington.

Tracy House may also refer to:

- Tracy Inn, Tracy, California, listed on the NRHP in San Joaquin County, California
- Tracy-Causer Block, Portland, Maine, listed on the National Register of Historic Places in Portland, Maine
- Tracy Farm, Orleans, New York, listed on the NRHP in Jefferson County, New York
- Purdum-Tracy House, Portsmouth, Ohio, listed on the NRHP in Scioto County, Ohio
- Lee Tracy House, Shelburne, Vermont, listed on the National Register of Historic Places in Chittenden County, Vermont
