= Stephen Simmons =

Stephen Simmons may refer to:

- Stephen Simmons (hanged 1830), last case of capital punishment in Michigan under state law
- Stephen Simmons (footballer) (born 1982), Scottish footballer
- Stephen Simmons (boxer) (born 1984), Scottish boxer

== See also ==
- Stephen Simmons House, a historic home built 1818 located at Hounsfield in Jefferson County, New York
