= Walrath =

Walrath is a surname. Notable people with the surname include:

- Christopher A. Walrath (c. 1830–1897), American merchant and politician
- Jack Walrath (born 1946), American jazz musician
- Patricia Walrath (born 1941), American politician

== Other ==
- Arthur Walrath House
