= Wilcox Farmhouse (Three Mile Bay, New York) =

Historic house in New York, United States

- U.S. National Register of Historic Places
- Location within New York Location within the United States
- Nearest city: Three Mile Bay, New York
- Coordinates: 44°3′33″N 76°15′25″W
- Area: 30 acres (12 ha)
- Built: 1839
- Architectural style: Greek Revival
- MPS: Lyme MRA
- NRHP reference No.: 90001331
- Added to NRHP: September 06, 1990

Wilcox Farmhouse is a historic home located at Three Mile Bay in Jefferson County, New York. It was built about 1839 and is a gable ell limestone house consisting of 2 1/2-story, three-by-four-bay gable front block, a 1 1/2-story three-bay-square lateral wing, and a 1-story two-by-four-bay anterior wing extending behind the lateral wing. Also on the property is a contemporary privy.

It was listed on the National Register of Historic Places in 1990.
