= Lee Tracy House =

Historic house in Vermont, United States

- U.S. National Register of Historic Places
- U.S. Historic district – Contributing property
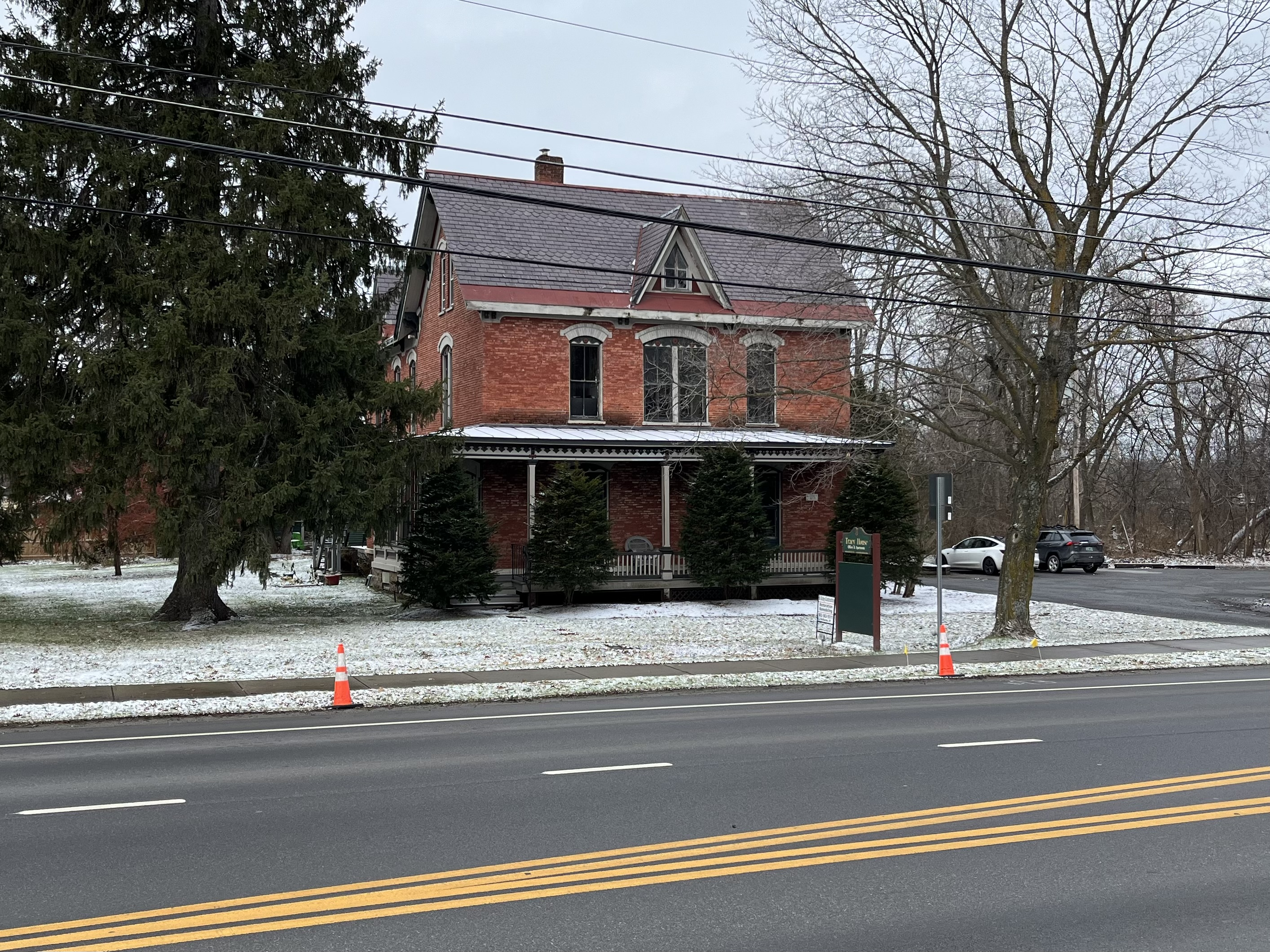

- Location within Vermont Location within the United States
- Location: US 7, Shelburne, Vermont
- Coordinates: 44°22′54″N 73°13′42″W
- Area: 1.2 acres (0.49 ha)
- Built: 1875
- Architect: Edgerton?
- Architectural style: Italianate, Gothic Revival
- Part of: Shelburne Village Historic District (ID90001055)
- NRHP reference No.: 83004226

Significant dates
- Added to NRHP: December 22, 1983
- Designated CP: July 27, 1990

The Lee Tracy House is a historic house on United States Route 7 in the village center of Shelburne, Vermont. Built in 1875, it is one of a small number of brick houses built in the town in the late 19th century, and is architecturally a distinctive vernacular blend of Gothic and Italianate styles. It was listed on the National Register of Historic Places in 1983.

== Description and history ==
The Lee Tracy House stands near the center of Shelburne village, on the west side of US 7 a short way north of its junction with Harbor Road. It is a 2 1/2-story brick building, with a side gable roof. The roof is steeply pitched in the Gothic style, and has a front-facing central gable. The front facade is three bays wide, with a single-story porch extending around the south side to a polygonal bay. On the ground floor, only the outer bays have windows, both elongated sash. On the second floor, the windows are set in segmented-arch openings, with stone sills and headers; the central bay is larger, with a pair of windows in the opening. The main entrance is on the north side of the house, set under a separate porch, featuring the same elaborate woodwork found on that facing the road. A contemporary two-story ell extends to the rear of the main block, and the property also includes a period carriage barn.

The house was built in 1875 for Lee Tracy, a local wool trader. Family lore claims that a man named Edgerton was responsible for its design, which is clearly based on the principles laid out by Calvert Vaux in his treatise Villas and Cottages. Although it is not as elaborate as some Gothic and Italianate houses, its massing and scale are clearly within those styles, as are its relatively modest stylistic details.

== See also ==
- National Register of Historic Places listings in Chittenden County, Vermont
