= Gen. Jacob Brown Mansion =

Historic house in New York, United States

- U.S. National Register of Historic Places
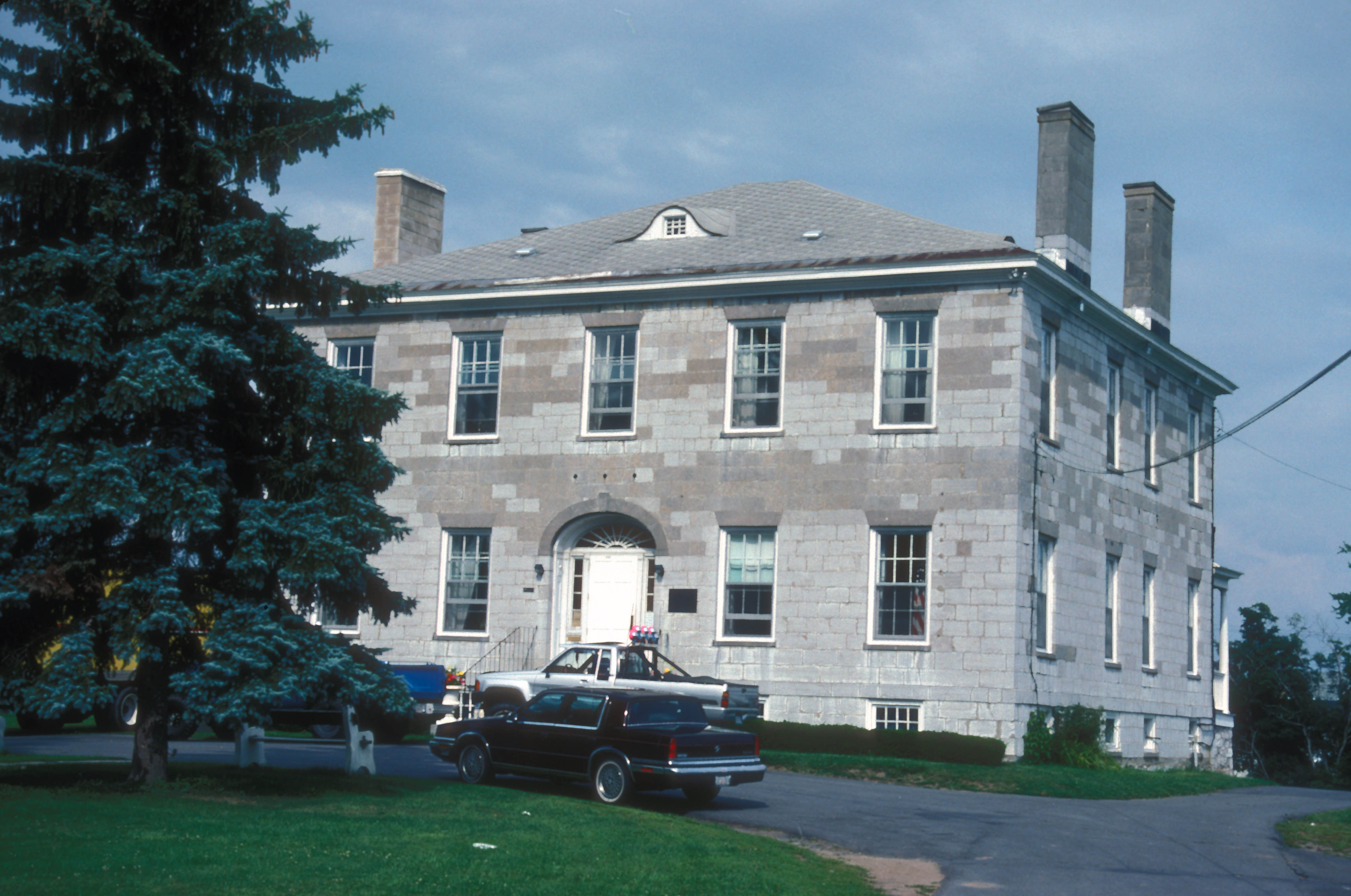

- Location within New York Location within the United States
- Location: Brown Blvd., Brownville, New York
- Coordinates: 44°0′19″N 75°59′0″W
- Area: 4.2 acres (1.7 ha)
- Built: 1811
- Architectural style: Georgian, Federal
- MPS: Stone Houses of Brownville TR
- NRHP reference No.: 80002624
- Added to NRHP: November 19, 1980

Gen. Jacob Brown Mansion is a historic home located at Brownville in Jefferson County, New York. It is a two-story limestone structure built from 1811 to 1815. It is currently owned by the Village of Brownville, and serves as the community center, village offices, and library.

It was listed on the National Register of Historic Places in 1980.

== See also ==
- General Jacob Jennings Brown
- Brownville, New York
- National Register of Historic Places listings in Jefferson County, New York
