= William Van Waters =

American politician

William Van Waters was a member of the Wisconsin State Assembly.

== Biography ==
Van Waters was born on October 7, 1817, in Hounsfield, New York. He later settled in Hamilton, Wisconsin, where he was a farmer.

== Political career ==
Van Waters was a member of the Assembly during the 1877 session. Previously, he had been an unsuccessful candidate in 1874. Additionally, Van Waters was Chairman of the Town Board (similar to city council) of Hamilton. He was a Democrat.
