= Brownville Hotel =

Historic house in New York, United States

- U.S. National Register of Historic Places
- Location within New York Location within the United States
- Location: Brown Blvd. and W. Main St., Brownville, New York
- Coordinates: 44°0′10″N 75°59′2″W
- Area: 0.5 acres (0.20 ha)
- Built: 1820
- MPS: Stone Houses of Brownville TR
- NRHP reference No.: 80002625
- Added to NRHP: November 19, 1980

Brownville Hotel was a historic hotel located in the village of Brownville in Jefferson County, New York. It is a stone structure built about 1820.

The building was listed on the National Register of Historic Places in 1980. It was located on the corner of Brown Boulevard and West Main Street. The roof collapsed in November 1995, and the building was demolished shortly thereafter. The site is now occupied by a Stewart's Shop.
