= Dr. Samuel Guthrie House =

Historic house in New York, United States

- U.S. National Register of Historic Places
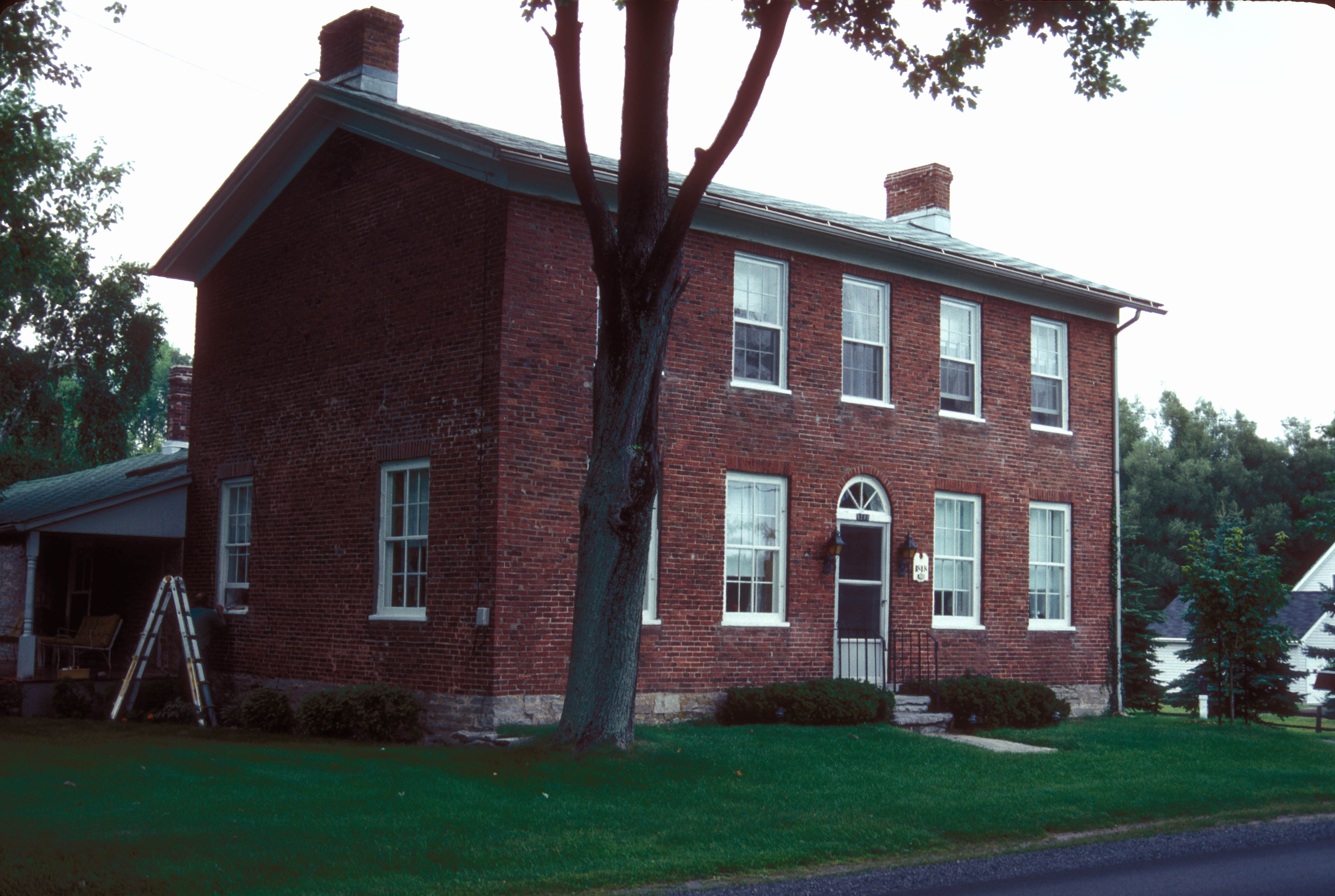

- Location within New York Location within the United States
- Location: Co. Rd. 75/Military Rd., Hounsfield, New York
- Coordinates: 43°57′5″N 76°5′36″W
- Area: 3 acres (1.2 ha)
- Built: 1818
- Architectural style: Federal
- MPS: Hounsfield MRA
- NRHP reference No.: 89001616
- Added to NRHP: October 18, 1989

Dr. Samuel Guthrie House is a historic home located at Hounsfield in Jefferson County, New York. The home comprises a rectangular two-story, five-by-two-bay, brick Federal style core building and a rectangular one-story rear wing. The rear wing is in three sections: a section constructed around 1822, an addition from the early 20th century, and a third from about 1910.

It was listed on the National Register of Historic Places in 1989.
