= Ressequie Farm =

Historic house in New York, United States

- U.S. National Register of Historic Places
- Location within New York Location within the United States
- Location: Parker Rd., Hounsfield, New York
- Coordinates: 43°56′5″N 76°2′31″W
- Area: 20 acres (8.1 ha)
- Built: 1840
- Architectural style: Greek Revival
- MPS: Hounsfield MRA
- NRHP reference No.: 89001622
- Added to NRHP: October 18, 1989

Ressequie Farm is a historic farm complex located at Hounsfield in Jefferson County, New York. The farm complex consists of a 1 1/2-story gabled ell, L-shaped farmhouse built about 1840 in the Greek Revival style and five outbuildings. Contributing outbuildings are a cattle barn, granary, pig house, chicken coop, and former carriage house.

It was listed on the National Register of Historic Places in 1989.

== Samuel Resseguie ==
The home was built by Samuel Resseguie and his wife Lydia Brown, who came to the area shortly after their marriage in 1822. Samuel was born 28 November 1800 in Northampton, Fulton Co., New York, son of Daniel Resseguie and Mary Monroe. Lydia was born around 1800 in Saratoga, New York, daughter of John Brown and Lydia Sprague.

Morris' history of the Resseguie family (1888) states:

With his newly married wife Mr. Resseguie removed to Houndsfield, making the journey with a yoke of cattle, and spending seven days on the way, their road being indicated by 'blazed' trees. They settled on a farm of fifty acres, which, by industry and economy, had been increased to 220 acres at the time of his death.

Samuel died on 24 March 1853. Lydia died 8 July 1882 or 1883. They are both buried in Sulpher Springs Cemetery on the nearby Sulpher Springs Road.

In the 1960s, the home was occupied by the Chandler family.

Today, the property still serves as a private residence, and is well maintained. The crossroad immediately to the west of the property is called the "Resseguie Road."
