= Elijah Horr House =

Historic house in New York, United States

- U.S. National Register of Historic Places
- Location within New York Location within the United States
- Location: E side of NY 180, N of jct. with Woodard Rd., Hamlet of Stone Mills, Orleans, New York
- Coordinates: 44°6′49″N 75°58′28″W
- Area: 4.3 acres (1.7 ha)
- Built: 1835
- Architectural style: Federal
- MPS: Orleans MPS
- NRHP reference No.: 96000666
- Added to NRHP: June 28, 1996

Elijah Horr House is a historic home located at Orleans in Jefferson County, New York. It is a two-story, five-bay structure built about 1835 and is constructed of local limestone with Federal style detailing. The center entrance features an elliptical segmented arch with a large keystone. Also on the property is a wood hen house constructed about 1870.

It was listed on the National Register of Historic Places in 1996.
