= Shore Farm =

Historic house in New York, United States

- U.S. National Register of Historic Places
- Location within New York Location within the United States
- Location: Military Rd., E of Mill Creek, Hounsfield, New York
- Coordinates: 43°57′27″N 76°6′14″W
- Area: 114 acres (46 ha)
- Built: 1822
- MPS: Hounsfield MRA
- NRHP reference No.: 89001623
- Added to NRHP: October 18, 1989

Shore Farm, historically known as "Shore Farm Camp," is a historic farm complex located at Hounsfield in Jefferson County, New York. The farm complex consists of the Luff/Wardwell House, a former tenant house/milk house, and a cattle barn. The house is a stone and wood-frame structure dating to about 1822 and enlarged about 1895. Also on the property are non-contributing cabins and cottages.

It was listed on the National Register of Historic Places in 1989.
