= Lance Farm =

- U.S. National Register of Historic Places
- Location within New York Location within the United States
- Location: S. Shore Rd., Lyme, New York
- Coordinates: 43°58′52″N 76°15′28″W
- Area: 189 acres (76 ha)
- Built: 1860
- Architect: Gamble & Sons
- MPS: Lyme MRA
- NRHP reference No.: 90001323
- Added to NRHP: September 06, 1990

Lance Farm is a historic farm complex located at Lyme in Jefferson County, New York. The complex includes the farmhouse, a cattle barn, horse barn, a granary, forge, and milkhouse. The farmhouse was built in 1908 and is a large 2 1/2-story light-wood-frame building on a limestone foundation. The granary, forge, and milkhouse date to the 1850s.

It was listed on the National Register of Historic Places in 1990.
