= Three Mile Bay Historic District =

Historic district in New York, United States

- U.S. National Register of Historic Places
- U.S. Historic district
- Location within New York Location within the United States
- Location: Junction of Church and Depot Sts., Three Mile Bay, Lyme, New York
- Coordinates: 44°4′56″N 76°11′53″W
- Area: 3 acres (1.2 ha)
- Built: 1840
- Architectural style: Greek Revival, Italianate
- MPS: Lyme MRA
- NRHP reference No.: 90001327
- Added to NRHP: September 6, 1990

Three Mile Bay Historic District is a national historic district located at Lyme near Chaumont in Jefferson County, New York. The district includes six contributing buildings. The four principal buildings are a church, its associated parsonage, a grange hall, and a four-room schoolhouse.

It was listed on the National Register of Historic Places in 1990.
