= Taft House (Chaumont, New York) =

Historic house in New York, United States

- U.S. National Register of Historic Places
- Location within New York Location within the United States
- Location: Main St., Three Mile Bay, Lyme, New York
- Coordinates: 44°4′50″N 76°12′11″W
- Area: less than one acre
- Built: 1908
- Architect: Gamble & Sons
- Architectural style: Bungalow/Craftsman, Stick/Eastlake, Queen Anne
- MPS: Lyme MRA
- NRHP reference No.: 90001297
- Added to NRHP: September 06, 1990

Taft House is a historic home located at Lyme in Jefferson County, New York. It was built in 1908 and is a light wood-frame dwelling consisting of a 2 1/2-story gable-fronted main block and a 1-story rear kitchen wing on a limestone foundation. Also on the property is a heavy wood-frame gable front carriage barn.

It was listed on the National Register of Historic Places in 1990.
