= St. Paul's Episcopal (Orleans, New York) =

Historic church in New York, United States

- U.S. National Register of Historic Places
- Location within New York Location within the United States
- Location: E side of Main St., S of jct with Co. Rd. 181, Hamlet of La Fargeville, Orleans, New York
- Coordinates: 44°11′26″N 75°58′5″W
- Area: less than one acre
- Built: 1878
- Architect: UNKNOWN
- Architectural style: Stick/Eastlake, Late Gothic Revival
- MPS: Orleans MPS
- NRHP reference No.: 96000669
- Added to NRHP: June 28, 1996

St. Paul's Episcopal, also known as the Church of the Nazarene, is a historic Episcopal church located at Orleans in Jefferson County, New York. The church was built in 1878 and is a small wood frame Queen Anne-style edifice with Gothic Revival details. A truncated, square engaged bell tower was added in 1908. The church changed hands to be the Church of the Nazarene about 1900 and was used as such until 1994.

It was listed on the National Register of Historic Places in 1996.
