= Bedford Creek Bridge =

- U.S. National Register of Historic Places
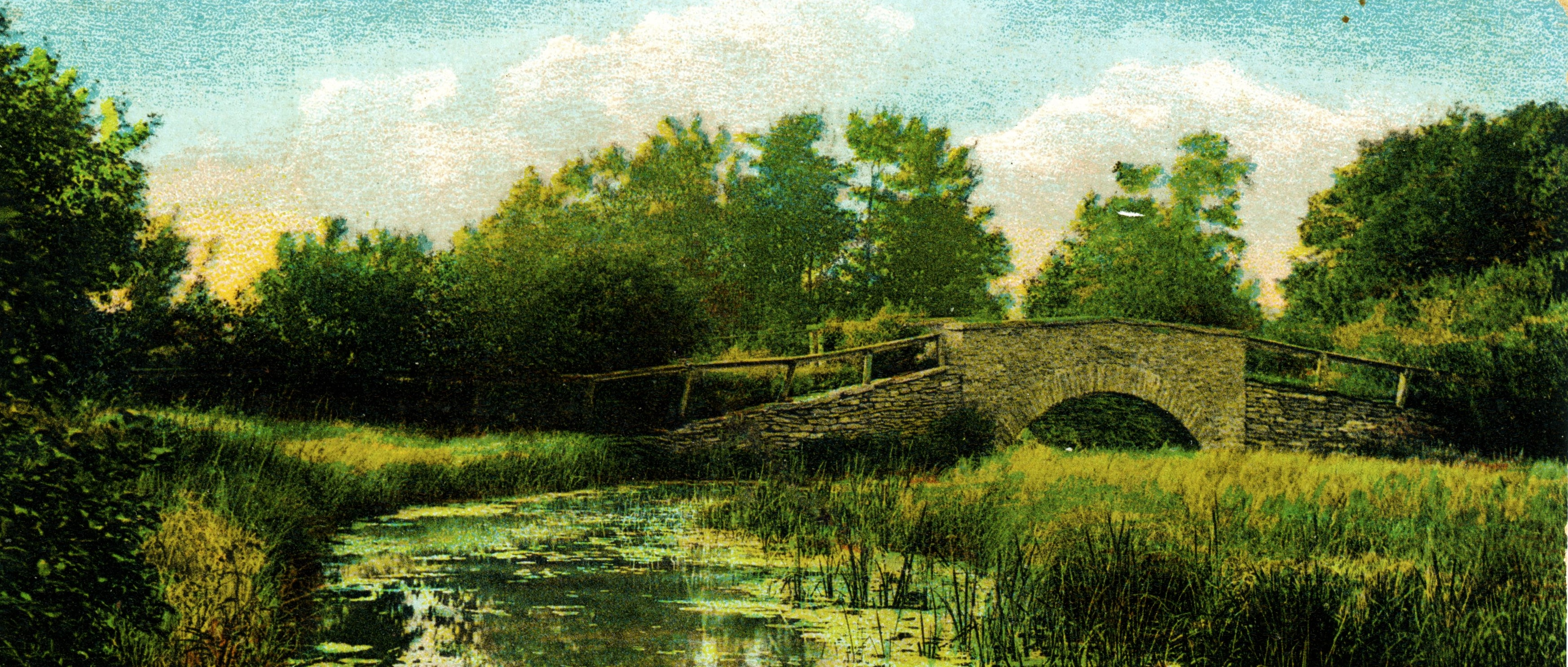
- Early 20th century postcard featuring the bridge

- Location within New York Location within the United States
- Location: Campbell's Point Road over Bedford Creek, Hounsfield, New York
- Coordinates: 43°54′32″N 76°7′12″W
- Area: less than one acre
- Built: 1825
- Architectural style: Stone arch bridge
- MPS: Hounsfield MRA
- NRHP reference No.: 89001617
- Added to NRHP: October 18, 1989

Bedford Creek Bridge is a historic stone arch bridge located at Hounsfield in Jefferson County, New York. It was constructed in 1825 and spans the Bedford Creek. It is a vernacular, semi-circular stone arch bridge, with a span of 18 feet, 6 inches, and measuring 24 feet long and 21 feet wide.

It was listed on the National Register of Historic Places in 1989.
