= Getman Farmhouse =

Historic house in New York, United States

- U.S. National Register of Historic Places
- Location within New York Location within the United States
- Location: S. Shore Rd., Lyme, New York
- Coordinates: 43°58′31″N 76°16′25″W
- Area: 29 acres (12 ha)
- Built: 1860
- Architectural style: Greek Revival, Vernacular Greek Revival
- MPS: Lyme MRA
- NRHP reference No.: 90001322
- Added to NRHP: September 6, 1990

Getman Farmhouse is a historic home located at Lyme in Jefferson County, New York. The wood structure, built about 1860, consists of a 1 1/2-story, three-by-two-bay gable-ended front block and a three-by-five-bay anterior wing.

It was listed on the National Register of Historic Places in 1990.
