= Buttermilk Flat Schoolhouse No. 22 =

- U.S. National Register of Historic Places
- Location within New York Location within the United States
- Location: S side of Buttermilk Flat Rd., E of jct. with Carter St. Rd.,, Orleans, New York
- Coordinates: 44°10′23″N 75°56′57″W
- Area: 9.7 acres (3.9 ha)
- Built: 1850
- MPS: Orleans MPS
- NRHP reference No.: 96000671
- Added to NRHP: June 28, 1996

Buttermilk Flat Schoolhouse No. 22 is a historic one-room school building located at Orleans in Jefferson County, New York. It is a 1 1/2-story, rectangular (20 feet by 30 feet) clapboard-sided frame structure built about 1850. It was last used as a school in 1932.

It was listed on the National Register of Historic Places in 1996.
