= Grenadier Island, New York =

Grenadier Island
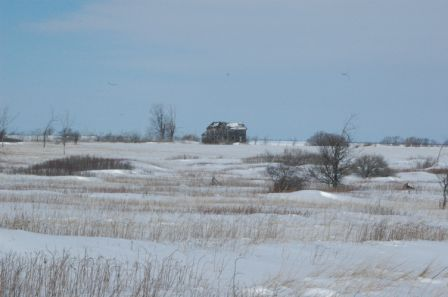
- View of Grenadier Island in the winter.

- Location within New York

Geography
- Location: St. Lawrence River
- Coordinates: 44.043°N 76.364°W
- Area: 1,290 acres (520 ha)
- Length: 2.3 mi (3.7 km)
- Width: 1.4 mi (2.3 km)
- Highest elevation: 279 ft (85 m)

Administration
- United States
- State: New York
- Counties: Jefferson
- Towns: Cape Vincent

Grenadier Island is a 1,290-acre (5.2 km^{2}) island located two miles (3.2 km) out from Mud Bay in the town of Cape Vincent, Jefferson County, New York, United States. The island is 2.3 miles (3.7 km) long and 1.4 miles (2.3 km) wide.

== History ==
Grenadier Island's first official settlement was by John Mitchel in the early 19th century, followed by the Bedford family. At least 14 families had settled upon the island prior to the official grant of a land patent in 1824, and these prior inhabitants were reluctant to give up their holdings as the island's land began to be sold by the new owners. Early industry on the island consisted primarily of fishing, in addition to lumbering and farming.

It was visited by General James Wilkinson and his troops after retreating from the St. Lawrence River in 1812, when he landed his fleet in Basin Harbor.

The island was at one time alternately known as Isle aux Chevreuils.

== Extant buildings ==
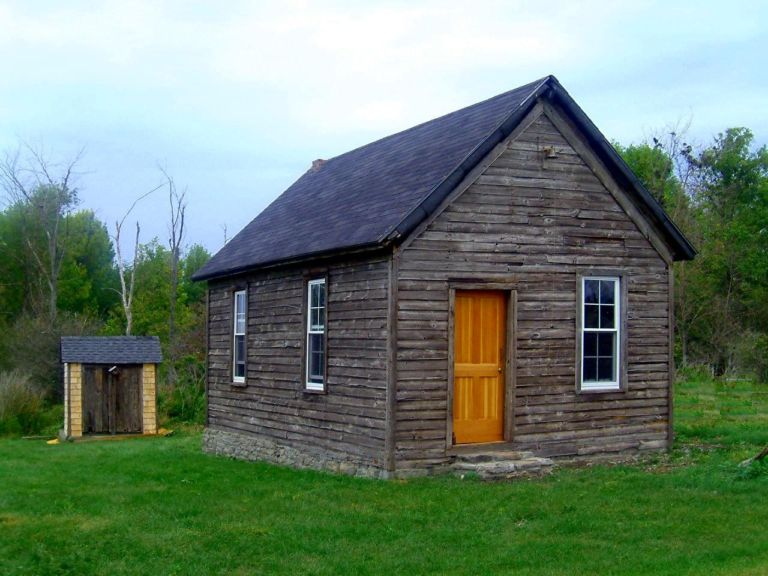
Grenadier Island schoolhouse

There are three buildings from the 19th century still standing on the island: The Schoolhouse, the Humphrey farm house, and the Stone House. The Stone House is located in the northeast corner of the island, while the Humphrey house and Schoolhouse are both in the middle of the island, closer to the northern shore.

=== Schoolhouse ===
The Grenadier Island Schoolhouse is located in the middle of the island. It has a single room with an outhouse situated behind it. In the early 20th century it had around 13 students. It was added to the National Register of Historic Places in 2012.

=== Humphrey farm house ===
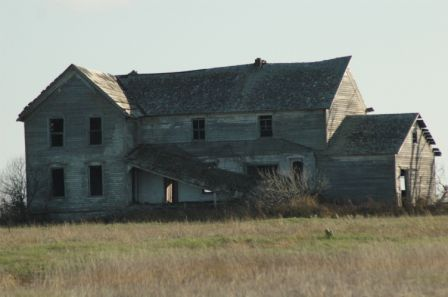
Humphrey farm house

The Humphrey farm house, also known as the "Carbide House", was a two-story home with a basement and an attic. The house has been abandoned for many decades, and has been gradually falling in upon itself for many years (as of 2014). The walls of the home eventually caved in at an unknown date.
