= Abingdon and New Abingdon Apartments =

Coordinates: 43.971737893462986°N 75.9190930816933°W

- U.S. National Register of Historic Places
- NRHP reference No.: 100003114
- Added to NRHP: January 12, 2019

Abingdon and New Abingdon Apartments is a Historic building in Watertown, New York. It was nominated to be added to the NRHP in October 2018 and was added in January 2019.
