= Byron J. Strough House =

Historic house in New York, United States

- U.S. National Register of Historic Places
- Location within New York Location within the United States
- Location: 20192 County Rd 181, (S side of Clayton St., W of jct. with NY 411) Hamlet of La Fargeville, Orleans, New York 13656
- Coordinates: 44°11′41″N 75°58′10″W
- Area: 1.1 acres (0.45 ha)
- Built: 1911
- Architectural style: Classical Revival
- MPS: Orleans MPS
- NRHP reference No.: 96001549
- Added to NRHP: January 2, 1997

Byron J. Strough House is a historic home located at Orleans in Jefferson County, New York. It is a 1 1/2-story, seven-by-five-bay structure built in 1911 with eclectic Classical Revival design features. It features a hipped roof with low, horizontal massing and a prominent full-width front porch. Also on the property are a one car garage and small ice house.

It was listed on the National Register of Historic Places in 1997.
