= La Farge Retainer Houses =

Historic houses in New York, United States

- U.S. National Register of Historic Places
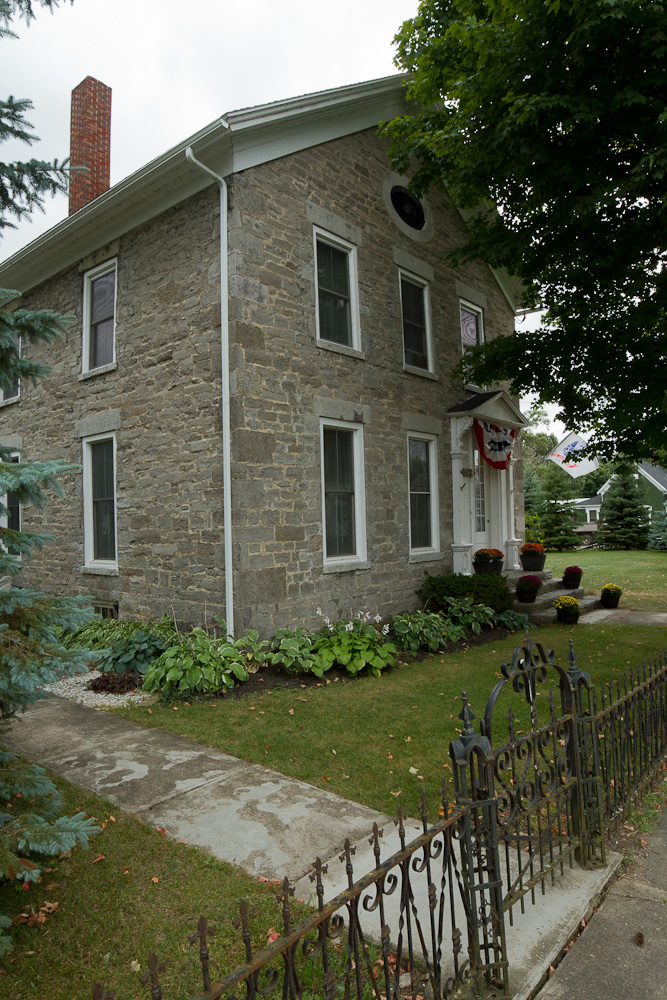
- Biddlecom House

- Location within New York Location within the United States
- Location: Main St., S of jct. of Main St. and Ford Rd., Orleans, New York
- Coordinates: 44°11′28″N 75°58′4″W
- Area: 6 acres (2.4 ha)
- Built: 1838
- Architectural style: Early Republic, Federal
- MPS: Orleans MPS
- NRHP reference No.: 97000941
- Added to NRHP: August 21, 1997

La Farge Retainer Houses, also known as Biddlecom House and Budlong House, are two historic homes located at Orleans, Jefferson County, New York. They were built about 1835. The Biddlecom House is a 2-story, front-gabled limestone building with a side hall entry and 1 1/2-story rear wing. Also on the property is a small frame garage, decorative cast iron fence, stone wall, and stone carriage step. The Budlong House is a 2-story, front-gabled limestone building with a 1 1/2-story rear wing. They were built by land speculator and French merchant, John La Farge, as "model homes" to attract new settlers to the region.

It was listed on the National Register of Historic Places in 1997.

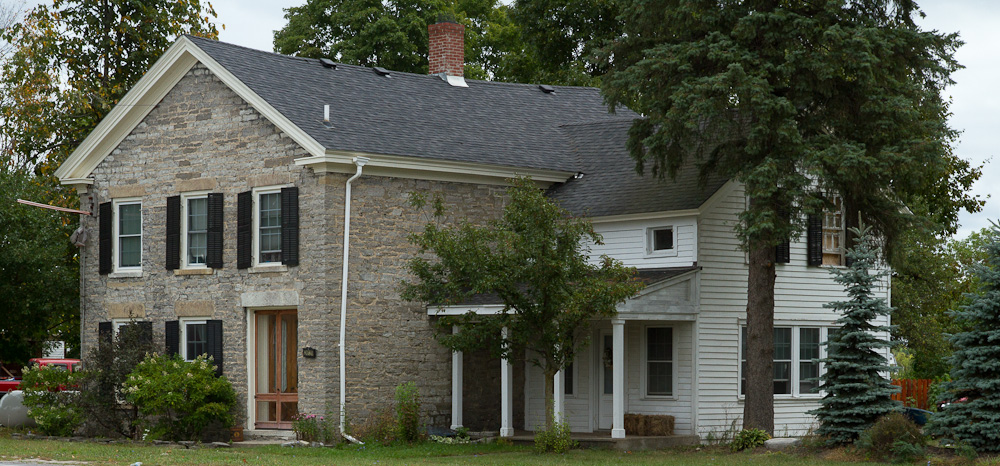
Budlong House
