= Lyme, New York =

- Town
- Location within New York Location within the United States
- Coordinates: 44°3′58″N 76°10′27″W
- Country: United States
- State: New York
- County: Jefferson

Government
  - Type: Town Council
  - Town Supervisor: Mark Zegarelli (R)
  - Town Council: Members' List: • Jennifer Kingsley (R); • Greg Hoppel (R); • Donald Bourquin (R); • Julia Gosier (D)

Area
  - Total: 107.45 sq mi (278.29 km^{2})
  - Land: 55.85 sq mi (144.65 km^{2})
  - Water: 51.59 sq mi (133.63 km^{2})
- Elevation: 249 ft (76 m)

Population (2010)
  - Total: 2,185
  - Estimate (2016): 2,152
  - Density: 38.5/sq mi (14.88/km^{2})
- Time zone: UTC-5 (Eastern (EST))
  - Summer (DST): UTC-4 (EDT)
- ZIP Codes: 13622 (Chaumont); 13693 (Three Mile Bay); 13618 (Cape Vincent); 13624 (Clayton)
- FIPS code: 36-045-43863
- GNIS feature ID: 0979173
- Website: townoflymeny.gov

Lyme is a town in Jefferson County, New York, United States. The population was 2,185 at the 2010 census. The settlements of Chaumont and Three Mile Bay are located within the town. Lyme is in the western part of Jefferson County and is northwest of Watertown.

== History ==
A prehistoric occupation area from the Middle Woodland Period is known as the Point Peninsula complex.

A common belief is that early explorers visited this town during the 16th century.

Settlement began around 1802. Due to the large expanse of low-lying land, there was a great deal of sickness in the town.

During the War of 1812, the inhabitants built a fort, but tore it down after visiting British officials assured them no harm would come to them if they removed fortifications.

Residents Ira Polley (Polly) and Chauncey Bugby (later Buckby) were active combatants supporting the Republic of Canada and Canadian independence in the Patriot War (1837). They were captured and sentenced to exile to Van Diemen's Land (Tasmania) in Australia. Both men were subsequently released but elected to remain in Australia, married, and have numerous descendants today.

The town of Lyme was organized from part of the town of Brownville in 1818. In 1849, the northern part of Lyme was used to form the town of Cape Vincent.

The hamlet of Chaumont set itself off from the town in 1874 by incorporation as a village.

District School No. 3 at Putnam Corners, Evans-Gaige-Dillenback House, Getman Farmhouse, and Lance Farm were added to the National Register of Historic Places in 1990.

== Geography ==
According to the United States Census Bureau, the town of Lyme has a total area of 107.0 square miles (277.1 km^{2}), of which 55.8 square miles (144.6 km^{2}) are land and 51.2 square miles (132.6 km^{2}), or 47.83%, are water. The western boundary of Lyme is Lake Ontario, but most of the coastline comprises the shoreline of Chaumont Bay, which is entirely within Lyme.

New York State Route 12E is an east-west highway through Lyme.

== Demographics ==
Historical population
Census	Pop.	Note	%±
1820	1,724		—
1830	2,872		66.6%
1840	5,472		90.5%
1850	2,939		−46.3%
1860	2,702		−8.1%
1870	2,465		−8.8%
1880	2,277		−7.6%
1890	2,175		−4.5%
1900	2,200		1.1%
1910	1,955		−11.1%
1920	1,642		−16.0%
1930	1,585		−3.5%
1940	1,462		−7.8%
1950	1,458		−0.3%
1960	1,448		−0.7%
1970	1,550		7.0%
1980	1,695		9.4%
1990	1,701		0.4%
2000	2,015		18.5%
2010	2,185		8.4%
2016 (est.)	2,152		−1.5%
U.S. Decennial Census

As of the census of 2000, there were 2,015 people, 813 households, and 573 families residing in the town. The population density was 35.9 inhabitants per square mile (13.9/km^{2}). There were 2,183 housing units at an average density of 38.9 per square mile (15.0/km^{2}). The racial makeup of the town was 97.42% White, 1.14% African American, 0.40% Native American, 0.10% Asian, 0.15% from other races, and 0.79% from two or more races. Hispanic or Latino of any race were 0.79% of the population.

There were 813 households, out of which 27.4% had children under the age of 18 living with them, 60.4% were married couples living together, 7.1% had a female householder with no husband present, and 29.5% were non-families. 24.5% of all households were made up of individuals, and 13.0% had someone living alone who was 65 years of age or older. The average household size was 2.46 and the average family size was 2.94.

In the town, the population was spread out, with 22.7% under the age of 18, 6.7% from 18 to 24, 25.8% from 25 to 44, 27.2% from 45 to 64, and 17.6% who were 65 years of age or older. The median age was 43 years. For every 100 females, there were 99.5 males. For every 100 females age 18 and over, there were 96.7 males.

The median income for a household in the town was $37,569, and the median income for a family was $43,068. Males had a median income of $32,554 versus $23,333 for females. The per capita income for the town was $19,522. About 6.2% of families and 10.2% of the population were below the poverty line, including 13.2% of those under age 18 and 7.1% of those age 65 or over.

== Communities and locations in Lyme ==
- Ashland Flats Wildlife Management Area – A conservation area by the northern town line.
- Chaumont – A village at the shore of Chaumont Bay on NY-12E. The village is on the south side of the Chaumont River, which empties into Chaumont Bay at that location.
- Chaumont Bay – A large bay of Lake Ontario, entirely within the town, enclosed by Point Peninsula and the mainland.
- Cherry Island – An island southwest of Point Salubrious.
- Clines Point – A location on the eastern side of Point Peninsula.
- Fir Island – A small island near the tip of Point Salubrious.
- Herrick Grove – A lakeside hamlet located on the south side of Three Mile Point, northwest of Chaumont village.
- Horse Creek – A stream flowing past the south side of Chaumont.
- Independence Point – A peninsula projecting into Chaumont Bay southwest of Chaumont village.
- Isthmus-Flanders Road – Area that transitions between the mainland and Point Peninsula.
- Long Point – A location on the northeastern shore of Point Peninsula.
- Long Point State Park – A state park on the northeastern side of Point Peninsula.
- Point Peninsula – A peninsula connected to the remainder of the town by a narrow isthmus, called "The Isthmus."
- Point Peninsula – A hamlet on the southeast shore of Point Peninsula on County Road 57. Union Hall and United Methodist Church were added to the National Register of Historic Places in 1990.
- Point Salubrious – A peninsula south of Chaumont village. Point Salubrious Historic District was added to the National Register of Historic Places in 1990.
- Sawmill Bay – A small bay south of Chaumont.
- Shangra-La – A commercial camping area on the eastern side of Point Peninsula facing Chaumont Bay.
- Three Mile Bay – A lakeside hamlet (and census-designated place) located on an arm of Chaumont Bay called Three Mile Bay. The Row, Old Stone Shop, Taft House, Taylor Boathouse, and Three Mile Bay Historic District were added to the National Register of Historic Places in 1990.
- Three Mile Creek – A stream in the northern part of Lyme that flows into Three Mile Bay.
- Three Mile Point – A peninsula enclosing Three Mile Bay on the south.
- Toad Hole Cove – A small bay at the southwestern part of Point Peninsula.

== Adjacent towns and areas ==
The town is southeast of the town of Cape Vincent and west of the towns of Brownville and Clayton. The western side of the town is defined by Lake Ontario.
