= Central Garage =

Historic commercial building in New York, United States

- U.S. National Register of Historic Places
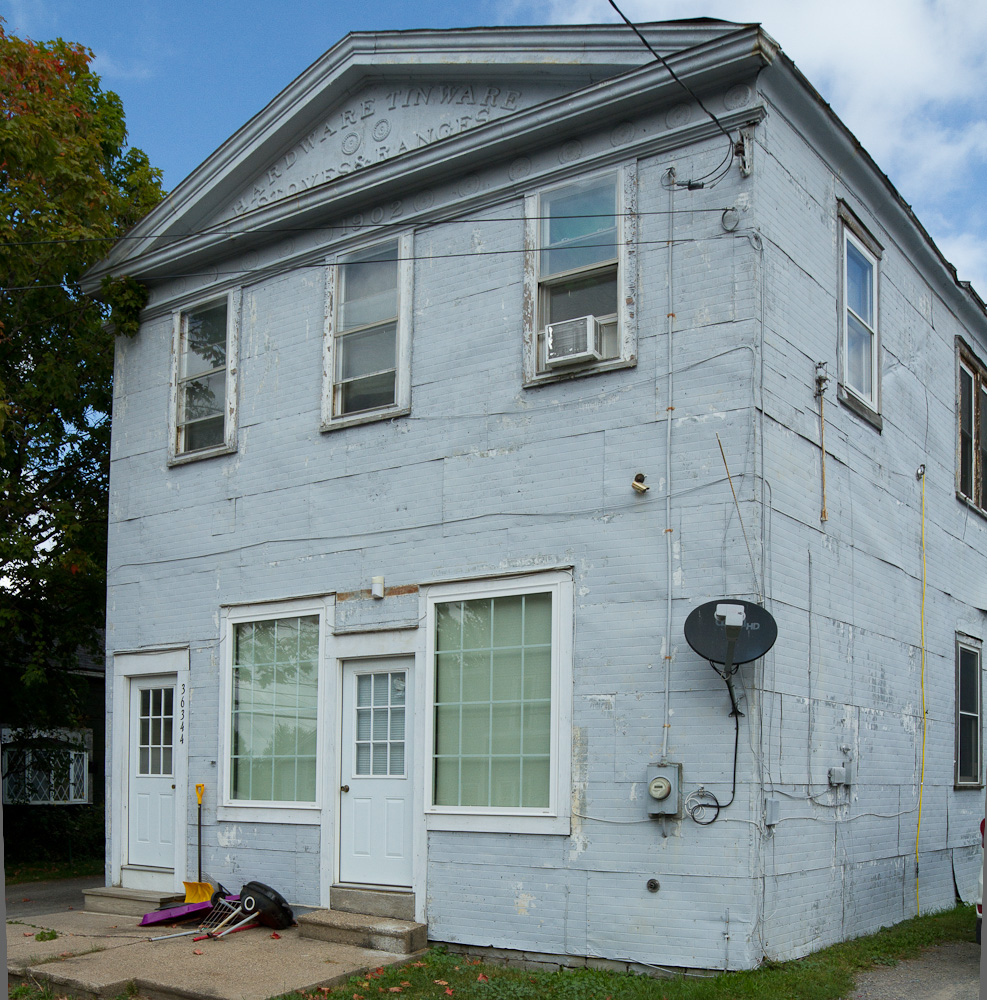

- Location within New York Location within the United States
- Location: N. side of Clayton St., W of jct. with Main St., Hamlet of La Fargeville, Orleans, New York
- Coordinates: 44°11′41″N 75°58′0″W
- Area: less than one acre
- Built: 1902
- Architectural style: Classical Revival
- MPS: Orleans MPS
- NRHP reference No.: 96001172
- Added to NRHP: October 18, 1996

Central Garage, originally Snyder's Tin and Hardware Shop, is a historic commercial structure located in Orleans in Jefferson County, New York. It was built in 1902. It is a two-storey, frame, rectangular building characterized by its retrained Classical Revival styling and sheet metal sheathing. It was converted from use as a shop to a garage in the 1930s.

It was listed on the National Register of Historic Places in 1996.
