= La Fargeville United Methodist Church =

Historic church in New York, United States

- U.S. National Register of Historic Places
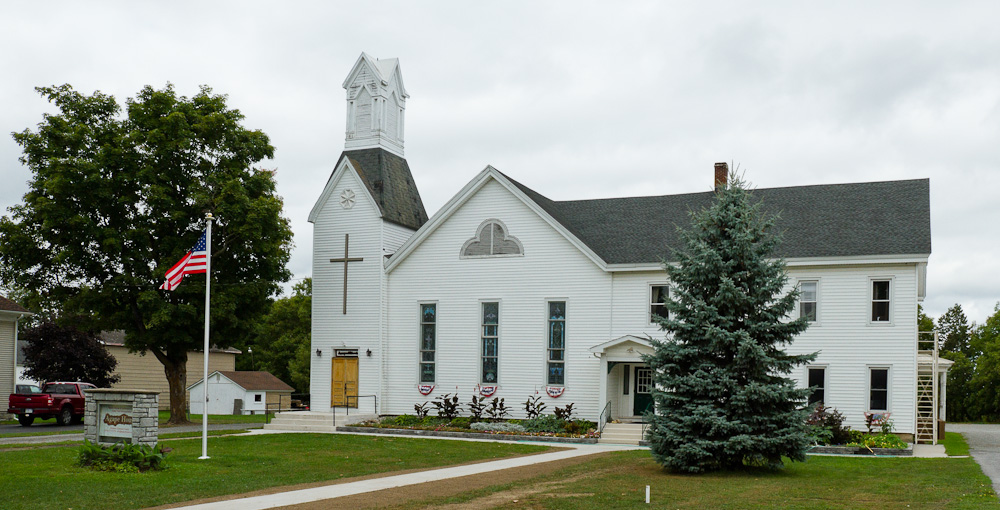

- Location within New York Location within the United States
- Location: W side of Main St., S. of jct. with Co. Rt. 181, Hamlet of La Fargeville, Orleans, New York
- Coordinates: 44°11′27″N 75°58′8″W
- Area: 1.1 acres (0.45 ha)
- Built: 1850
- Architect: UNKNOWN
- Architectural style: Italianate, Late Gothic Revival
- MPS: Orleans MPS
- NRHP reference No.: 96000670
- Added to NRHP: June 28, 1996

La Fargeville United Methodist Church is a historic United Methodist church located at Orleans in Jefferson County, New York. The three bay, gable front main section was built about 1850 in a vernacular Federal / Greek Revival style. An attached bell tower and parsonage were built in 1873. Both early structures are wood frame sheathed in clapboard. In 1892 the church was modified to the Akron plan.

It was listed on the National Register of Historic Places in 1996.
