= Brownville, New York =

- Town
- Location within New York Location within the United States
- Coordinates: 44°00′08″N 75°58′59″W
- Country: United States
- State: New York
- County: Jefferson

Government
  - Town Supervisor: Leo K. Thompson (R)
  - Town Council: Members: Kenneth G. Bates (R); Ronald T. Tepfenhart (R); Albert D. Roberts (R); Richard W. Dodge (R)

Area
  - Total: 65.85 sq mi (170.55 km^{2})
  - Land: 58.92 sq mi (152.61 km^{2})
  - Water: 6.93 sq mi (17.94 km^{2})

Population (2010)
  - Total: 6,263
  - Estimate (2016): 6,214
  - Density: 105.5/sq mi (40.72/km^{2})
- Time zone: UTC-5 (EST)
  - Summer (DST): UTC-4 (EDT)
- ZIP Codes: 13615 (Brownville); 13634 (Dexter); 13601 (Watertown); 13657 (Limerick); 13622 (Chaumont)
- Area code: 315
- FIPS code: 36-045-10242
- Website: townofbrownville.com

Brownville is a town in Jefferson County, New York, United States. The population was 6,263 at the 2010 census, up from 5,839 in 2000. The town is named after Jacob Brown, an early settler and leader.

Brownville is located in the western part of the county, northwest of Watertown. The town contains a village also named Brownville.

== History ==
The Oneida people were the original inhabitants of the area.

The town was settled around 1799 near Brownville village. It was one of the first towns in the county. Its name is derived from the founder and first settler, Jacob Brown, who was a major-general in the United States Army and is considered to be a heroic figure in the War of 1812.

The town was formed in 1802 from the town of Leyden while still part of Herkimer County.

Many of the northern towns of the county were established, or partly established, from parts of Brownville, including Le Ray (1806), Lyme (1818), Pamelia (1819), Orleans (1821), and Alexandria (1821).

In 1828, the community of Brownville set itself off from the town by incorporating as a village.

In 1855, the community of Dexter set itself off from the town by incorporating as a village.

The William Archer House, Gen. Jacob Brown Mansion, Brownville Hotel, St. Paul's Church, Vogt House, and Arthur Walrath House are listed on the National Register of Historic Places.

== Geography ==
According to the United States Census Bureau, the town has a total area of 66.4 square miles (172.1 km^{2}), of which 59.1 square miles (153.1 km^{2}) are land and 7.3 square miles (19.0 km^{2}), or 11.02%, are water.

The western border of the town is Lake Ontario and Guffin Bay, an arm of the lake, and the southern border is formed by the Black River, which flows into the lake at Black River Bay. The Perch River flows through the town from the northeastern corner to the southern border and Lake Ontario at Black River Bay.

New York State Route 12E is an east–west highway, which intersects New York State Route 180, a north-south highway, at Limerick. New York State Route 12 crosses the northeastern corner of the town.

=== Communities and locations ===
- Adams Cove – A hamlet on the north shore of Pillar Point peninsula.
- Brownville – A village in the southern part of the town on NY-12E by the Black River.
- Bull Rock Point – A projection into Lake Ontario at the western end of Pillar Point peninsula.
- Dexter – A village in the southern part of the town on NY-180, west of Brownville village. It was formerly known as "Fish Island".
- Everleigh Point – A projection into Lake Ontario at the western end of Pillar Point peninsula.
- Glen Park – A village primarily in the town, on its southern border along NY-12E.
- Guffin Bay – A bay of Lake Ontario in the northwestern part of Brownville.
- Limerick – A hamlet at the junction of Routes NY-12E and NY-180 by the Perch River, north of Dexter village.
- Natural Bridge – A location on the Perch River, southwest of Limerick.
- Perch Lake – A lake in the northeastern corner of Brownville.
- Perch River – A hamlet on NY-180 in the northern part of the town near the river of the same name. The community was once called "Moffatsville".
- Perch River State Wildlife Area – A conservation area located in the northeastern part of the town by Perch Lake.
- Pillar Point – A peninsula into Lake Ontario in the western part of the town, as well as a western projection into the lake on the end of the peninsula.
- Pillar Point Village – A hamlet on the southern coast of Pillar Point peninsula, located on County Route 59.
- Reynolds Corner – A location near the northern town line on County Road 125.

== Demographics ==
Historical population
Census	Pop.	Note	%±
1820	3,990		—
1830	2,938		−26.4%
1840	3,968		35.1%
1850	4,282		7.9%
1860	3,966		−7.4%
1870	3,219		−18.8%
1880	2,624		−18.5%
1890	3,110		18.5%
1900	3,693		18.7%
1910	3,615		−2.1%
1920	3,856		6.7%
1930	3,489		−9.5%
1940	3,671		5.2%
1950	3,806		3.7%
1960	3,985		4.7%
1970	4,321		8.4%
1980	5,113		18.3%
1990	5,604		9.6%
2000	5,839		4.2%
2010	6,263		7.3%
2016 (est.)	6,214	▼	−0.8%
U.S. Decennial Census

As of the census of 2000, there were 5,843 people, 2,184 households, and 1,633 families residing in the town. The population density was 98.5 inhabitants per square mile (38.0/km^{2}). There were 2,857 housing units at an average density of 48.2 per square mile (18.6/km^{2}). The racial makeup of the town was 97.84% White, 0.27% Black or African American, 0.55% Native American, 0.27% Asian, 0.02% Pacific Islander, 0.27% from other races, and 0.77% from two or more races. Hispanic or Latino of any race were 0.58% of the population.

There were 2,184 households, out of which 37.3% had children under the age of 18 living with them, 60.3% were married couples living together, 10.5% had a female householder with no husband present, and 25.2% were non-families. 20.5% of all households were made up of individuals, and 9.1% had someone living alone who was 65 years of age or older. The average household size was 2.66 and the average family size was 3.07.

In the town, the population was spread out, with 27.3% under the age of 18, 6.8% from 18 to 24, 29.2% from 25 to 44, 23.8% from 45 to 64, and 12.8% who were 65 years of age or older. The median age was 38 years. For every 100 females, there were 93.1 males. For every 100 females age 18 and over, there were 91.9 males.

The median income for a household in the town was $38,277, and the median income for a family was $43,866. Males had a median income of $33,889 versus $21,904 for females. The per capita income for the town was $16,303. About 6.0% of families and 8.2% of the population were below the poverty line, including 5.5% of those under age 18 and 11.3% of those age 65 or over.

== Notable people ==
- Nathan W. Brown, Paymaster-General of the U.S. Army
- Rollins A. Emerson (1873–1947), geneticist, was born in Pillar Point
- William Pryor Letchworth (May 26, 1823 – December 1, 1910) an American businessman notable for his charitable work, including his donation of his 1,000-acre estate to the State of New York which became known as Letchworth State Park, was born in Brownville.
