= Watertown Masonic Temple =

Historic place in New York, United States

- U.S. National Register of Historic Places
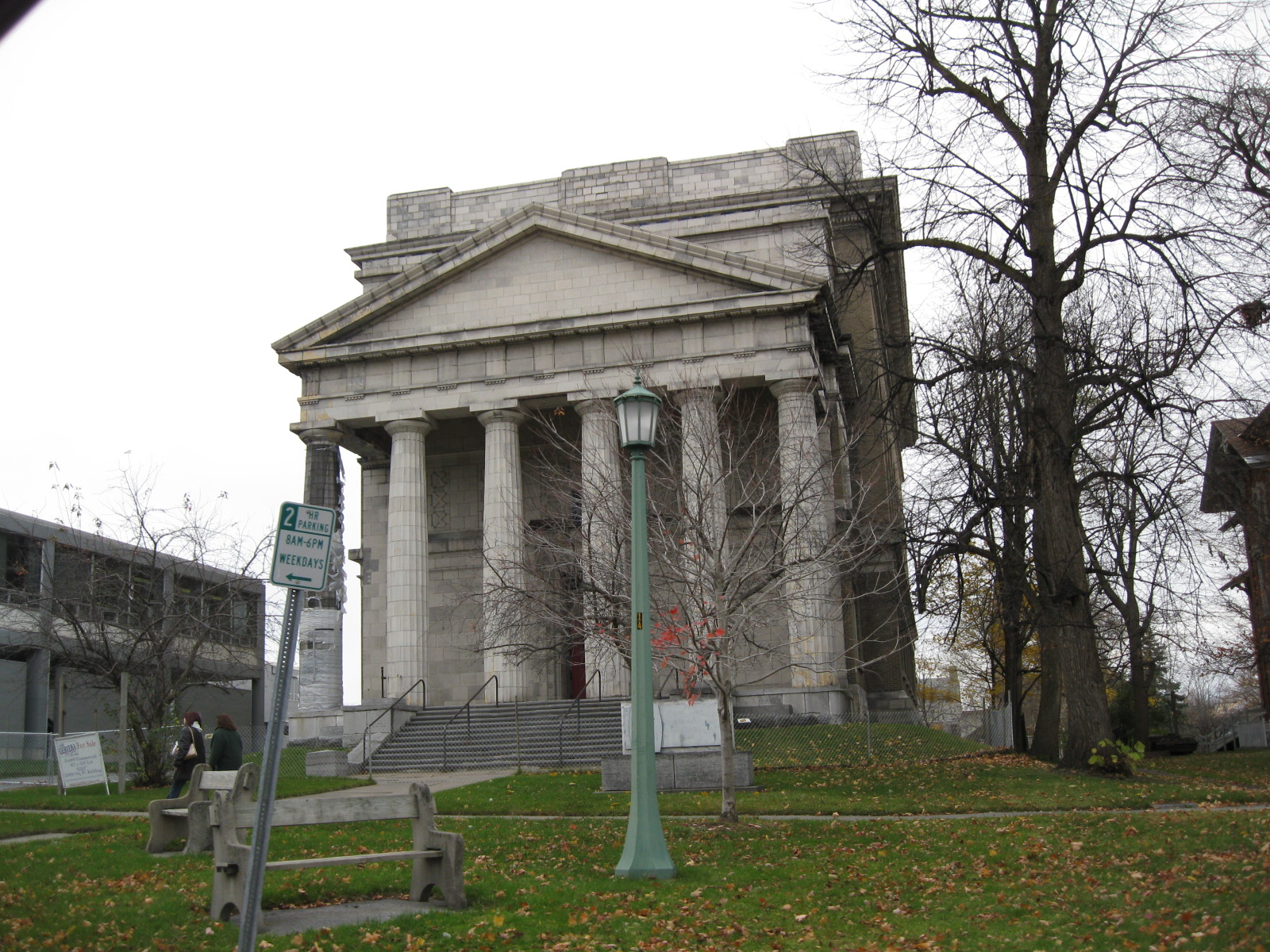
- Watertown Masonic Temple, November 2009

- Location within New York Location within the United States
- Location: 240 Washington St., Watertown, New York
- Coordinates: 43°58′23″N 75°54′42″W
- Area: less than one acre
- Built: 1914
- Architect: Dewey, Charles E.; Caswell, Fred A.
- Architectural style: Classical Revival
- NRHP reference No.: 80002629
- Added to NRHP: January 23, 1980

Watertown Masonic Temple is a historic building and former Masonic hall located in Watertown in Jefferson County, New York. It was constructed in 1914 as a meeting hall for a local Masonic lodge and is a three-story building in the Neoclassical style, with a masonry and steel structure. The front of the building features a large prostyle temple front with six Doric columns supporting a triangular pediment. It was listed on the National Register of Historic Places in 1980.

In 2003, the Masonic Hall Association decided to sell the building, citing the cost of maintaining the structure and declining membership for its decision.

In 2017, a plan to renovate the building as a performing arts center was included in a ten million dollar New York State Empire State Development Corporation revitalization grant.
