= Star Grange No. 9 =

- U.S. National Register of Historic Places
- Location within New York Location within the United States
- Location: Sulphur Springs Rd. between Jericho and Spencer Rds., Hounsfield, New York
- Coordinates: 43°55′38″N 76°1′40″W
- Area: 1.3 acres (0.53 ha)
- Built: 1931
- MPS: Hounsfield MRA
- NRHP reference No.: 89001626
- Added to NRHP: October 18, 1989

Star Grange No. 9 is a historic grange hall located at Hounsfield in Jefferson County, New York. It was built in 1931 and is a two-story, three by five bay light wood-frame building on a foundation of concrete block.

It was listed on the National Register of Historic Places in 1989.
