= Evans-Gaige-Dillenback House =

Historic house in New York, United States

- U.S. National Register of Historic Places
- Location within New York Location within the United States
- Location: Evans Rd., Lyme, New York
- Coordinates: 44°4′9″N 76°8′13″W
- Area: 2 acres (0.81 ha)
- Built: 1820
- Architectural style: Georgian, Federal
- MPS: Lyme MRA
- NRHP reference No.: 90001340
- Added to NRHP: September 06, 1990

Evans-Gaige-Dillenback House is a historic home located at Lyme in Jefferson County, New York. It was built in 1820 and consists of a 2 1/2-story three-by-four-bay main block, with a 1 1/2-story three-by-four-bay anterior wing, both of limestone in the Federal style. Attached is a 1 1/2-story, two-bay square rear wing and attached to it is a modern frame two car garage. Also on the property is a stone smoke house.

It was listed on the National Register of Historic Places in 1990.
