= St. Paul's Church (Brownville, New York) =

Historic church in New York, United States

- U.S. National Register of Historic Places
- Location within New York Location within the United States
- Location: 210 Washington St., Brownville, New York
- Coordinates: 44°0′18″N 75°58′53″W
- Area: less than one acre
- Built: 1820
- Architectural style: Federal
- MPS: Historic Churches of the Episcopal Diocese of Central New York MPS
- NRHP reference No.: 96000960
- Added to NRHP: August 30, 1996

St. Paul's Church is a historic Episcopal church located at Brownville in Jefferson County, New York. It was built in about 1820 and is a two-story, timber-framed church built of native limestone coated in stucco and exhibiting characteristics of Federal-style church architecture. It features a prominent steeple that consists of a square base and a three-stage octagonal spire.

It was listed on the National Register of Historic Places in 1996.

St. Paul's was consecrated in 1828. Its final service was November 7, 2021.
