= Hounsfield, New York =

- Town
- Location within New York Location within the United States
- Coordinates: 43°56′46″N 76°4′45″W
- Country: United States
- State: New York
- County: Jefferson

Government
  - Type: Town Council
  - Town Supervisor: Beth Arthur (R)
  - Town Council: Members' List: • John LaDuc; • Diane Nier; • Christopher Lee; • Jessica Hart

Area
  - Total: 120.42 sq mi (311.88 km^{2})
  - Land: 48.93 sq mi (126.74 km^{2})
  - Water: 71.48 sq mi (185.13 km^{2})
- Elevation: 253 ft (77 m)

Population (2010)
  - Total: 3,466
  - Density: 70.4/sq mi (27.18/km^{2})
- Time zone: UTC-5 (Eastern (EST))
  - Summer (DST): UTC-4 (EDT)
- ZIP Code: 13685 (Sackets Harbor); 13601 (Watertown); 13606 (Adams Center); 13634 (Dexter)
- Area code: 315
- FIPS code: 36-045-35782
- GNIS feature ID: 0979081
- Website: townofhounsfield.gov

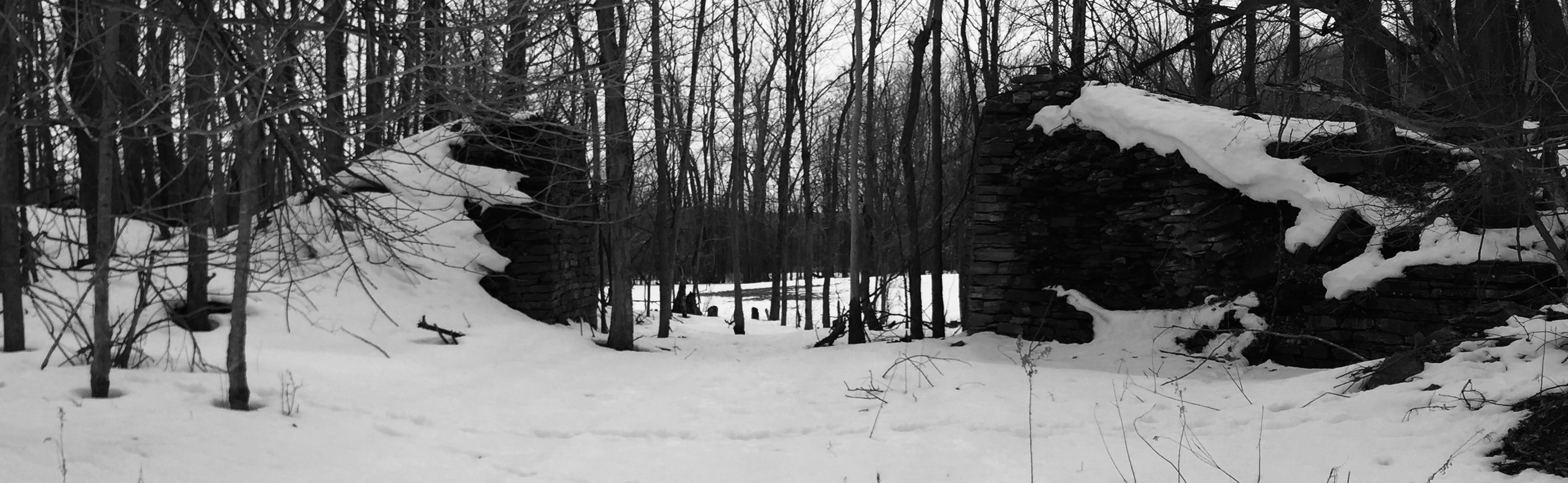
Remains of a railroad bridge near Bedford Creek in Hounsfield, New York

Hounsfield is a town in Jefferson County, New York, United States. The population was 3,466 at the 2010 census. The name of the town is from Ezra Hounsfield, a land agent and land owner. He once owned the Southern part of the township. The town was named by Augustus Sacket.

Hounsfield is in the western part of the county and is west of Watertown.

== History ==
The first settler within the town arrived around 1800.

The land comprising the town was purchased by Augustus Sackett on 20 June 1801 from a foreclosure of two prior landowners. He took an active part in developing the town and increasing its population.

Hounsfield was formed from the town of Watertown in February 17, 1806. The town and its citizens were deeply involved in the War of 1812, primarily due to the two battles that took place at Sackets Harbor.

In 1814, the community of Sackets Harbor, by Black River Bay, set itself off from the town by becoming an incorporated village.

The Bedford Creek Bridge, Conklin Farm, District School No. 19, District School No. 20, East Hounsfield Christian Church, Dr. Samuel Guthrie House, Ressequie Farm, Shore Farm, Stephen Simmons House, Star Grange No. 9, Stevenson-Frink Farm, Storrs' Harbor Naval Shipyard Site, and Sulphur Springs Cemetery are listed on the National Register of Historic Places.

== Notable people ==
- Samuel Guthrie, one of the discoverers of chloroform, and inventor of the percussion compound for firearms, which superseded flints (1782–1848). See a photo of his house in the Jewettsville section of the town here:
- Marsena R. Patrick, Union Civil War general, provost marshal of Army of Potomac (1811–1888)
- Veranus Alva Moore, bacteriologist and pathologist (1859–1931)
- William Van Waters, member of the Wisconsin State Assembly

== Geography ==
According to the United States Census Bureau, the town has a total area of 120.4 square miles (311.8 km^{2}), of which 48.9 square miles (126.7 km^{2}) are land and 71.5 square miles (185.2 km^{2}), or 59.37%, are water. The northeastern boundary is the Black River and the western boundary is Lake Ontario. Mill Creek enters Black River Bay near Sackets Harbor.

New York State Route 3 is a north-south highway in the western part of Hounsfield. Interstate 81 crosses the southeastern corner of the town.

== Demographics ==
Historical population
Census	Pop.	Note	%±
1820	3,429		—
1830	3,415		−0.4%
1840	4,146		21.4%
1850	4,136		−0.2%
1860	3,339		−19.3%
1870	2,636		−21.1%
1880	2,770		5.1%
1890	2,651		−4.3%
1900	2,772		4.6%
1910	2,217		−20.0%
1920	2,297		3.6%
1930	2,926		27.4%
1940	3,137		7.2%
1950	2,630		−16.2%
1960	2,722		3.5%
1970	2,771		1.8%
1980	2,645		−4.5%
1990	3,089		16.8%
2000	3,323		7.6%
2010	3,466		4.3%
U.S. Decennial Census

As of the census of 2000, there were 3,323 people, 1,350 households, and 908 families residing in the town. The population density was 67.5 inhabitants per square mile (26.1/km^{2}). There were 1,839 housing units at an average density of 37.3 per square mile (14.4/km^{2}). The racial makeup of the town was 97.53% White, 0.57% African American, 0.39% Native American, 0.30% Asian, 0.18% from other races, and 1.02% from two or more races. Hispanic or Latino of any race were 1.14% of the population.

There were 1,350 households, out of which 31.0% had children under the age of 18 living with them, 55.2% were married couples living together, 7.9% had a female householder with no husband present, and 32.7% were non-families. 26.7% of all households were made up of individuals, and 9.1% had someone living alone who was 65 years of age or older. The average household size was 2.45 and the average family size was 2.98.

In the town, the population was spread out, with 23.7% under the age of 18, 8.8% from 18 to 24, 33.0% from 25 to 44, 22.6% from 45 to 64, and 11.9% who were 65 years of age or older. The median age was 36 years. For every 100 females, there were 106.9 males. For every 100 females age 18 and over, there were 107.4 males.

The median income for a household in the town was $42,011, and the median income for a family was $47,742. Males had a median income of $32,464 versus $26,406 for females. The per capita income for the town was $19,806. About 7.6% of families and 10.6% of the population were below the poverty line, including 14.8% of those under age 18 and 3.6% of those age 65 or over.

== Communities and locations in the Town of Hounsfield ==
=== Communities and inhabited places ===
- Alverson – A hamlet north of Sulphur Springs.
- Baggs Corner – A hamlet on NY-3 at County Route 66, east of Sackets Harbor.
- Boulton Beach – A location southwest of Sackets Harbor on the Lake Ontario shore.
- Camps Mills – A hamlet east of Sackets Harbor on County Route 62.
- East Hounsfield – A hamlet on NY-3 near the eastern town line.
- Field's Settlement – A hamlet on County Route 63 at the eastern town line.
- Jewettville – A location on NY-3 west of Baggs Corner. It was a thriving brick-making community in the early history of Hounsfield.
- Maxon Corners – A location on County Route 63 in the southeastern part of Hounsfield.
- Paddy Hill – A location on NY-12F at the northern town line.
- Purpura Corners – A hamlet south of Sackets Harbor on NY-3.
- Sackets Harbor – A village on the south shore of Black River Bay in the central part of Hounsfield.
- Stowell Corners – A location on County Route 63 in the southeastern part of Hounsfield.
- Sulphur Springs – A hamlet on County Route 62 in the southeastern part of the town.
- Watertown International Airport (ART) – An airport in the northeastern part of the town.

=== Geographical features and other locations ===
- Bass Island – A small island offshore of the mainland in Lake Ontario.
- Black River Bay – A bay of Lake Ontario in the northern part of Hounsfield.
- Calf Island – A small island southwest of Stony Island.
- Campbell Point – A projection into Lake Ontario by the southern town line.
- Galloo Island – A large island, northwest of Stony Island, far from the mainland in Lake Ontario.
- Gull Island – A small island offshore of the mainland in Lake Ontario.
- Horse Island – A small island offshore of the mainland in Lake Ontario.
- Little Galloo Island – A small island south of Galloo Island.
- Navy Point – A point of land in Black River Bay by Sackets Harbor.
- Stony Island – A large island far from the mainland in Lake Ontario.
- Stoors Point – The end of a peninsula in the northeastern part of Black River Bay.
