= Union Hall (Chaumont, New York) =

- U.S. National Register of Historic Places
- Location within New York Location within the United States
- Location: S. Shore Rd., Lyme, New York
- Coordinates: 44°0′21″N 76°13′8″W
- Area: less than one acre
- Built: 1908
- MPS: Lyme MRA
- NRHP reference No.: 90001333
- Added to NRHP: September 6, 1990

Union Hall is a historic Grange meeting hall located in the hamlet of Point Peninsula, Lyme, Jefferson County, New York. It was built in 1908, and is a two-story, wood-frame building. It has a front gable roof and sits on a limestone foundation. At the ground floor is a commercial storefront.

It was added to the National Register of Historic Places in 1990 as one result of a study of historic resources of Lyme.
