= District School No. 20 =

- U.S. National Register of Historic Places
- Location within New York Location within the United States
- Location: NY 3, S of Co. Rd. 75, Hounsfield, New York
- Coordinates: 43°55′34″N 76°6′32″W
- Area: less than one acre
- Built: 1835
- MPS: Hounsfield MRA
- NRHP reference No.: 89001619
- Added to NRHP: October 18, 1989

District School No. 20 is a historic one-room school building located at Hounsfield in Jefferson County, New York. It is a one-story, rectangular one room structure built about 1835 of rubble Chaumont limestone. It was last used as a school in 1938.

It was listed on the National Register of Historic Places in 1989.
