= Stevenson-Frink Farm =

Historic house in New York, United States

- U.S. National Register of Historic Places
- Location within New York Location within the United States
- Location: Salt Point Rd., Hounsfield, New York
- Coordinates: 44°0′10″N 76°3′56″W
- Area: 200 acres (81 ha)
- Built: 1917
- Architect: Multiple
- Architectural style: American Four-aquare
- MPS: Hounsfield MRA
- NRHP reference No.: 89001625
- Added to NRHP: October 18, 1989

Stevenson-Frink Farm is a historic farm complex located at Hounsfield in Jefferson County, New York. The farm complex consists of the stucco-covered concrete block farmhouse built in 1917–1918, its contemporary garage and four earlier contributing agriculture related outbuildings: a stone smokehouse, a former stable/carriage barn, a cattle barn, and granary. Also on the property is a contributing house site.

It was listed on the National Register of Historic Places in 1989.
