= United Methodist Church (Chaumont, New York) =

Historic church in New York, United States

- U.S. National Register of Historic Places
- Location within New York Location within the United States
- Location: South Shore Road, Lyme, New York, U.S.
- Coordinates: 44°0′24″N 76°13′8″W
- Area: less than one acre
- Built: 1882
- MPS: Lyme MRA
- NRHP reference No.: 90001325
- Added to NRHP: September 6, 1990

United Methodist Church is a historic United Methodist church located at Lyme in Jefferson County, New York, United States. It was built in 1882 and is a one-story, four by three-bay wood-frame structure on a foundation of coursed limestone blocks. The L-shaped plan consists of the main body of the church with a perpendicular Sunday school wing and a square entrance tower. The interior reflects the influence of the Akron plan.

It was listed on the National Register of Historic Places in 1990.
