= Methodist-Protestant Church at Fisher's Landing =

Historic church in New York, United States

- U.S. National Register of Historic Places
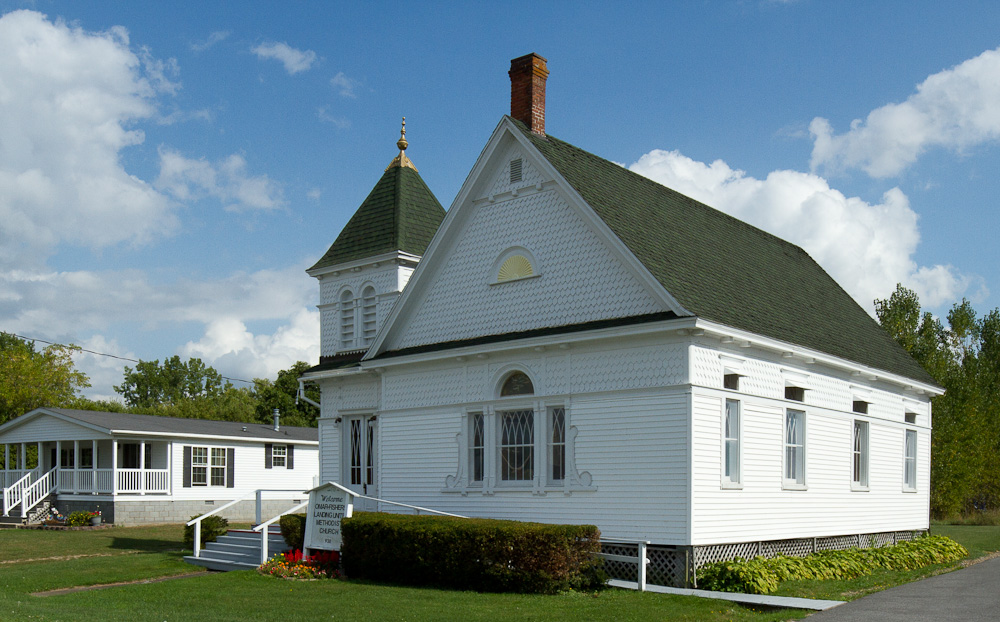

- Location within New York Location within the United States
- Location: Reed Point Rd., near jct. with Co. Rd. 195, Hamlet of Fisher's Landing, Orleans, New York
- Coordinates: 44°16′34″N 76°0′33″W
- Area: less than one acre
- Built: 1898
- Architectural style: Queen Anne
- MPS: Orleans MPS
- NRHP reference No.: 96000667
- Added to NRHP: June 28, 1996

Methodist-Protestant Church at Fisher's Landing, also known as the United Methodist Church, is a historic Methodist church located at Orleans in Jefferson County, New York. It was built in 1898 and is a wood-frame vernacular Queen Anne structure. It features carefully crafted Palladian windows with stained glass panes and wooden frame and mullions. It is a seasonally utilized church structure.

It was listed on the National Register of Historic Places in 1996.
