= John N. Rottiers Farm =

Historic house in New York, U.S.

- U.S. National Register of Historic Places
- Location within New York Location within the United States
- Location: E side of NY 180, approximately 2 mi. S of the Hamlet of Lafargeville, Orleans, New York
- Coordinates: 44°9′54″N 75°58′29″W
- Area: 229 acres (93 ha)
- Built: 1833
- Architect: Cook, Hial
- Architectural style: Federal
- MPS: Orleans MPS
- NRHP reference No.: 96001022
- Added to NRHP: September 30, 1996

John N. Rottiers Farm is a historic home and farm complex located at Orleans in Jefferson County, New York. It is a two-story, three bay limestone structure built in 1833 with two, one story stone wings with Federal detailing. Also on the property are a large dairy barn, servants' house, privy and the remains of a carriage barn.

It was listed on the National Register of Historic Places in 1996.
