= The Row (Lyme, New York) =

Historic house in New York, United States

- U.S. National Register of Historic Places
- Location within New York Location within the United States
- Location: Main St. at Shaver Creek, Three Mile Bay, Lyme, New York
- Coordinates: 44°4′49″N 76°12′18″W
- Area: 5 acres (2.0 ha)
- Built: 1845
- Architectural style: Greek Revival, Vernacular Greek Revival
- MPS: Lyme MRA
- NRHP reference No.: 90001329
- Added to NRHP: September 06, 1990

The Row is a set of historic homes located at Lyme in Jefferson County, New York. It consists of three contiguous mid-19th century vernacular Greek Revival style houses and their associated outbuildings. The houses were built between about 1845 and 1850 and each is of heavy wood-frame construction on a coursed rubble limestone foundation. The outbuildings are two privies and a carriage barn.

It was listed on the National Register of Historic Places in 1990.
