= La Farge Land Office =

Historic commercial building in New York, United States

- U.S. National Register of Historic Places
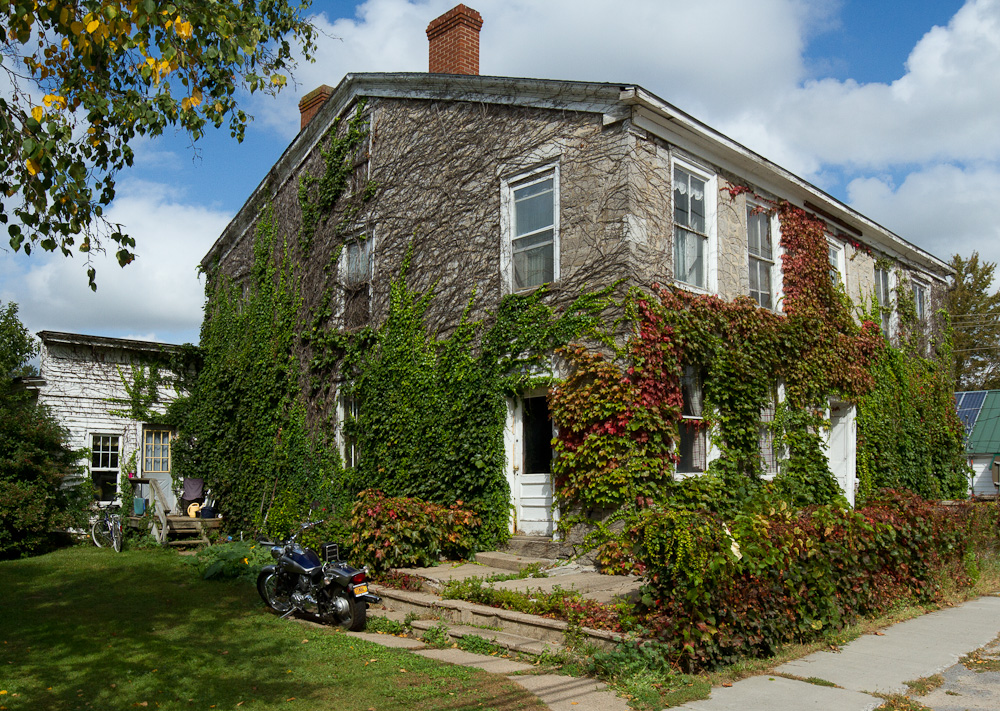

- Location within New York Location within the United States
- Location: Jct. of Main and Mill Sts., SW corner, Hamlet of La Fargeville, Orleans, New York
- Coordinates: 44°11′35″N 75°58′3″W
- Area: less than one acre
- Built: 1825
- Architectural style: Federal
- MPS: Orleans MPS
- NRHP reference No.: 96000668
- Added to NRHP: June 28, 1996

La Farge Land Office, also known as Orleans Hotel, is a historic commercial building located at Orleans in Jefferson County, New York. It was built about 1825 and is a 2-story, five-by-three-bay, side-gabled limestone building in the Federal style. A 1 1/2-story stone wing extends from the rear of the house and a 1-story wooden addition was completed in 1910. It was built by land speculator and French merchant John La Farge, as a land office, residence, and hotel. He used it until he returned to New York City in 1838.

It was listed on the National Register of Historic Places in 1996.
