= William Archer House =

Historic house in New York, United States

- U.S. National Register of Historic Places
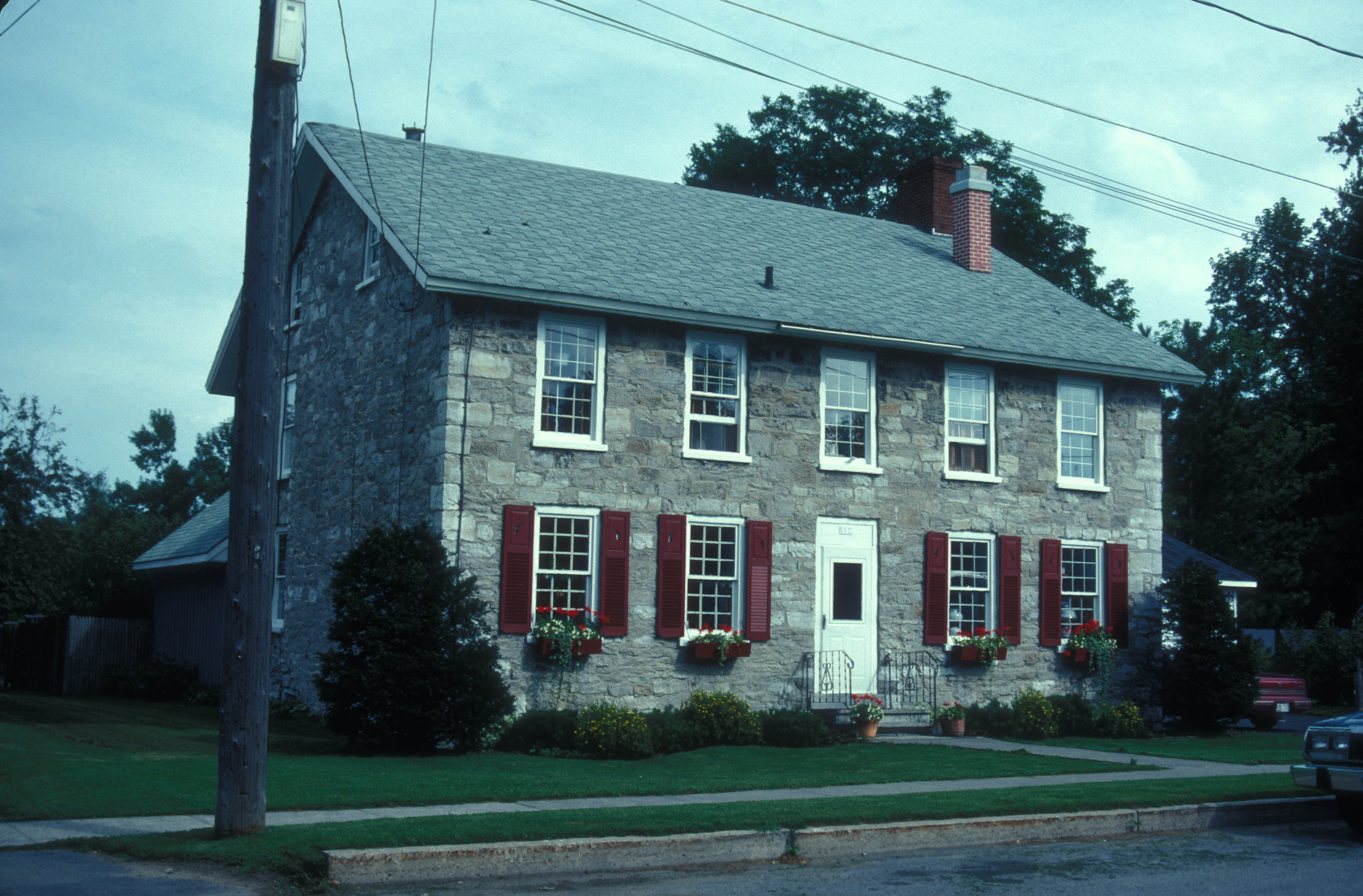
- William Archer House, September 1970

- Location within New York Location within the United States
- Location: 112 Washington St., Brownville, New York
- Coordinates: 44°0′11″N 75°58′56″W
- Area: 0.8 acres (0.32 ha)
- Built: ca. 1811
- MPS: Stone Houses of Brownville TR
- NRHP reference No.: 80002623
- Added to NRHP: November 19, 1980

William Archer House is a historic home located at Brownville in Jefferson County, New York. It is a stone house built about 1811.

It was listed on the National Register of Historic Places in 1980.
