= Vogt House (Brownville, New York) =

Historic house in New York, United States

- U.S. National Register of Historic Places
- Location within New York Location within the United States
- Location: 110 Main St., Brownville, New York
- Coordinates: 44°0′8″N 75°58′52″W
- Area: 2.3 acres (0.93 ha)
- Built: ca. 1826
- Architectural style: Federal
- MPS: Stone Houses of Brownville TR
- NRHP reference No.: 80002626
- Added to NRHP: November 19, 1980

Vogt House is a historic home located at Brownville in Jefferson County, New York. It is a stone house built about 1826 in the Federal style.

It was listed on the National Register of Historic Places in 1980.
