= District School No. 3 (Chaumont, New York) =

- U.S. National Register of Historic Places
- Location within New York Location within the United States
- Location: Junction of NY 3 and County Rd. 57, Putnam Corners, Lyme, New York
- Coordinates: 44°4′9″N 76°14′18″W
- Area: less than one acre
- Built: 1875
- MPS: Lyme MRA
- NRHP reference No.: 90001326
- Added to NRHP: September 6, 1990

District School No. 3, also known as Putnam Schoolhouse, is a historic one-room school building located at Lyme in Jefferson County, New York. The schoolhouse consists of a 1 1/2-story, two-by-three-bay wood-frame main block constructed about 1875, and a 1-story, two-by-one-bay rear addition constructed about 1900. Also on the property is a double privy dating to about 1900.

It was listed on the National Register of Historic Places in 1990. Olita C Stewart was a teacher in the One Room School until Chaumont Central School started, then worked there.
