= East Hounsfield Christian Church =

Historic church in New York, United States

- U.S. National Register of Historic Places
- Location within New York Location within the United States
- Location: NY 3, Hounsfield, New York
- Coordinates: 43°58′8″N 75°59′33″W
- Area: less than one acre
- Built: ca. 1844
- Architectural style: Greek Revival
- MPS: Hounsfield MRA
- NRHP reference No.: 89001621
- Added to NRHP: October 18, 1989

East Hounsfield Christian Church is a historic church located at Hounsfield in Jefferson County, New York, United States. It was built about 1844 and is a two-story, three bay wide and three bay deep, gable front frame structure with Greek Revival features. A one-story wood frame wing is attached to the rear by a small hyphen. The front features a two-stage wood belfry.

It was listed on the National Register of Historic Places in 1989.
