= Sulphur Springs Cemetery =

Historic cemetery in New York, United States

- U.S. National Register of Historic Places
- Location within New York Location within the United States
- Location: Co. Rd. 62, SW of Spencer Rd., Hounsfield, New York
- Coordinates: 43°55′27″N 76°1′54″W
- Area: 2.3 acres (0.93 ha)
- Architect: Cincinnati Iron Fence Co.
- MPS: Hounsfield MRA
- NRHP reference No.: 89001620
- Added to NRHP: October 18, 1989

Sulphur Springs Cemetery is a historic rural cemetery located at Hounsfield in Jefferson County, New York. It is a cemetery that includes both the original burial ground dating to about 1800 and the much larger "romantic landscape" expansion dating to about 1879. The earliest extant stones date from 1812.

It was listed in the National Register of Historic Places in 1989.
