= Point Salubrious Historic District =

Historic district in New York, United States

- U.S. National Register of Historic Places
- U.S. Historic district
- Location within New York Location within the United States
- Location: Point Salubrious Rd., Lyme, New York
- Coordinates: 44°2′34″N 76°9′20″W
- Area: 6 acres (2.4 ha)
- Built: 1892
- Architectural style: Bungalow/Craftsman, Queen Anne
- MPS: Lyme MRA
- NRHP reference No.: 90001339
- Added to NRHP: September 06, 1990

Point Salubrious Historic District is a national historic district located at Lyme near Chaumont in Jefferson County, New York. The district includes 11 contributing buildings and four contributing structures. It includes a farmhouse, a boarding house, five seasonal bungalows, five associated outbuildings (one non-contributing), one remnant shed, and six pumphouse structures (two non-contributing).

It was listed on the National Register of Historic Places in 1990.
