= Conklin Farm =

Historic house in New York, United States

- U.S. National Register of Historic Places
- Location within New York Location within the United States
- Location: Evans Rd., Hounsfield, New York
- Coordinates: 43°59′2″N 75°59′29″W
- Area: 194 acres (79 ha)
- Built: 1905
- Architect: Gladwyn, William
- MPS: Hounsfield MRA
- NRHP reference No.: 89001624
- Added to NRHP: October 18, 1989

Conklin Farm is a historic farm complex located at Hounsfield in Jefferson County, New York. The farm complex consists of a 2 1/2-story gable-front double-farmhouse, horse barn, milk house, and garage. Also on the property are the ruins of a cow barn with attached silo and the ruins of a chicken coop.

It was listed on the National Register of Historic Places in 1989.
