= Shelburne Village Historic District =

Historic district in Vermont, United States

- U.S. National Register of Historic Places
- U.S. Historic district
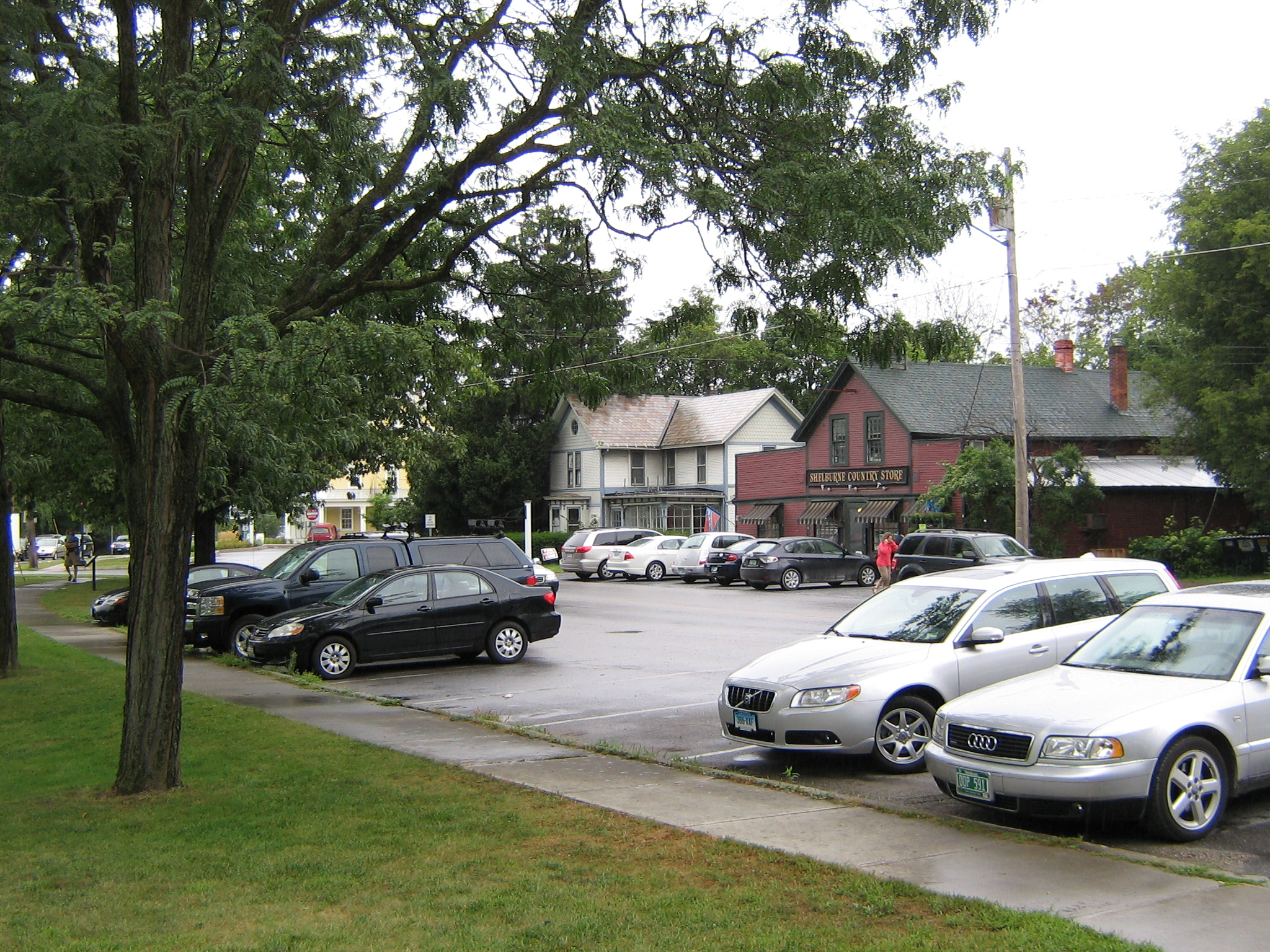
- Downtown Shelburne village

- Location within Vermont Location within the United States
- Location: Area N and S of jct. of US 7, Harbor Rd. and Falls Rd., including area S and E of La Platte R. and US 7, Shelburne, Vermont
- Coordinates: 44°22′51″N 73°13′36″W
- Area: 74 acres (30 ha)
- Architectural style: Late 19th And 20th Century Revivals, Queen Anne, Vernacular domestic
- NRHP reference No.: 90001055
- Added to NRHP: July 27, 1990

The Shelburne Village Historic District encompasses the central portion of the main village of Shelburne, Vermont. Centered on the junction of United States Route 7 with Harbor and Falls Roads, the district's architecture traces the town's history from the 18th to early 20th century. It was listed on the National Register of Historic Places in 1990.

== Description and history ==
The town of Shelburne was chartered in 1763, and first surveyed by Ira Allen. Early settlers fled the area during the American Revolutionary War, and permanent settlement resumed in the 1780s. Benjamin Harrington, an early settler, owned and farmed the land where the village is located. He laid out the stagecoach route between Rutland and Burlington (now roughly US 7) in the 1790s, and built the Shelburne Inn. The community remained agricultural until the advent of the railroad in 1849, with its center of industry a mile to the southeast at Shelburne Falls. The village's greatest period of development was between about 1880 and 1910, when industry developed near the railroad, and the town benefited from the philanthropy of the Shelburne Museum's founders, William Seward Webb and Electra Havemeyer Webb.

The historic district is centered at the junction of US 7 with Harbor Road and Falls Road. It extends north to the LaPlatte River, and south beyond Church Street. It includes properties on Church Street and Falls Road, and on Harbor Road just beyond the railroad tracks. It abuts the property of the Shelburne Museum to the southwest. It is about 74 acres (30 ha) in size, and includes how many historic buildings. The oldest surviving building in the district is the 1796 Shelburne Inn, and Federal style houses are scattered throughout the village. Prominent and defining features of the village are three churches, all of stone or brick construction. Most of the other buildings are wood-frame structures, one to 2 1/2 stories in height, although there are a few brick buildings.

== See also ==
- National Register of Historic Places listings in Chittenden County, Vermont
