= Taylor Boathouse =

- U.S. National Register of Historic Places
- Location within New York Location within the United States
- Location: Bay View Dr., Three Mile Bay, Lyme, New York
- Coordinates: 44°4′46″N 76°12′2″W
- Area: less than one acre
- Built: 1905
- Architectural style: Colonial Revival, Bungalow/Craftsman, Shingle Style
- MPS: Lyme MRA
- NRHP reference No.: 90001330
- Added to NRHP: September 6, 1990

Taylor Boathouse is a historic boathouse located at Lyme in Jefferson County, New York, constructed about 1905.

It is a two-story, two by four bay wood-frame building resting on a concrete base, which forms a walkway around three sides of the building. On the second story are spacious servants' quarters.

It was listed on the National Register of Historic Places in 1990.
