= Grenadier Island Schoolhouse =

- U.S. National Register of Historic Places
- New York State Register of Historic Places
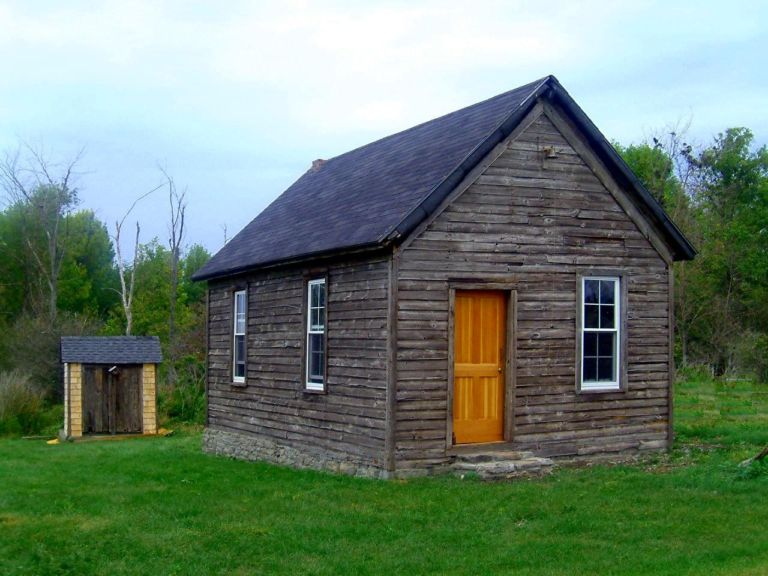
- Grenadier Island Schoolhouse, March 2007

- Location within New York Location within the United States
- Location: Grenadier Island Rd. 3, on Grenadier Island, Cape Vincent, New York
- Coordinates: 44°02′53″N 76°21′15″W
- Area: Less than 1 acre (0.40 ha)
- Built: c. 1879
- NRHP reference No.: 12000955
- NYSRHP No.: 04505.000191

Significant dates
- Added to NRHP: November 21, 2012
- Designated NYSRHP: September 26, 2012

Grenadier Island Schoolhouse, also known as School No. 16, is a historic one-room school building located on Grenadier Island, Cape Vincent, Jefferson County, New York. It was built about 1879, and is a one-story, two bay by two bay, frame building on a limestone foundation. The building includes a small entrance vestibule and open main classroom space. Also on the property is a contributing original outhouse. It operated until 1942.

It was added to the National Register of Historic Places in 2012.
