= Old Stone Shop =

Historic commercial building in New York, United States

- U.S. National Register of Historic Places
- Location within New York Location within the United States
- Location: Main St., Three Mile Bay, Lyme, New York
- Coordinates: 44°4′56″N 76°11′50″W
- Area: less than one acre
- Built: 1838
- MPS: Lyme MRA
- NRHP reference No.: 90001328
- Added to NRHP: September 6, 1990

Old Stone Shop is a historic commercial building located at Lyme in Jefferson County, New York. It was built in 1838–1839 and is a 1 1/2-story, four-by-two-bay gable-ended building with foundation and walls of coursed quarry-dressed limestone, trimmed in dressed limestone. It was built as a double blacksmith shop and exhibits the finest commercial masonry architecture in the town of Lyme.

It was listed on the National Register of Historic Places in 1990.
