= Arthur Walrath House =

Historic house in New York, United States

- U.S. National Register of Historic Places
- Location within New York Location within the United States
- Location: 114 Corner Pike, Brownville, New York
- Coordinates: 44°0′11″N 75°58′55″W
- Area: 7.6 acres (3.1 ha)
- Built: ca. 1811
- MPS: Stone Houses of Brownville TR
- NRHP reference No.: 80002627
- Added to NRHP: November 19, 1980

Arthur Walrath House is a historic home located at Brownville in Jefferson County, New York. It is a stone house built about 1811.

It was listed on the National Register of Historic Places in 1980.
