= Tracy Farm =

Historic house in New York, United States

- U.S. National Register of Historic Places
- Location within New York Location within the United States
- Location: E. side of Wilder Rd., S of jct. with Overbluff Rd., Orleans, New York
- Coordinates: 44°9′9″N 75°59′56″W
- Area: 1.2 acres (0.49 ha)
- Built: 1860
- MPS: Orleans MPS
- NRHP reference No.: 97000066
- Added to NRHP: February 14, 1997

Tracy Farm is an historic home and farm complex located at Orleans in Jefferson County, New York. The farmhouse was built about 1890 on an existing limestone foundation. The main 2-story part of the house is an L-shaped block with a 1 1/2-story kitchen ell extending off the rear elevation. The property also includes an original late-19th-century horse and buggy barn, cow barn, wooden silo, the original farmhouse dating to 1860, and the remains of an iron windmill and pump.

It was listed on the National Register of Historic Places in 1997.
