= Three Mile Bay, New York =

- Census-designated place
- Location within New York Location within the United States
- Coordinates: 44°4′53″N 76°11′54″W
- Country: United States
- State: New York
- County: Jefferson
- Town: Lyme

Area
  - Total: 0.30 sq mi (0.77 km^{2})
  - Land: 0.28 sq mi (0.73 km^{2})
  - Water: 0.012 sq mi (0.03 km^{2})
- Elevation: 259 ft (79 m)

Population (2020)
  - Total: 187
  - Density: 661.0/sq mi (255.23/km^{2})
- Time zone: UTC-5 (Eastern (EST))
  - Summer (DST): UTC-4 (EDT)
- ZIP Codes: 13693 (Three Mile Bay); 13622 (Chaumont)
- Area code: 315
- GNIS feature ID: 967455
- FIPS code: 36-73737

Three Mile Bay is a hamlet and census-designated place (CDP) in the town of Lyme in Jefferson County, New York, United States. The elevation is 259 feet (79 m). As of the 2020 census, Three Mile Bay had a population of 187.

The hamlet has its own post office, a volunteer fire company, and boat launches for fishing and recreation in the various outlying bays that draw from Lake Ontario and the St. Lawrence seaway.

== History ==
The community was settled between 1810 and 1820. Early resident Asa Wilcox built 48 brigs, propellers, schooners, and other seafaring vessels from 1835 to 1853. Some of these vessels, like the A.E. Vickery, ultimately joined the more than 500 shipwrecked vessels now resting at the bottom of the St. Lawrence River and Lake Ontario.

== Geography ==
Three Mile Bay is in western Jefferson County, at the head of a bay of the same name, an inlet to Chaumont Bay of Lake Ontario. The community is in the western part of the town of Lyme along New York State Route 12E, which leads northwest 8 miles (13 km) to Cape Vincent on the St. Lawrence River and southeast 17 miles (27 km) to Watertown, the Jefferson county seat.

According to the U.S. Census Bureau, the Three Mile Bay CDP has an area of 0.26 square miles (0.67 km^{2}), all land.

== Demographics ==
Historical population
Census	Pop.	Note	%±
2020	187		—
U.S. Decennial Census

== Education ==
The school district is the Lyme Central School District.
