= Stephen Simmons House =

Historic house in New York, United States

- U.S. National Register of Historic Places
- Location within New York Location within the United States
- Location: Camps Mills Rd., W of Old Slat Points Rd., Hounsfield, New York
- Coordinates: 43°56′7″N 76°4′28″W
- Area: less than one acre
- Built: 1818
- MPS: Hounsfield MRA
- NRHP reference No.: 89001615
- Added to NRHP: October 18, 1989

Stephen Simmons House is a historic home located at Hounsfield in Jefferson County, New York. The farmhouse was built about 1818 and consists of a 2 1/2-story main block and an original 1-story rear wing, with a modern 1-story wood-frame garage attached to the wing. The walls are of roughly dressed local ashlar limestone laid in even courses and trimmed with smoothly dressed limestone.

It was listed on the National Register of Historic Places in 1989.
