= Emerson House =

Emerson House may refer to:

- Ralph Waldo Emerson House, Concord, Massachusetts, listed on the NRHP in Massachusetts
- Emerson House (Haverhill, Massachusetts), listed on the National Register of Historic Places in Essex County, Massachusetts
- Emerson House (Methuen, Massachusetts), listed on the National Register of Historic Places in Essex County, Massachusetts
- Capt. Oliver Emerson Homestead, Methuen, Massachusetts, listed on the NRHP in Massachusetts
- Emerson-Franklin Poole House, Wakefield, Massachusetts, listed on the NRHP in Massachusetts
- Emerson Place, Watertown, New York, listed on the NRHP in Jefferson County, New York
- Ezekiel Emerson Farm, Rochester, Vermont, listed on the National Register of Historic Places in Windsor County, Vermont
- Emerson Hall, Beloit, Wisconsin, listed on the National Register of Historic Places listings in Rock County, Wisconsin
