= Emma Flower Taylor Mansion =

Historic house in New York, United States

- U.S. National Register of Historic Places
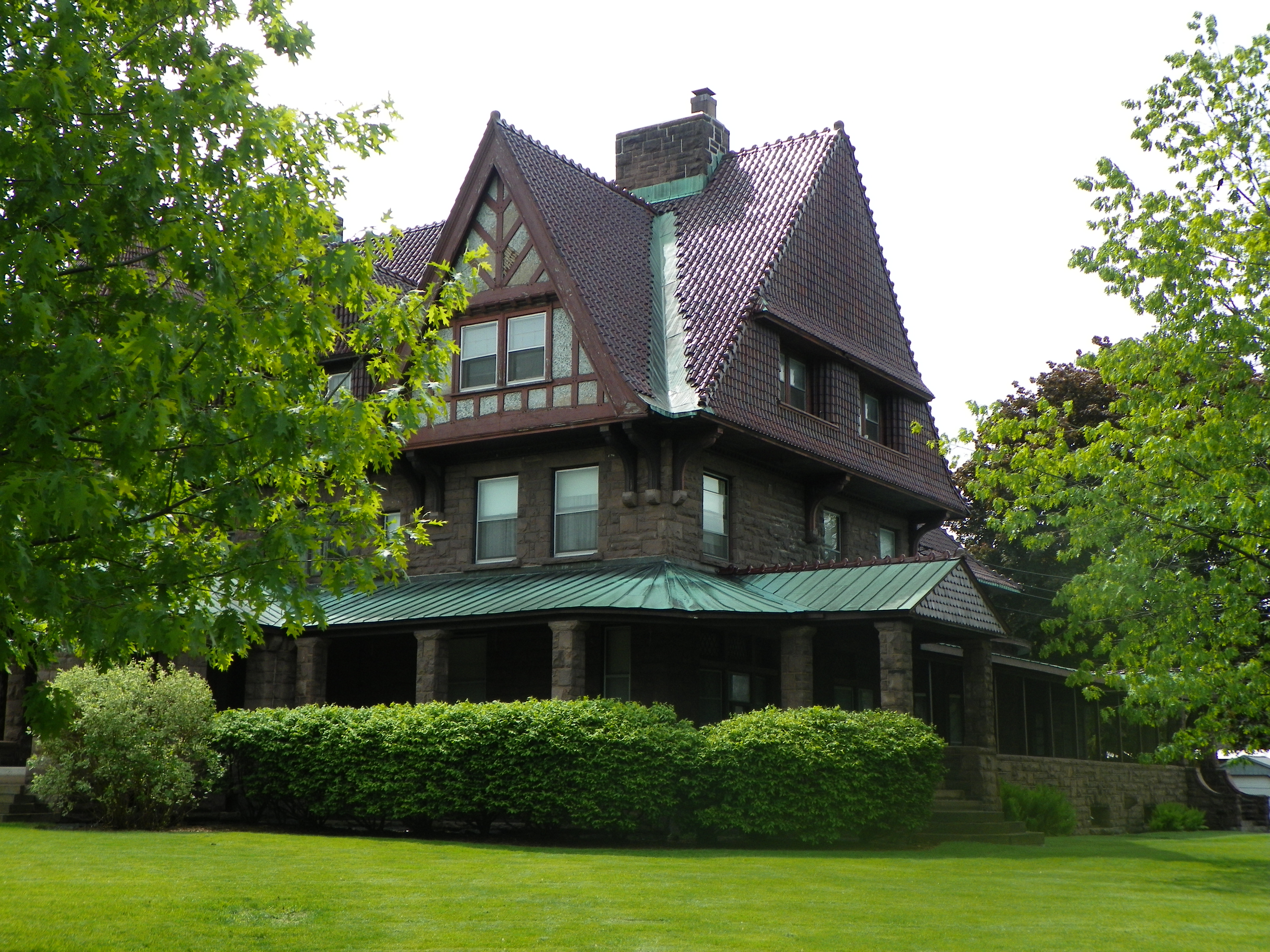
- Emma Flower Taylor Mansion Watertown New York

- Location within New York Location within the United States
- Location: 241 Clinton St., Watertown, New York
- Coordinates: 43°58′20″N 75°55′4″W
- Area: 1.2 acres (0.49 ha)
- Built: 1896
- Architect: Rich, Charles Alonzo; Phillips, Patrick
- Architectural style: Queen Anne
- NRHP reference No.: 02001114
- Added to NRHP: October 10, 2002

Emma Flower Taylor Mansion is a historic home located at Watertown in Jefferson County, New York. It was built in 1896–1897 and is a massive 2 1/2-story mansion constructed of rock faced, random course Medina sandstone which was hand-cut on site. The footprint is 5,628 square feet (522.9 m^{2}), not including the porches and porte cochere. It is Queen Anne in style and features wraparound porches, towers, projecting bays, dormers, and a complex roofline. It was constructed as a wedding gift to his daughter by New York Governor Roswell Pettibone Flower.

It was listed on the National Register of Historic Places in 2002.

== Gallery ==
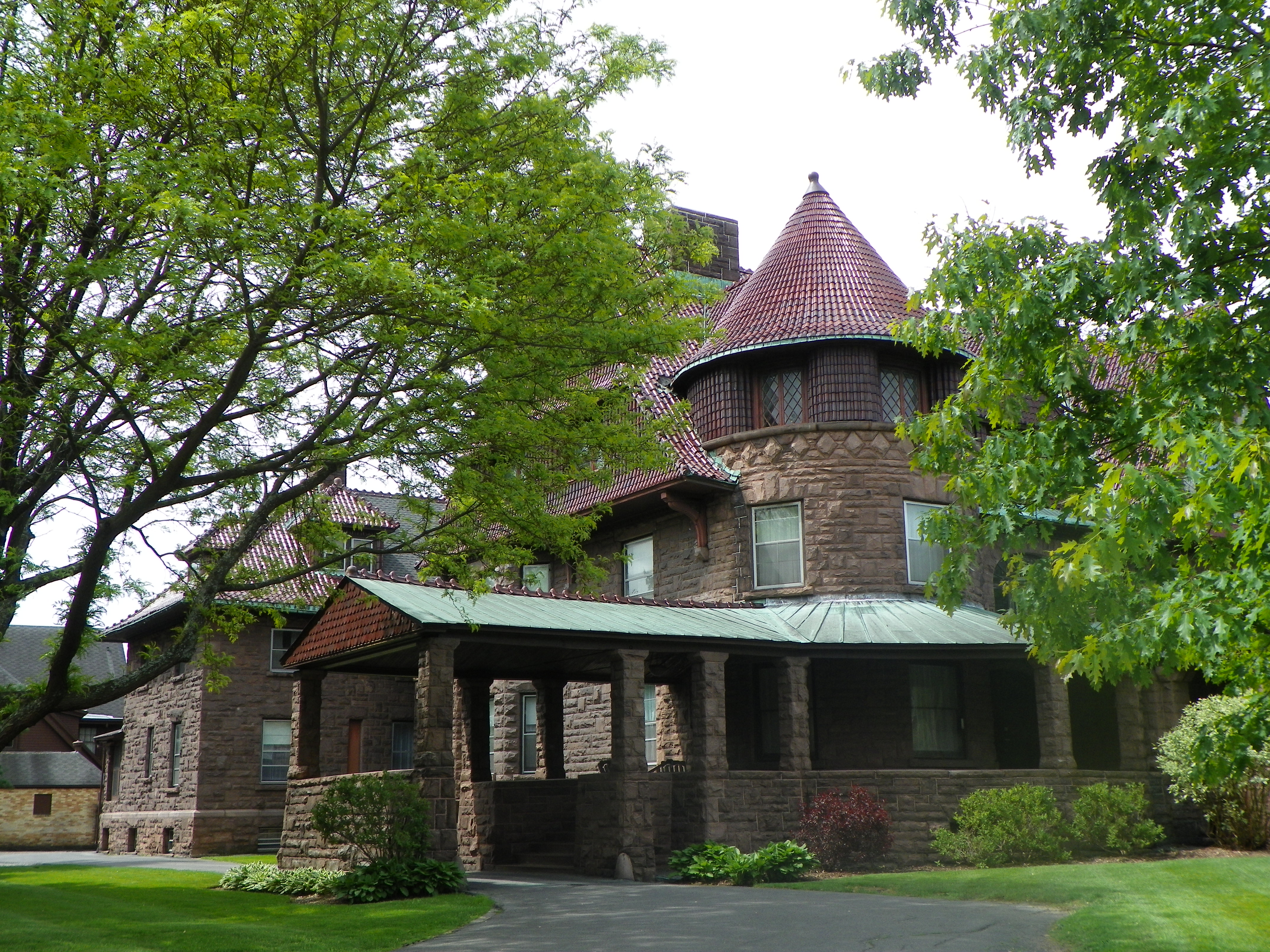
Port Cochere

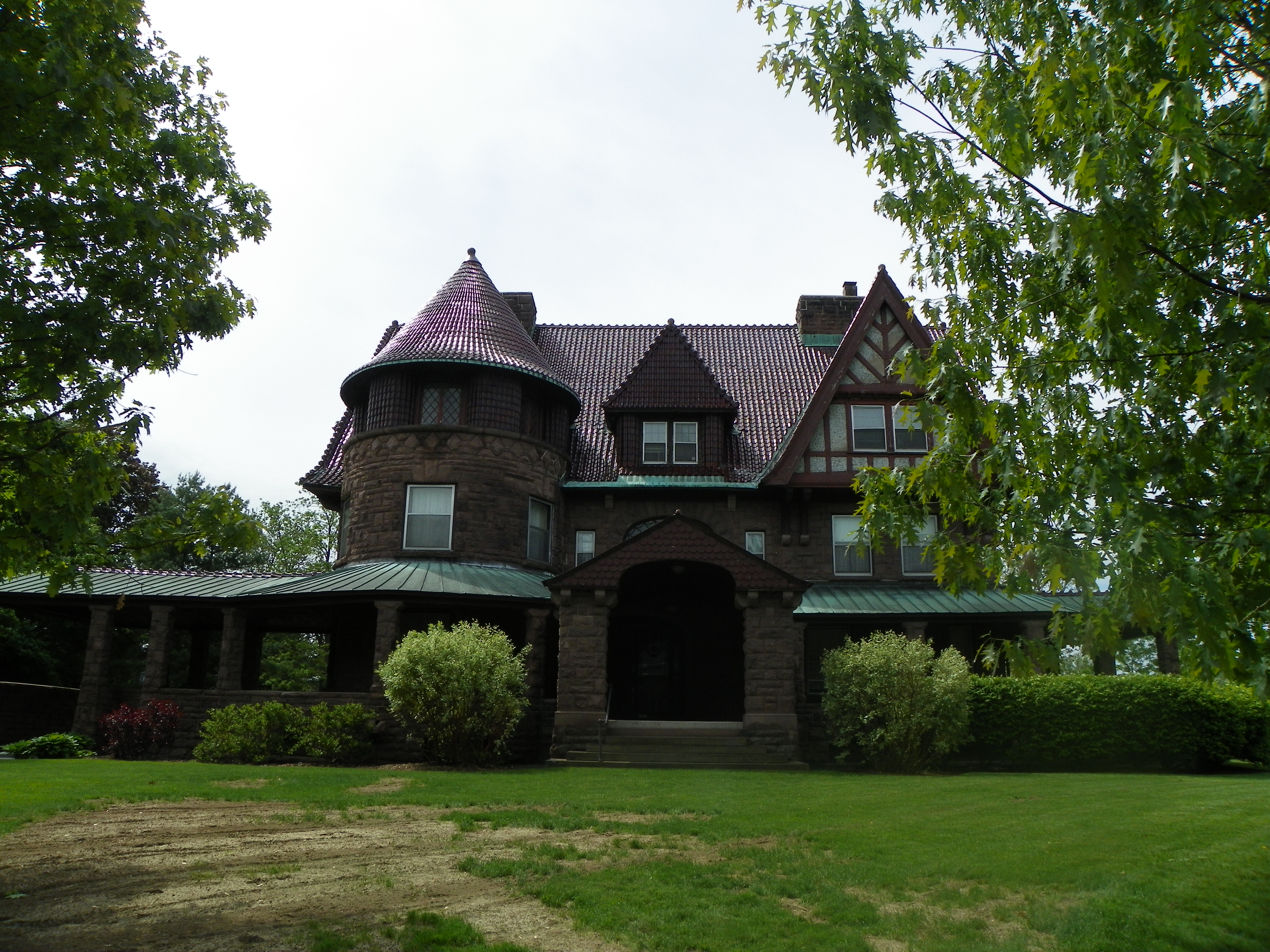
Front
