= Jefferson County Courthouse Complex =

- U.S. National Register of Historic Places
- U.S. Historic district
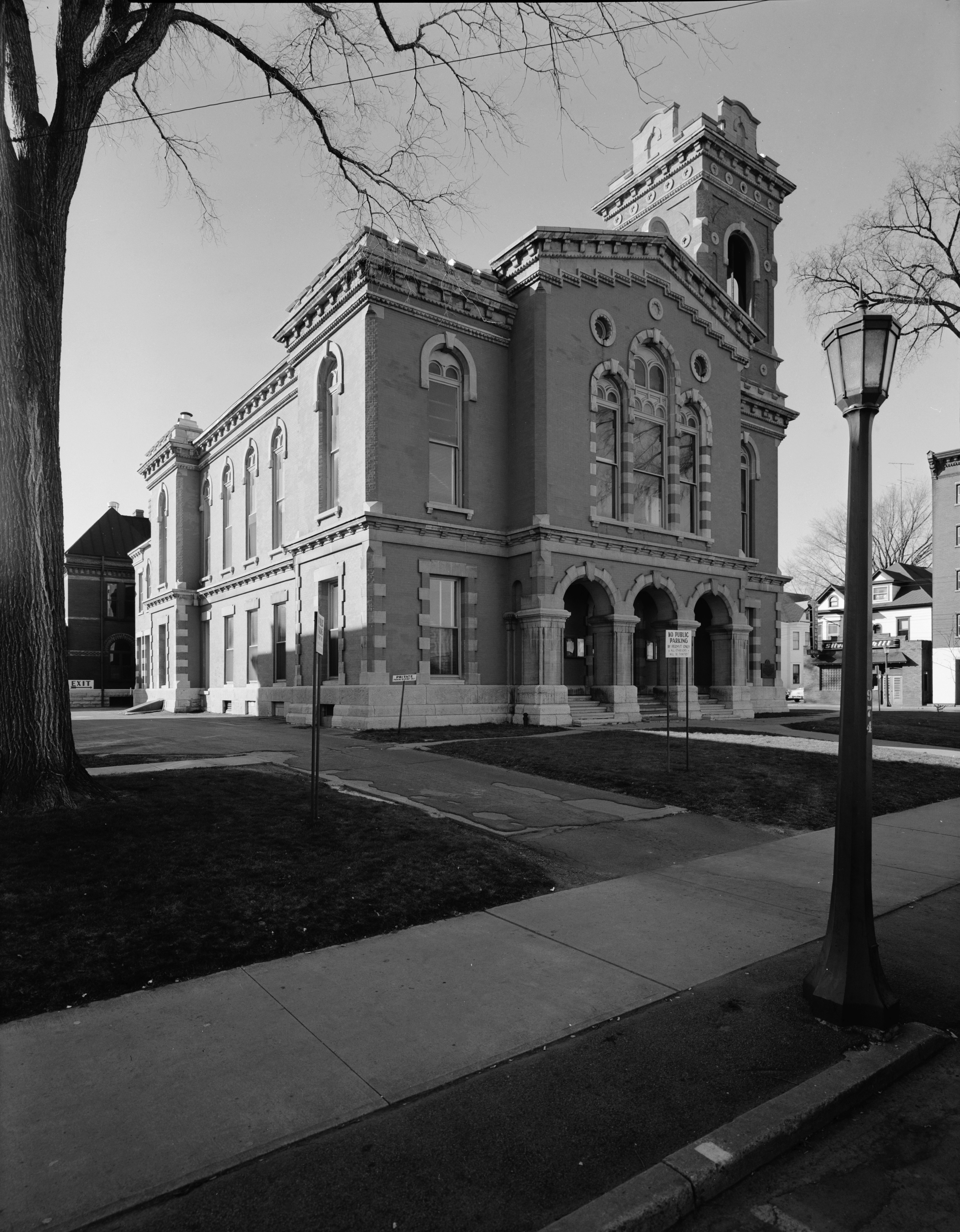
- Old Jefferson County Courthouse, October 1966

- Location within New York Location within the United States
- Interactive map showing the location for Jefferson County Courthouse Complex
- Location: SE corner of Arsenal and Sherman Sts., Watertown, New York
- Coordinates: 43°58′31″N 75°54′51″W
- Area: 2 acres (0.81 ha)
- Built: 1862
- Architect: White, Horatio Nelson; Kieff & Hose
- NRHP reference No.: 74001248
- Added to NRHP: June 07, 1974

Jefferson County Courthouse Complex is a courthouse complex and national historic district located at Watertown in Jefferson County, New York. The district includes three contributing buildings; the courthouse building (1862), Clerk's Office (1883–1884) and Surrogate's Office (1905). The courthouse building is a two-story, red brick structure with limestone trim. It features a three-story tower on the northwest corner. It was designed by architect Horatio Nelson White.

It was listed on the National Register of Historic Places in 1974.

== Gallery ==
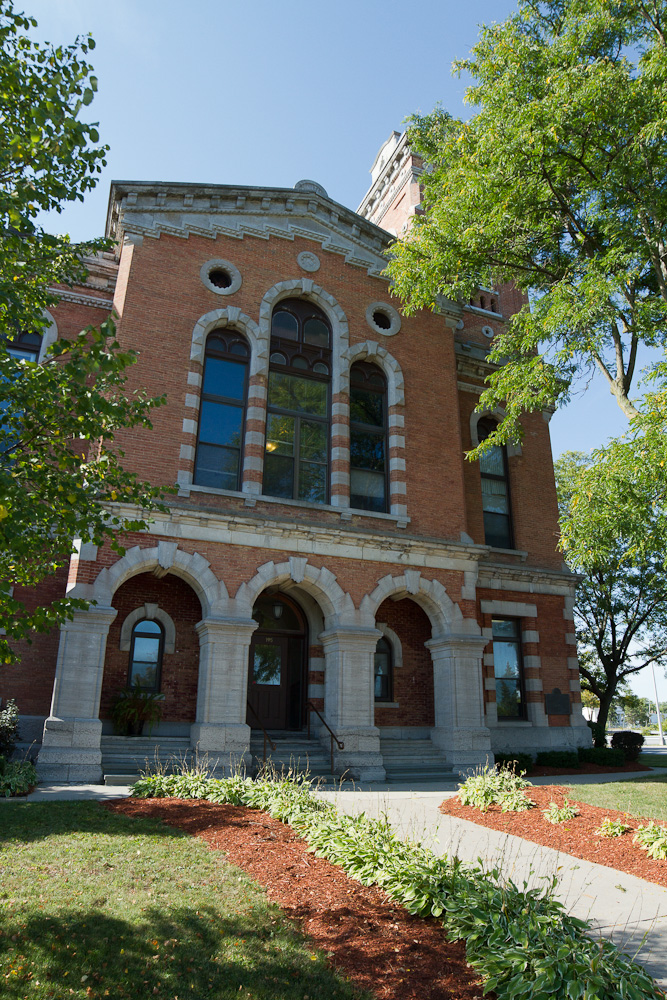
Jefferson County Courthouse Complex

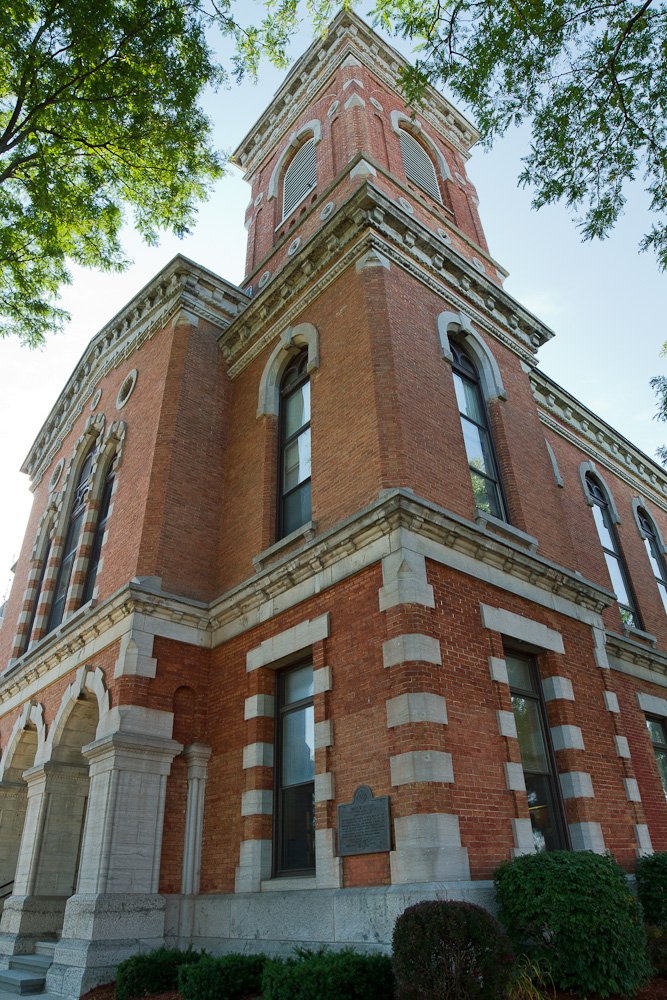
Jefferson County Courthouse Complex
