= Paddock Mansion =

Historic house in New York, United States

- U.S. National Register of Historic Places
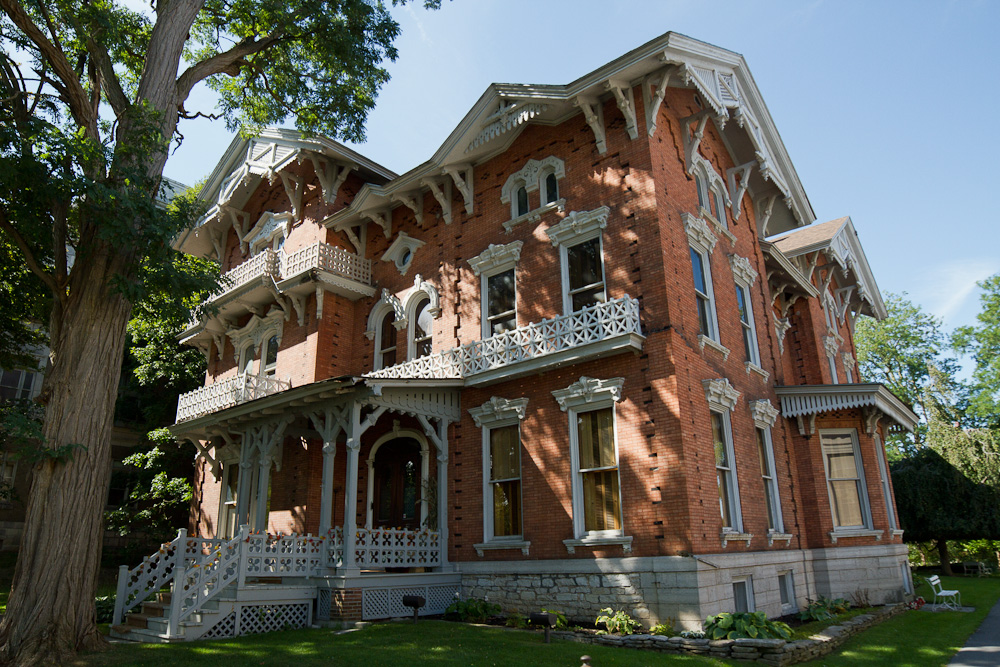
- Paddock Mansion, 2018

- Location within New York Location within the United States
- Location: 228 Washington St., Watertown, New York
- Coordinates: 43°58′23″N 75°54′43″W
- Area: 1 acre (0.40 ha)
- Built: 1876
- Architect: Hose, John
- Architectural style: Stick/Eastlake
- NRHP reference No.: 79001587
- Added to NRHP: December 11, 1979

Paddock Mansion is a historic home located at Watertown in Jefferson County, New York. Since 1922, it has been the headquarters of the Jefferson County Historical Society. It was built in 1876 and is a 2 1/2-story brick structure on a high basement in the Stick / Eastlake style. It features a 3-story tower on the southeast corner and the eaves, gables, balconies, and front porch are supported by elaborate turned millwork and chamfered brackets and posts.

It was listed on the National Register of Historic Places in 1979.
