= Watertown International Airport =

Airport in Watertown, New York

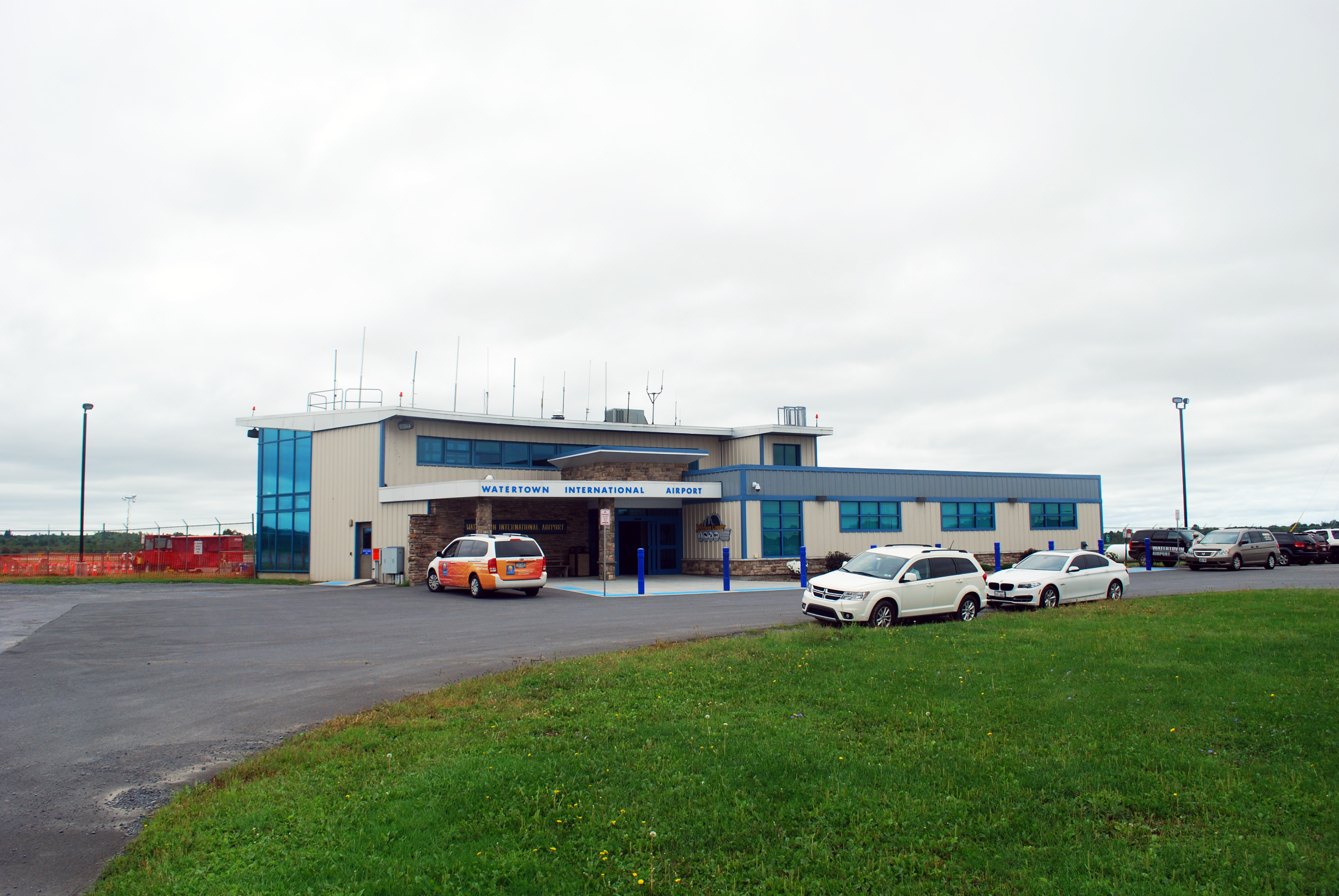
- IATA: ART; ICAO: KART; FAA LID: ART

Summary
- Airport type: Public
- Owner: County of Jefferson
- Serves: Watertown, New York
- Location: Hounsfield, New York
- Elevation AMSL: 331 ft (101 m)
- Coordinates: 43°59′31″N 076°01′14″W
- Website: watertownairport.com

Maps
- FAA airport diagram
- Interactive map of Watertown International Airport

Runways
Direction	Length		Surface
Direction	ft	m	Surface
10/28	7,001	2,134	Asphalt
07/25	4,999	1,524	Asphalt

Statistics (12 months ending September 2022 ^{except where noted})
- Passenger volume: 42,920
- Departing passengers: 21,200
- Scheduled flights: 621
- Aircraft operations (2021): 49,786
- Based aircraft (2022): 35
- Source: Federal Aviation Administration, BTS

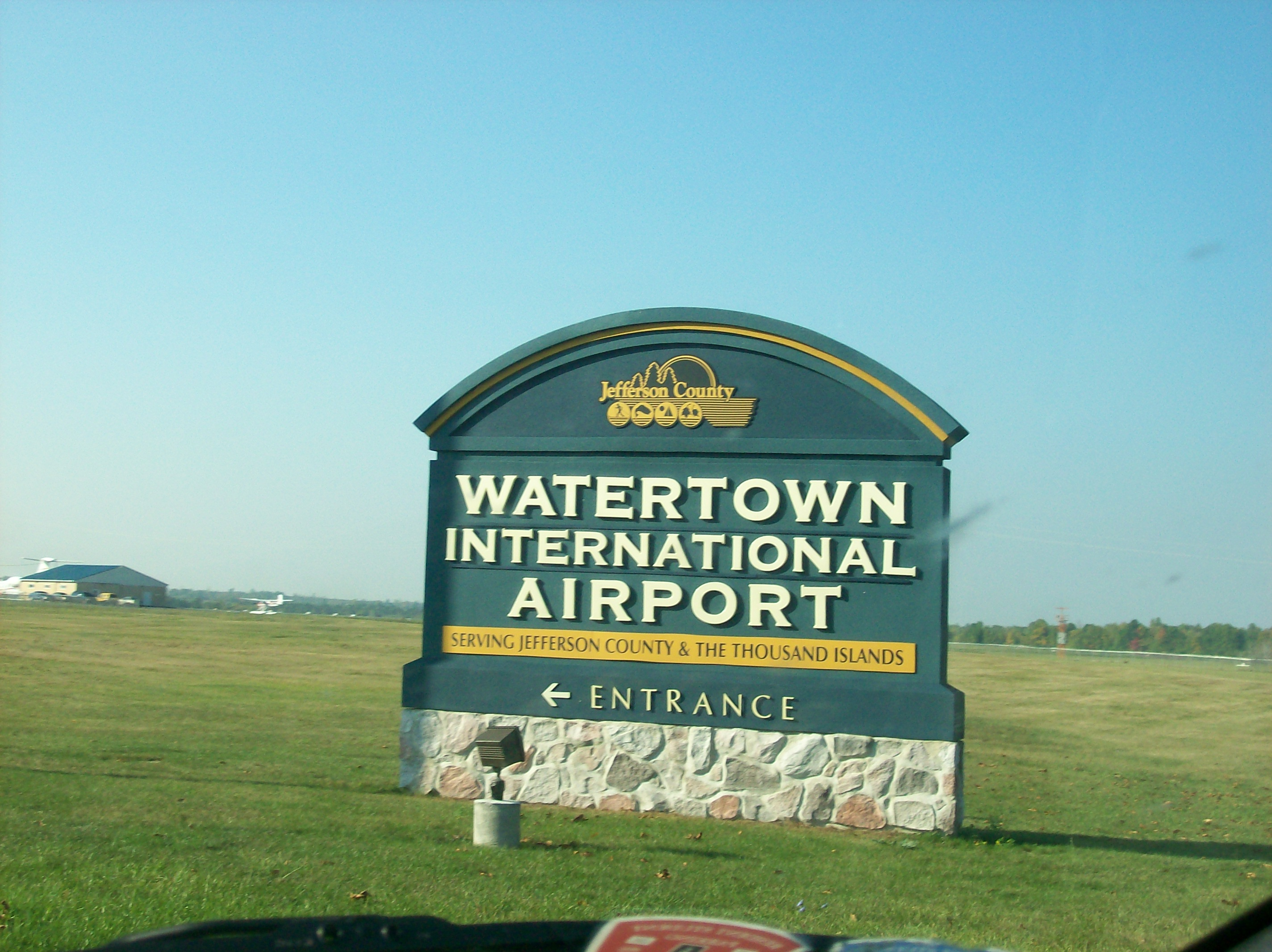
Sign at the entrance to the airport

Watertown International Airport (IATA: ART, ICAO: KART, FAA LID: ART) is in the Town of Hounsfield in Jefferson County, New York, United States, 6 mi (5.2 nmi; 9.7 km) west of Watertown. The airport is used for general aviation, but has scheduled passenger service subsidized by the Essential Air Service program. The airport has no scheduled international passenger flights, but is available as an international port of entry for private aircraft on two hours' advance notice from pilots.

The Federal Aviation Administration says this airport had 2,203 passenger boardings (enplanements) in calendar year 2010, 4,449 in 2011, and 16,988 in 2012. It is included in the Federal Aviation Administration (FAA) National Plan of Integrated Airport Systems for 2023–2027, in which it is categorized as a non-hub primary commercial service facility.

On July 12, 2024, a Boeing C-17 Globemaster III from the 732nd Airlift Squadron landed at Watertown International Airport and stayed for two days before leaving.

As of April 5, 2025, the airport was undergoing a series of construction projects to add a new jet bridge, terminal, and baggage claim.

== History ==
The city of Watertown bought the land in 1927 and the Airport was opened in 1929.

== Facilities ==
The airport covers 1,100 acres (450 ha) at an elevation of 331 feet (101 m).

It has two asphalt runways:

- Runway 10/28 is 7,001 ft × 150 ft (2,134 m × 46 m)
- Runway 7/25 is 4,999 ft × 150 ft (1,524 m × 46 m)

Runway 10/28 was extended from 5,000 ft (1,500 m) length to 5,999 ft (1,828 m) as an interim extension and was lengthened again to 7,001 ft (2.134 km) opening to that length in July 2016. The airport has an instrument landing system and a medium-intensity approach lighting system with runway alignment indicator lights on the shorter runway 7.

In the 12-month period ending June 30, 2022, the airport had 49,786 aircraft operations, average 136 per day: 66% general aviation, 29% military, 3% airline, and 2% air taxi. In December 2022, 35 aircraft were based at this airport: 24 single-engine, 8 multi-engine, 1 jet, and 2 helicopter.

== Airport development ==
Watertown International Airport's first scheduled jet service is operated by American Eagle Airlines, which flies 44-passenger Embraer ERJ 145 regional jets. Service was initially planned to begin in June 2011; however, an environmental impact assessment had to be completed prior to flights commencing. Additionally, renovation work of baggage systems and passenger waiting areas was necessary to accommodate the new service, which cost nearly one million dollars. Service began November 17, 2011.

Climate data for Watertown International Airport, New York (96.9 m (318 ft) AMSL), 1991–2020 normals, extremes 1949–present
Month	Jan	Feb	Mar	Apr	May	Jun	Jul	Aug	Sep	Oct	Nov	Dec	Year
Record high °F (°C)	66 (19)	66 (19)	84 (29)	89 (32)	91 (33)	95 (35)	97 (36)	96 (36)	96 (36)	84 (29)	77 (25)	69 (21)	97 (36)
Mean daily maximum °F (°C)	29.8 (−1.2)	31.4 (−0.3)	40.0 (4.4)	53.7 (12.1)	66.2 (19.0)	74.5 (23.6)	79.2 (26.2)	78.2 (25.7)	71.2 (21.8)	58.4 (14.7)	46.6 (8.1)	35.5 (1.9)	55.4 (13.0)
Daily mean °F (°C)	19.9 (−6.7)	21.1 (−6.1)	30.4 (−0.9)	43.1 (6.2)	55.0 (12.8)	63.8 (17.7)	69.0 (20.6)	67.5 (19.7)	60.0 (15.6)	48.8 (9.3)	38.0 (3.3)	27.3 (−2.6)	45.3 (7.4)
Mean daily minimum °F (°C)	10.0 (−12.2)	10.7 (−11.8)	20.7 (−6.3)	32.5 (0.3)	43.7 (6.5)	53.1 (11.7)	58.8 (14.9)	56.7 (13.7)	48.8 (9.3)	39.2 (4.0)	29.5 (−1.4)	19.0 (−7.2)	35.2 (1.8)
Record low °F (°C)	−43 (−42)	−37 (−38)	−24 (−31)	6 (−14)	18 (−8)	29 (−2)	33 (1)	30 (−1)	22 (−6)	12 (−11)	−7 (−22)	−37 (−38)	−43 (−42)
Average precipitation inches (mm)	2.86 (73)	2.18 (55)	2.37 (60)	3.07 (78)	2.97 (75)	3.09 (78)	3.01 (76)	3.20 (81)	3.56 (90)	4.22 (107)	3.40 (86)	3.14 (80)	37.07 (942)
Average snowfall inches (cm)	31.6 (80)	20.7 (53)	12.0 (30)	2.8 (7.1)	0.1 (0.25)	0.0 (0.0)	0.0 (0.0)	0.0 (0.0)	0.0 (0.0)	0.2 (0.51)	7.0 (18)	25.8 (66)	100.2 (255)
Average precipitation days (≥ 0.01 in)	16.4	13.7	12.5	13.0	13.0	12.3	10.6	10.5	10.8	14.4	14.4	16.3	157.9
Average snowy days (≥ 0.1 in)	13.7	10.4	7.0	2.4	0.1	0.0	0.0	0.0	0.1	0.4	4.5	12.0	50.6
Source: NOAA (snow 1981–2010)

== Airline and destination ==
The following airline offers scheduled passenger service:

Airlines	Destinations	Refs
American Eagle	Philadelphia	

=== Statistics ===
Carrier shares (July 2024 – June 2025)
Carrier	Passengers (arriving and departing)
Piedmont	51,660(100%)

Busiest domestic routes from ART (November 2024 – October 2025)
Rank	City	Passengers	Carriers
1	Philadelphia, Pennsylvania	25,650	American

Passenger boardings (enplanements) by year, as per the FAA
Year	Enplanements	Change
2005	4,612	▲24%
2006	3,672	▼20%
2007	7,471	▲103%
2008	524	▼93%
2009	2,145	▲309%
2010	2,203	▲3%
2011	4,449	▲102%
2012	16,988	▲282%
2013	18,818	▲11%
2014	19,307	▲3%
2015	18,650	▼3%
2016	17,302	▼7%
2017	22,785	▲32%
2018	23,689	▲5%
2019	22,466	▼5%
2020	11,563	▼49%
2021	19,823	▲71%
2022	20,243	▲2%
2023	21,434	▲6%
2024	23,146	▲8%

== See also ==
- List of airports in New York
