= Watertown, New York =

City in New York, United States

Watertown
- City
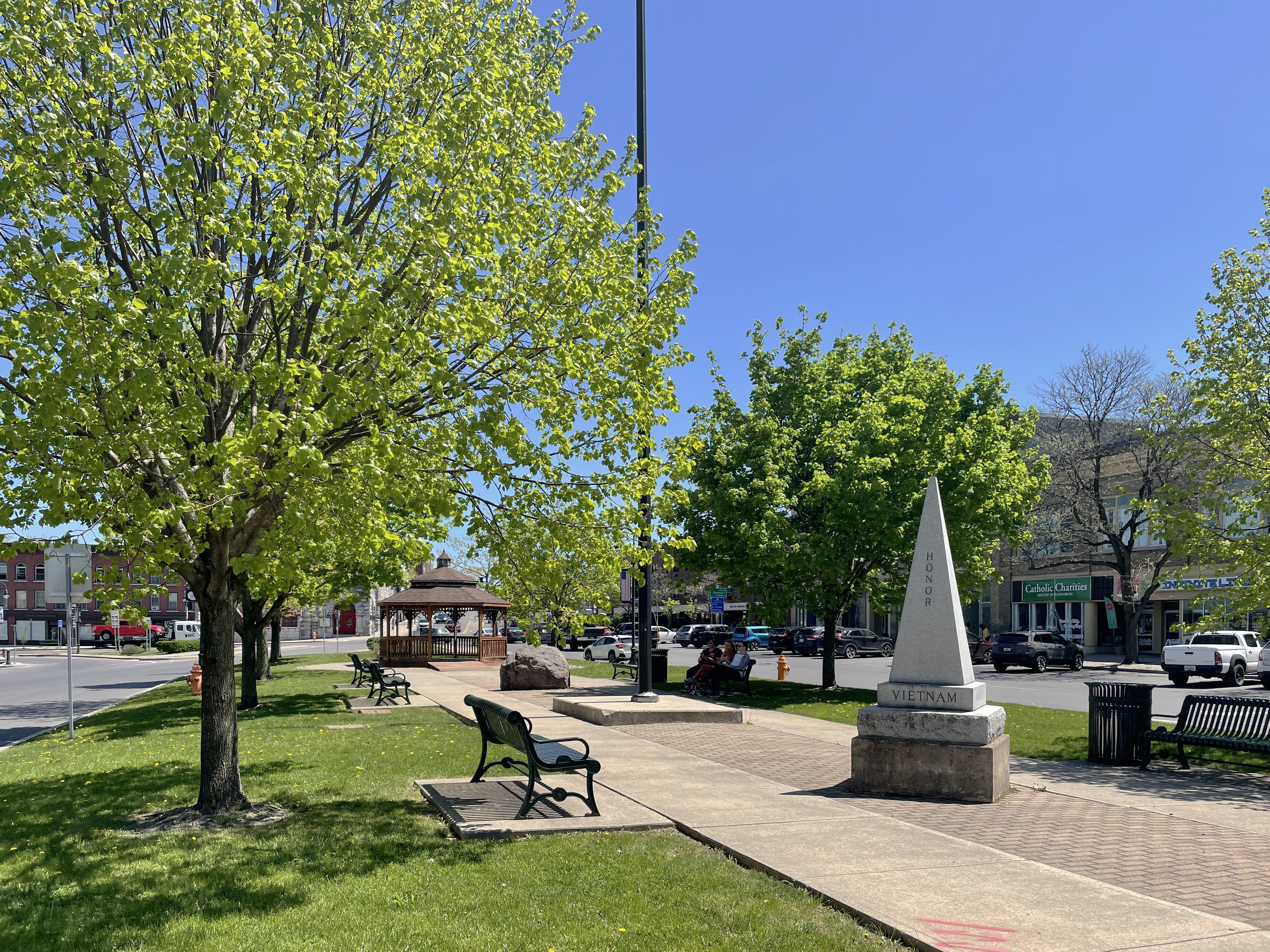
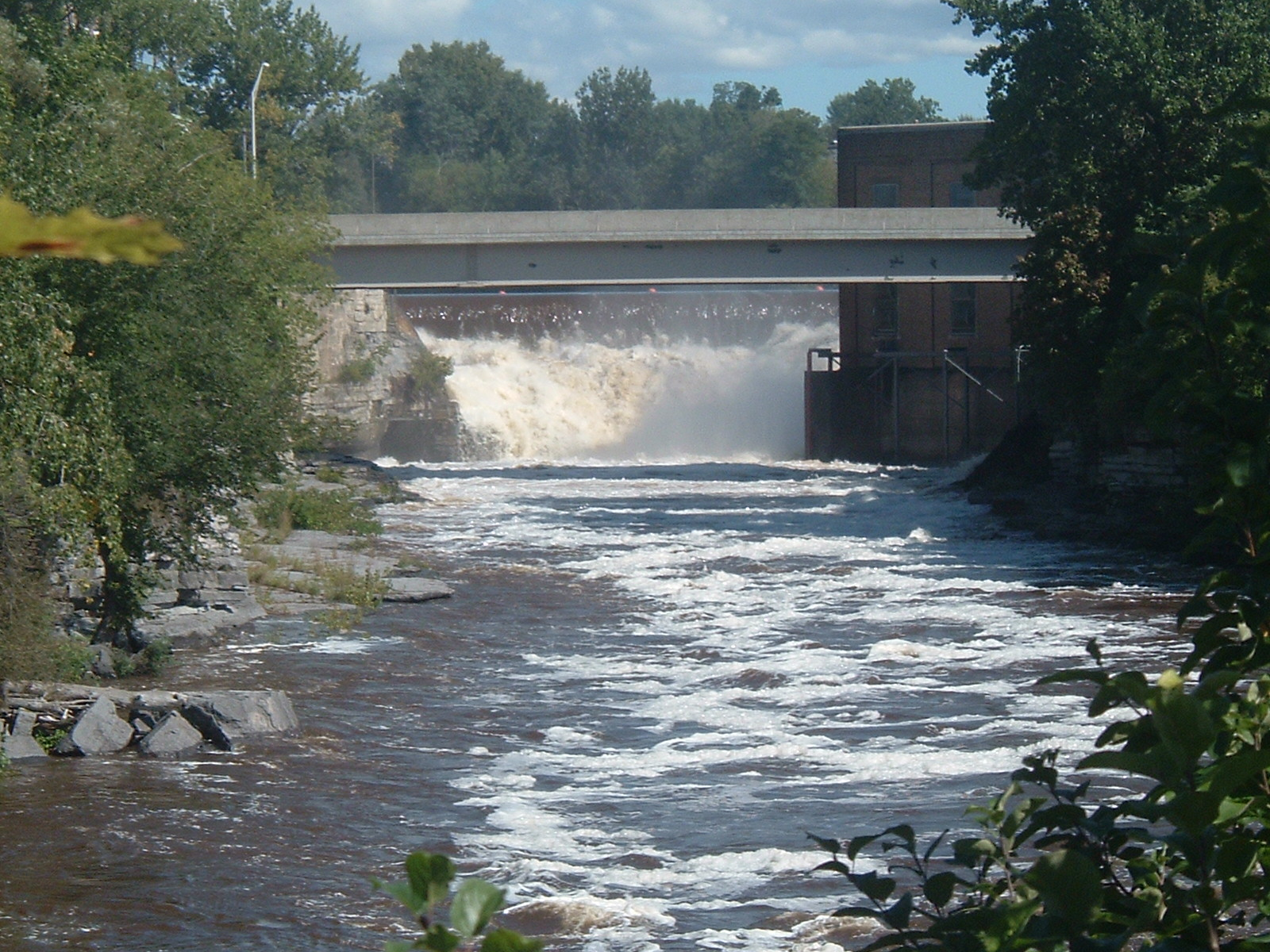
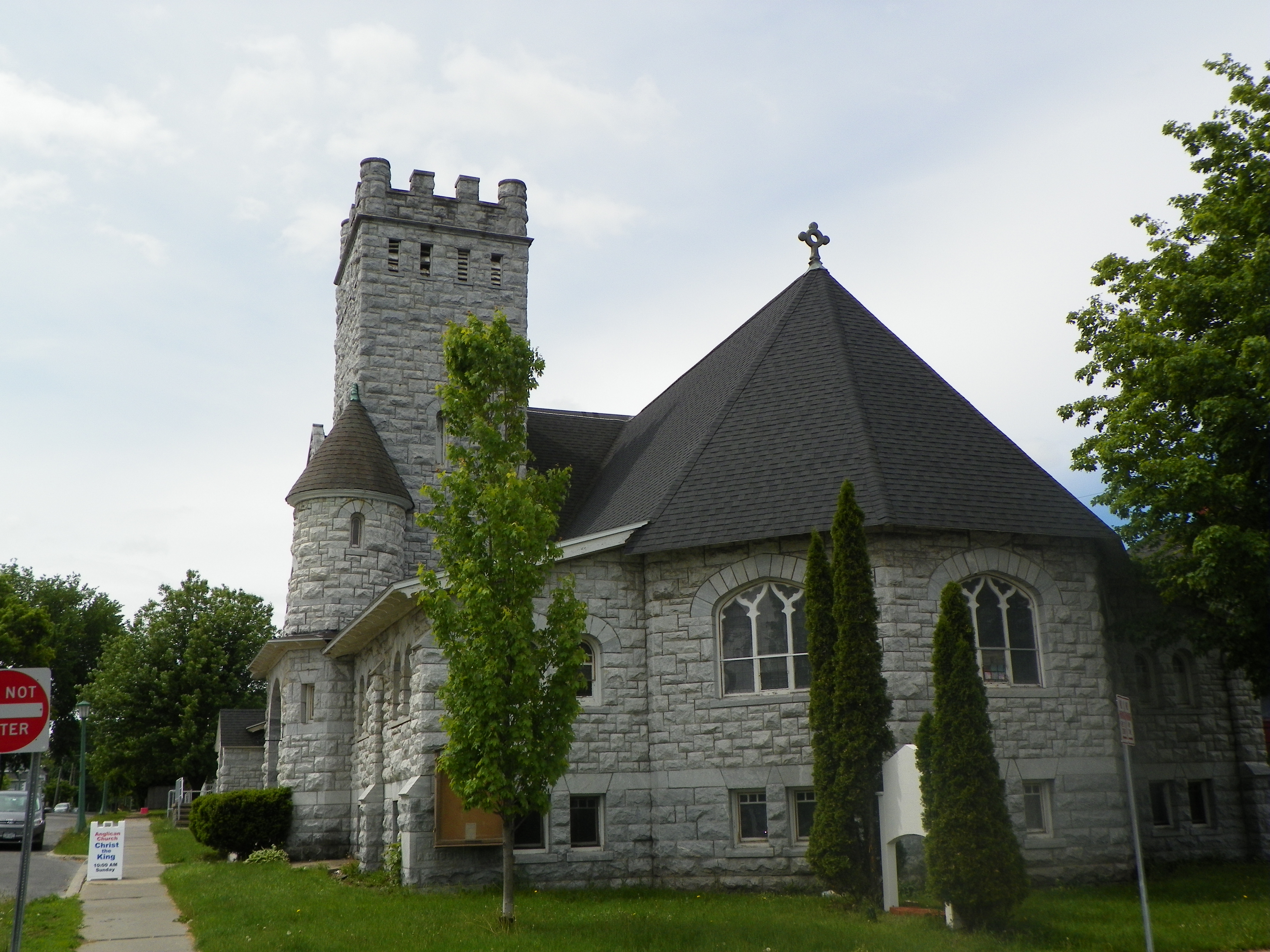
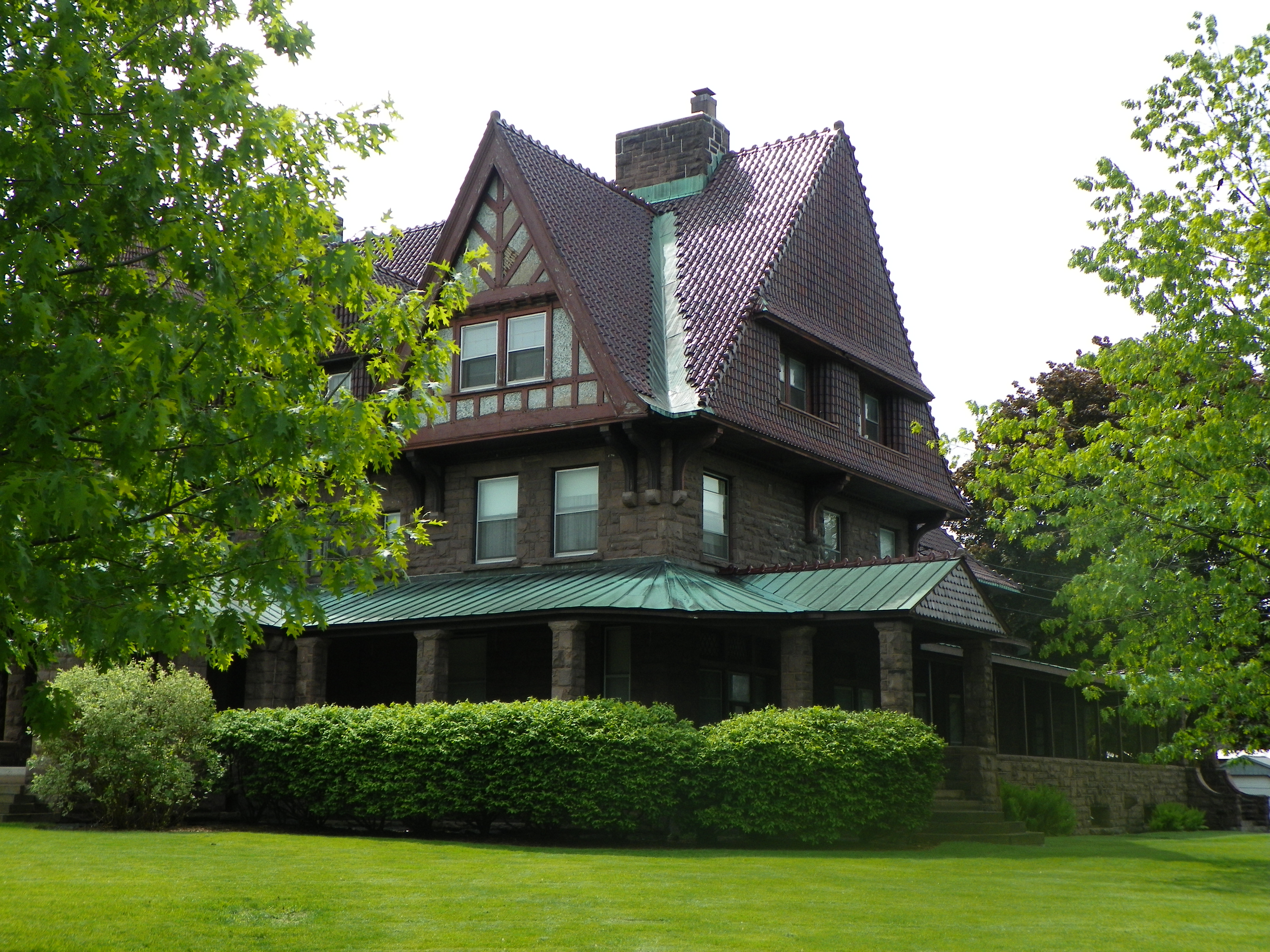
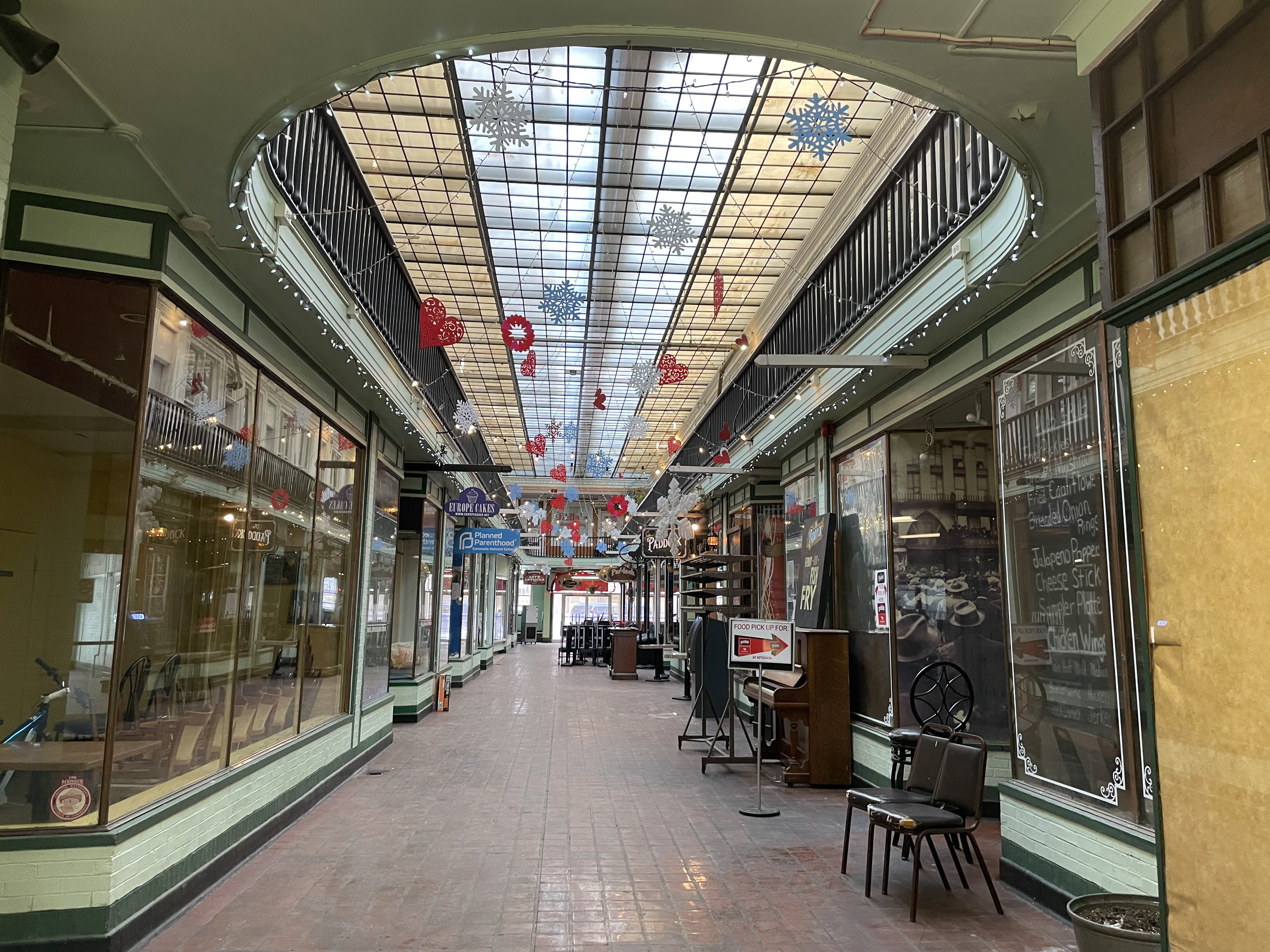
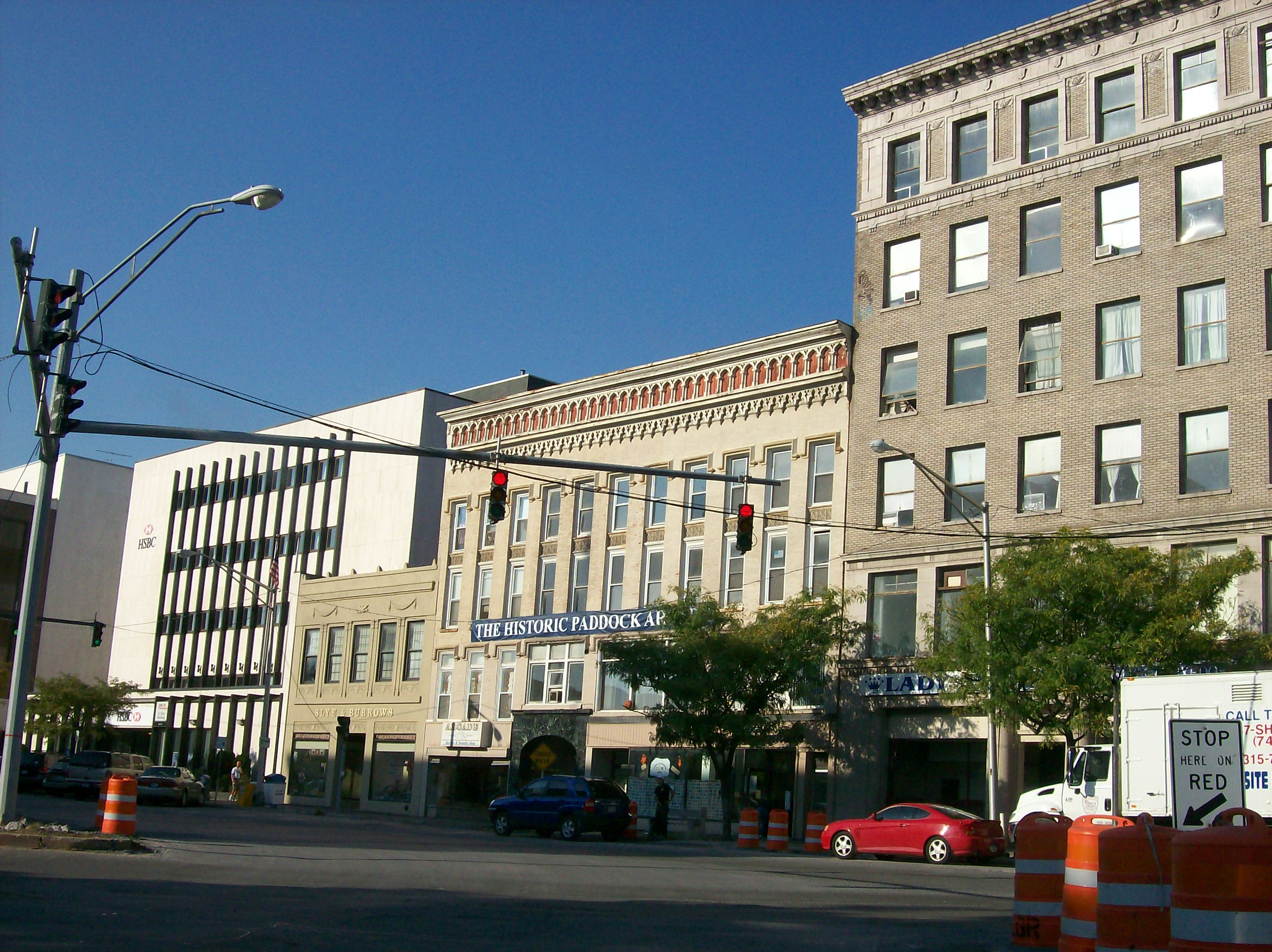
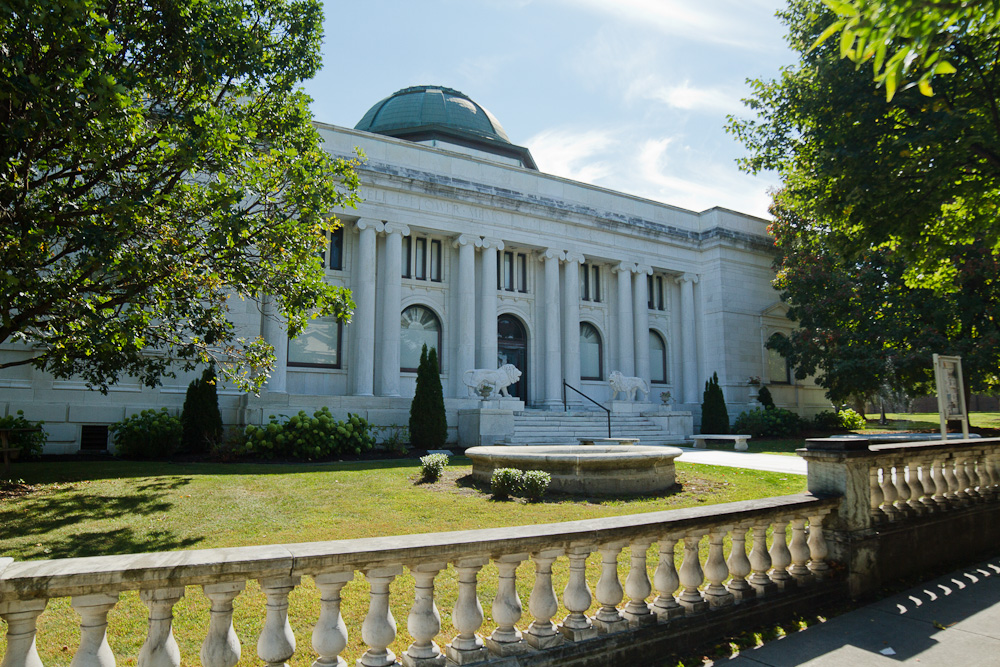
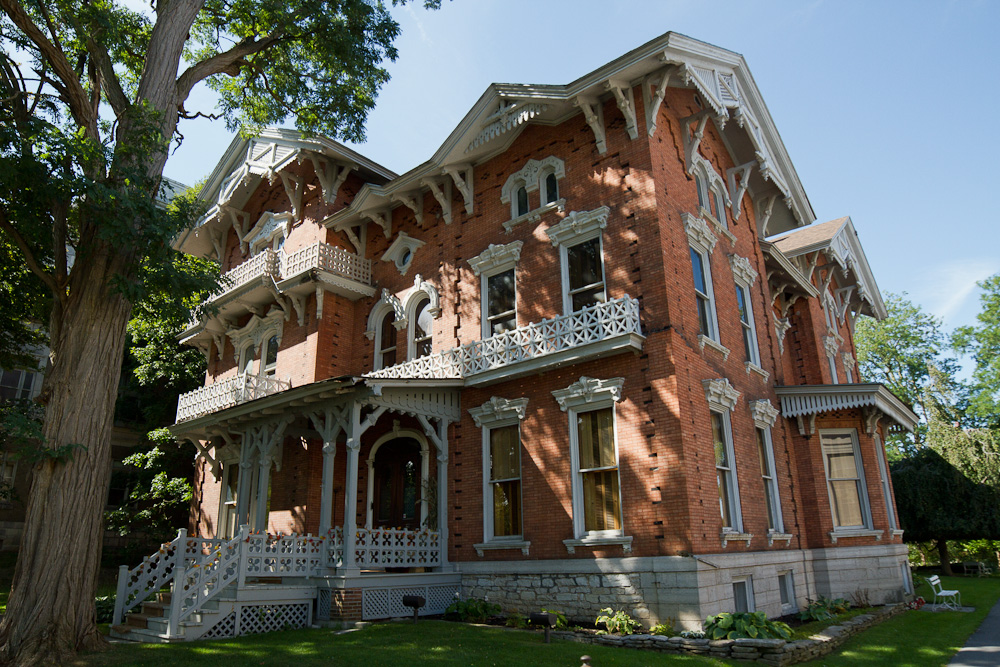
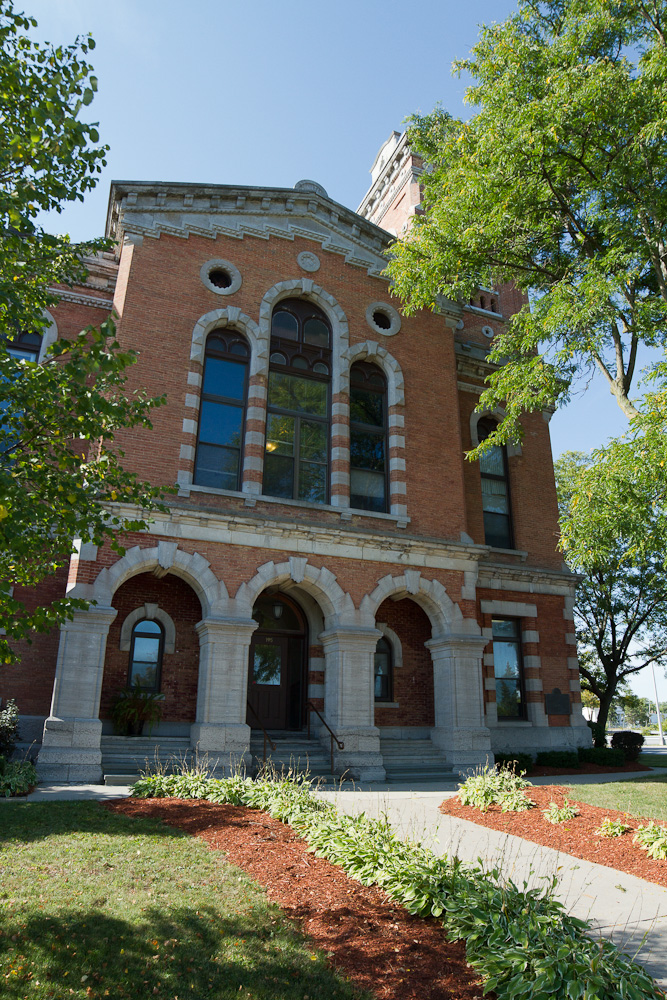
- Clockwise from top: the Public Square; the St. Paul's Episcopal Church; the Paddock Arcade; the Roswell P. Flower Memorial Library; the Jefferson County Courthouse Complex; the Paddock Mansion; a set of buildings including the Paddock Arcade; the Emma Flower Taylor Mansion; the Black River.

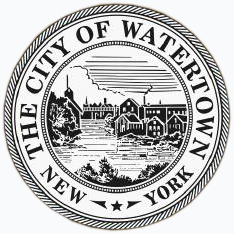
- Flag Seal
- Nickname: The Garland City
- Interactive map of Watertown
- Location within New York Location within the United States
- Coordinates: 43°58′32″N 75°54′23″W
- Country: United States
- State: New York
- County: Jefferson
- Region: North Country
- Settled: 1800; 226 years ago
- Incorporated (village): 1816; 210 years ago
- Incorporated (city): 1869; 157 years ago

Government
  - Type: Council-Manager
  - Mayor: Sarah Compo Pierce
  - City council: Members' List: • Benjamin P. Shoen; • Robert O. Kimball; • Lisa A. L'Huillier Ruggiero; • Clifford G. Olney III

Area
  - Total: 9.39 sq mi (24.31 km^{2})
  - Land: 9.03 sq mi (23.39 km^{2})
  - Water: 0.36 sq mi (0.92 km^{2})
- Elevation: 466 ft (142 m)

Population (2020)
  - Total: 24,685
  - Density: 2,733.0/sq mi (1,055.21/km^{2})
- Demonym: Watertownian
- Time zone: UTC−5 (EST)
  - Summer (DST): UTC−4 (EDT)
- Zip Codes: 13601, 13602
- Area code: 315
- FIPS code: 36-78608
- GNIS feature ID: 0968914
- Website: www.watertown-ny.gov

Watertown is a city in and the county seat of Jefferson County, New York, United States. It is approximately 25 miles (40 km) south of the Thousand Islands, along the Black River, about 5 miles (8 km) east of where it flows into Lake Ontario. The city is bordered by the town of Watertown to the south, east, and west, and is served by the Watertown International Airport and the Watertown Daily Times newspaper. In the middle of Watertown lies the Public Square Historic District, which was built in 1805 and listed on the National Register of Historic Places (NRHP) in 1984. Watertown is located 13 miles (21 kilometers) southwest of the U.S. Army base at Fort Drum; it is the service and shopping destination for personnel there and their families. As of the 2020 United States census, the city has 24,685 residents, making it the largest city in the North Country.

The area was first surveyed in 1795, and was settled in March 1800 due to the abundant hydropower the Black River provided. The city was designated as the county seat of Jefferson County when it was split off from Oneida County in 1805. Watertown was incorporated as a village in 1816, and became a city in 1869. By then, it was booming as an industrial center for Upstate New York. During the mid-1960s, Chicago attracted many of the younger residents from the area along with their businesses, leading to the demolition of many historic buildings and a steady decline in population. By 2000, the city had lost over 7,000 residents.

The city serves as the commercial and financial center for the North Country. Located 30 miles (48 km) from the Canadian border, shopping by Canadian visitors is important to Watertown's economy. The city also receives numerous tourists and summer residents. Watertown, South Dakota, was named in the city's honor.

== History ==
=== Etymology ===
Watertown got its name from straddling the Black River. It is unknown which settler chose it, but it is commonly believed to have been a consensus choice in order to attract mills. By 1850, mills manufacturing different products, powered by the Black river, were being built throughout Watertown.

=== Precolonial and colonial eras ===
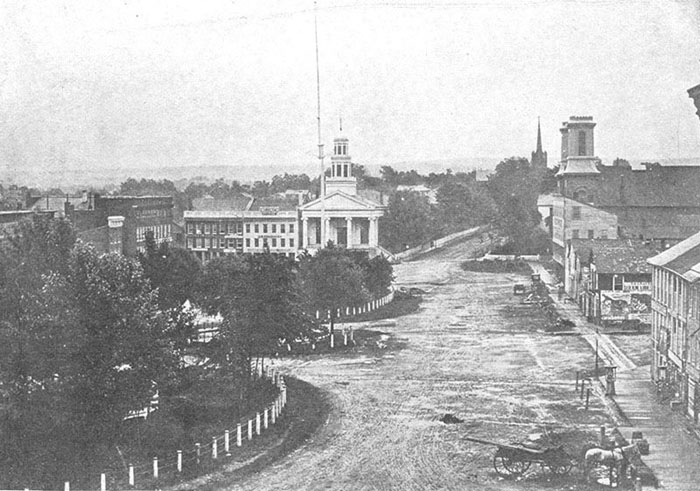
The Old Baptist church inside the Public Square c. 1865

Map of Watertown, 1891

In 1791, New York City resident Alexander Macomb purchased the land of Jefferson, Lewis, St. Lawrence and Oswego counties. He sent out multiple surveyors to sell the land to passing settlers. The area of Watertown was first surveyed in 1796 by Benjamin Wright, who was employed by Macomb to survey the northern and central portions of New York State. Wright made the following statement about the land after returning:

Along the river there is some good land and some that is broken and rocky. The river is amazing rapid and rocky; some falls along the river which may be made good mill seats, and some excellent pine timber along the river. On the east line is a fine country. The west line is of good quality. There are some fine mill seats in this town which on the map are marked 'falls' and 'rapids.' To speak generally I think this to be an excellent town-ship, and scarcely any poor land upon it. Will settle very fast, if laid in lots and sold to settlers.

In 1798, pioneers Hart Massey, Henry Coffeen, and Zachariah Butterfield built cabins in what is now the Public Square area as part of a large migration into New York from New England after the Revolutionary War. The land was very uneven territory and was leveled out in one of the first landfill projects in the United States. The area was taken from the nearby town of Mexico in 1800.

Coffeen then moved his family into Watertown. He and the other pioneers chose the area due to the Black River, which flowed west into Lake Ontario about 5 mi (8.0 km) away. Their vision was for an industrial center that would draw power from the river. In 1805, settlers cleared the center of town to create Public Square. During the 19th century, several significant buildings were built around it. The area has been designated as a historic district, listed on the NRHP. Watertown was designated as the seat of Jefferson County after it was split from Oneida County. At that time, Watertown was one of the least populated places in the county.

Watertown was incorporated as a village in 1816. In 1869, it reincorporated as a city.

Due to its proximity to Lake Ontario, Watertown became a popular location for transporting supplies into Canada, which helped its economy. As industry and businesses flourished, successful residents built substantial retail buildings, churches, and private residences close to the square. After the Embargo Act of 1807 was passed which prohibited trade with Britain and France, which at the time included Canada. The economy suffered as a result and eventually led to smuggling materials into Canada, leading to the War of 1812. During the Civil War, the 35th New York Infantry Regiment began in Watertown.

The Paddock Arcade, built in 1850 according to European and US models, is the oldest continuously operating enclosed mall in the United States. It is also listed on the National Register, as are several mansions and churches, such as the Emma Flower Taylor Mansion and the Trinity Episcopal Church. The drops in the Black at Watertown's location—40 feet (12 m) in the center of town, and 120 feet (37 m) over 2.5 miles (4.0 km)—provided abundant water power for early industry.

By the mid-19th century, entrepreneurs had built paper mills and major industries, including one to manufacture the first portable steam engine in 1847. In the late 1840s Watertown saw an influx in population from Irish migration into the area during the famine. In 1849 a fire began in the public square that destroyed most of the surrounding buildings. In 1851, the city was joined to Albany, Syracuse, and Rochester as well as other major cities of the state with the Rome, Watertown and Ogdensburg Railroad. Other mills were added to the business base, generating revenue to support the city's early public works projects, such as the water system and illuminating gas works in 1853, and a telephone system in 1879.

Watertown claims that Rodman native Frank W. Woolworth conceived the idea of his eponymous mercantile chain while working here in 1878. Woolworth, then employed as a clerk in Moore's Store, set up a successful clearance display of low-priced items. This led to his idea of a store specializing in fixed-price, cut-rate merchandise. Woolworth left Watertown and opened his first store in 1879 in Utica. Among the many manufacturing businesses was the Davis Sewing Machine Company, which originated in Watertown. It was the predecessor to George P. Huffman's Huffy Corporation, now a maker of bicycles and other sporting goods.

In the late 1890s, many new factories and industries were established, increasing the population by over 17,000 in the span of 30 years. The city gained a reputation for gambling and prostitution. Watertown also developed an educated professional class of doctors and lawyers. The economic center of the country kept moving west following the development of the frontier and a shift of population into the Midwest. In 1920, the city adopted a city manager-style of government.

After the Wall Street Crash of 1929, many stores shut down and laid off a considerable amount of their workforce, leading to economic hardships until World War II, when Watertown's industries switched from consumer products to war materiel, revitalizing the economy.

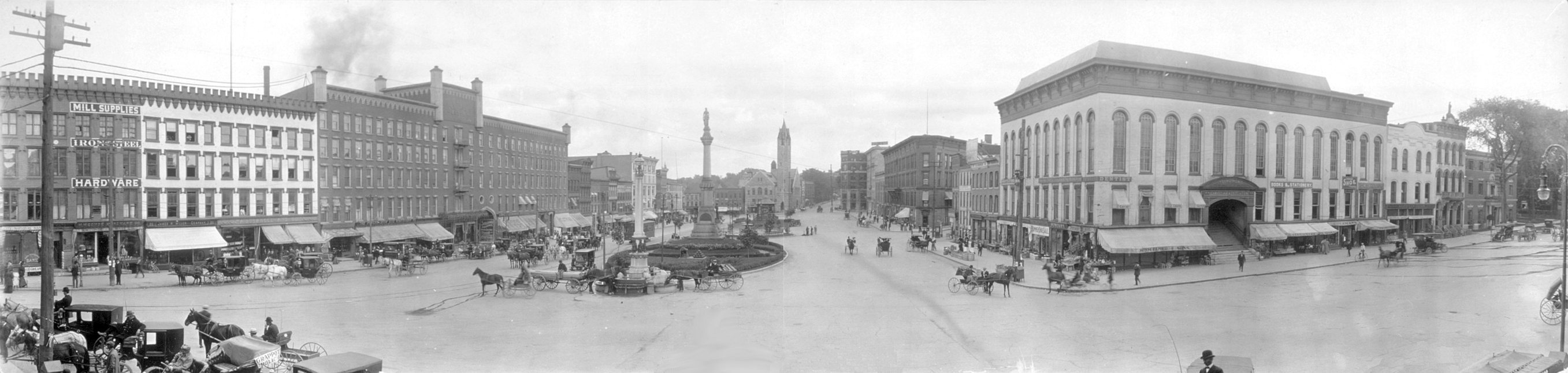
Public Square, 1909

=== Contemporary history ===
Little Trees were developed in Watertown in 1951; the Car-Freshner Corporation headquarters and manufacturing plant is located in the city. In the 1960s and 1970s, Watertown began a large de-industrialization which destroyed many historic buildings, such as the Hotel Woodruff and old courthouse. Watertown suffered economic and population declines. As Chicago boomed, it attracted many of the younger people from upstate New York for its business and professional opportunities. By the 1980s, unemployment in the area was up 20 percent.

In the 21st century, the city serves as a hub for a large rural area. In 2006, the city began a $7.4 million project that restored multiple buildings as well as fixing roads and walkways. The city completed this project in 2008, although more fixes are planned. In early 2019, Watertown was named "The Least Politically Prejudiced Place in America" by Amanda Ripley.

== Geography ==
Watertown is around 60 miles (97 kilometers) north of Syracuse, 20 miles (32 kilometers) south of the Thousand Islands and 328 miles (530 kilometers) northwest of New York City. According to the United States Census Bureau, the city has a total area of 9.3 square miles (24 km^{2}), of which 9.0 square miles (23 km^{2}) are land and 0.3 square miles (0.78 km^{2}) (3.45 percent) is water. Before the area was settled, all the land was rough and forested. Elevation was also a problem. The Black River, flowing westward through the city toward Lake Ontario, is a world-renowned kayaking destination. Competition-level kayaking events, such as the Blackwater Challenge, have been held on the river.

=== Climate ===
Watertown has a humid continental climate or hemiboreal climate(Köppen: Dfb), with cold, snowy winters and an atypical autumn maximum precipitation regime, this being far more common in areas on the west coasts of landmasses (this may be the result of Lake Ontario located to the west of Watertown, thus providing a "west coast"). Unless otherwise noted, all figures cited below are from the GHCN station located closer to downtown.

Winters can be very cold: temperatures remain at or below the freezing mark on an average of 54 days annually, and fall to 0 °F (−18 °C) or below on an average 20 nights. Moreover, Watertown is located in plant hardiness zone 4b, which means that the temperature is likely to drop below −20 °F (−29 °C) at least once a year. Summers are mild to warm, and temperatures of 90 °F (32 °C) or above on average occur on only 3.1 days annually. Record temperatures range from a low of −39 °F (−39 °C) on December 29, 1933, up to highs of 99 °F (37 °C) on July 20 and 27, 1894, although those at the airport have dropped as low as −43 °F (−42 °C) on January 16, 1994.

Precipitation averages 44.36 inches (1,127 mm), and is distributed fairly uniformly throughout the year, with slightly more during autumn and slightly less during spring and late winter. Since Watertown is situated near the eastern edge of Lake Ontario, it receives much lake-effect snow, averaging 116.4 inches (296 cm) of snowfall in the winter.

Climate data for Watertown, New York (GHCN station, 151.5 m (497 ft) AMSL), 1991–2020 normals, extremes 1893–present
Month	Jan	Feb	Mar	Apr	May	Jun	Jul	Aug	Sep	Oct	Nov	Dec	Year
Record high °F (°C)	66 (19)	67 (19)	82 (28)	92 (33)	92 (33)	98 (37)	99 (37)	97 (36)	96 (36)	87 (31)	78 (26)	69 (21)	99 (37)
Mean maximum °F (°C)	54.5 (12.5)	51.5 (10.8)	63.1 (17.3)	77.7 (25.4)	84.2 (29.0)	88.8 (31.6)	90.0 (32.2)	89.5 (31.9)	86.0 (30.0)	77.9 (25.5)	67.5 (19.7)	56.7 (13.7)	91.5 (33.1)
Mean daily maximum °F (°C)	28.9 (−1.7)	30.9 (−0.6)	39.6 (4.2)	53.5 (11.9)	66.9 (19.4)	75.3 (24.1)	79.8 (26.6)	78.7 (25.9)	71.8 (22.1)	58.6 (14.8)	46.4 (8.0)	34.9 (1.6)	55.4 (13.0)
Daily mean °F (°C)	19.8 (−6.8)	21.3 (−5.9)	30.6 (−0.8)	44.0 (6.7)	57.0 (13.9)	66.1 (18.9)	70.9 (21.6)	69.6 (20.9)	62.1 (16.7)	49.8 (9.9)	38.4 (3.6)	27.3 (−2.6)	46.4 (8.0)
Mean daily minimum °F (°C)	10.7 (−11.8)	11.7 (−11.3)	21.6 (−5.8)	34.5 (1.4)	47.2 (8.4)	56.9 (13.8)	62.0 (16.7)	60.5 (15.8)	52.3 (11.3)	41.0 (5.0)	30.5 (−0.8)	19.7 (−6.8)	37.4 (3.0)
Mean minimum °F (°C)	−15.3 (−26.3)	−11.7 (−24.3)	−0.5 (−18.1)	20.5 (−6.4)	32.2 (0.1)	43.3 (6.3)	50.6 (10.3)	47.1 (8.4)	37.2 (2.9)	25.7 (−3.5)	13.0 (−10.6)	−4.1 (−20.1)	−18.7 (−28.2)
Record low °F (°C)	−34 (−37)	−31 (−35)	−21 (−29)	1 (−17)	21 (−6)	30 (−1)	35 (2)	36 (2)	26 (−3)	15 (−9)	−3 (−19)	−39 (−39)	−39 (−39)
Average precipitation inches (mm)	3.58 (91)	2.88 (73)	2.75 (70)	3.53 (90)	3.65 (93)	3.71 (94)	3.47 (88)	3.84 (98)	3.85 (98)	5.01 (127)	4.24 (108)	3.85 (98)	44.36 (1,127)
Average snowfall inches (cm)	34.0 (86)	29.6 (75)	13.6 (35)	2.7 (6.9)	0.0 (0.0)	0.0 (0.0)	0.0 (0.0)	0.0 (0.0)	0.0 (0.0)	0.5 (1.3)	9.1 (23)	26.9 (68)	116.4 (296)
Average precipitation days (≥ 0.01 in)	17.9	14.8	13.1	13.6	13.8	12.7	11.0	11.1	11.6	16.1	15.0	17.3	168.0
Average snowy days (≥ 0.1 in)	11.7	10.1	5.6	1.3	0.0	0.0	0.0	0.0	0.0	0.1	3.4	9.1	41.3
Source: NOAA

Climate data for Watertown International Airport, New York (96.9 m (318 ft) AMSL), 1991–2020 normals, extremes 1949–present
Month	Jan	Feb	Mar	Apr	May	Jun	Jul	Aug	Sep	Oct	Nov	Dec	Year
Record high °F (°C)	66 (19)	66 (19)	84 (29)	89 (32)	91 (33)	95 (35)	97 (36)	96 (36)	96 (36)	84 (29)	77 (25)	69 (21)	97 (36)
Mean maximum °F (°C)	54.5 (12.5)	51.8 (11.0)	62.9 (17.2)	77.4 (25.2)	83.2 (28.4)	87.8 (31.0)	89.2 (31.8)	88.8 (31.6)	85.4 (29.7)	77.1 (25.1)	67.1 (19.5)	56.2 (13.4)	90.9 (32.7)
Mean daily maximum °F (°C)	29.8 (−1.2)	31.4 (−0.3)	40.0 (4.4)	53.7 (12.1)	66.2 (19.0)	74.5 (23.6)	79.2 (26.2)	78.2 (25.7)	71.2 (21.8)	58.4 (14.7)	46.6 (8.1)	35.5 (1.9)	55.4 (13.0)
Daily mean °F (°C)	19.9 (−6.7)	21.1 (−6.1)	30.4 (−0.9)	43.1 (6.2)	55.0 (12.8)	63.8 (17.7)	69.0 (20.6)	67.5 (19.7)	60.0 (15.6)	48.8 (9.3)	38.0 (3.3)	27.3 (−2.6)	45.3 (7.4)
Mean daily minimum °F (°C)	10.0 (−12.2)	10.7 (−11.8)	20.7 (−6.3)	32.5 (0.3)	43.7 (6.5)	53.1 (11.7)	58.8 (14.9)	56.7 (13.7)	48.8 (9.3)	39.2 (4.0)	29.5 (−1.4)	19.0 (−7.2)	35.2 (1.8)
Mean minimum °F (°C)	−22.7 (−30.4)	−19.7 (−28.7)	−4.5 (−20.3)	17.7 (−7.9)	29.3 (−1.5)	38.9 (3.8)	45.4 (7.4)	42.2 (5.7)	32.2 (0.1)	22.1 (−5.5)	10.2 (−12.1)	−9.9 (−23.3)	−28.0 (−33.3)
Record low °F (°C)	−43 (−42)	−37 (−38)	−24 (−31)	6 (−14)	18 (−8)	29 (−2)	33 (1)	30 (−1)	22 (−6)	12 (−11)	−7 (−22)	−37 (−38)	−43 (−42)
Average precipitation inches (mm)	2.86 (73)	2.18 (55)	2.37 (60)	3.07 (78)	2.97 (75)	3.09 (78)	3.01 (76)	3.20 (81)	3.56 (90)	4.22 (107)	3.40 (86)	3.14 (80)	37.07 (942)
Average snowfall inches (cm)	31.6 (80)	20.7 (53)	12.0 (30)	2.8 (7.1)	0.1 (0.25)	0.0 (0.0)	0.0 (0.0)	0.0 (0.0)	0.0 (0.0)	0.2 (0.51)	7.0 (18)	25.8 (66)	100.2 (255)
Average precipitation days (≥ 0.01 in)	16.4	13.7	12.5	13.0	13.0	12.3	10.6	10.5	10.8	14.4	14.4	16.3	157.9
Average snowy days (≥ 0.1 in)	13.7	10.4	7.0	2.4	0.1	0.0	0.0	0.0	0.1	0.4	4.5	12.0	50.6
Source: NOAA (snow 1981–2010)

== Demographics ==
Line graph of the population over time

Historical population
Census	Pop.	Note	%±
1870	9,336		—
1880	10,697		14.6%
1890	14,725		37.7%
1900	21,696		47.3%
1910	26,730		23.2%
1920	31,285		17.0%
1930	32,205		2.9%
1940	33,385		3.7%
1950	34,350		2.9%
1960	33,306		−3.0%
1970	30,787		−7.6%
1980	27,861		−9.5%
1990	29,429		5.6%
2000	26,705		−9.3%
2010	27,023		1.2%
2020	24,685		−8.7%
U.S. Decennial Census 2020

=== 2020 census ===
As of the 2020 census, Watertown had a population of 24,685 and a population density of 2,996.0 inhabitants per square mile (1,156.8/km^{2}). The median age was 35.5 years, with 7.9 percent of residents under age 5, 22.7 percent under 18, and 15.5 percent 65 years of age or older.

For every 100 females there were 94.5 males, and for every 100 females age 18 and over there were 91.6 males age 18 and over.

98.5 percent of residents lived in urban areas, while 1.5 percent lived in rural areas.

There were 10,979 households, of which 26.5 percent had children under the age of 18 living in them. Of all households, 31.1 percent were married-couple households, 24.7 percent were households with a male householder and no spouse or partner present, and 34.5 percent were households with a female householder and no spouse or partner present. About 39.9 percent of all households were made up of individuals and 12.8 percent had someone living alone who was 65 years of age or older.

There were 12,873 housing units, of which 14.7 percent were vacant. The homeowner vacancy rate was 4.6 percent and the rental vacancy rate was 14.1 percent.

Racial composition as of the 2020 census
Race	Number	Percent
White	19,681	79.7%
Black or African American	1,537	6.2%
American Indian and Alaska Native	147	0.6%
Asian	515	2.1%
Native Hawaiian and Other Pacific Islander	30	0.1%
Some other race	523	2.1%
Two or more races	2,252	9.1%
Hispanic or Latino (of any race)	1,703	6.9%

=== 2010 census ===
As of the 2010 census, there were 27,023 people living in the city. The racial makeup of the village was 86.25 percent White, 6.04 percent African American, 0.58 percent Native American, 1.83 percent Asian, 0.18 percent Pacific Islander, 1.33 percent from other races, and 3.79 percent from two or more races. Hispanic or Latino people of any race were 5.59 percent of the population.

=== 2000 census ===
As of the census of 2000, there were 26,705 people, 11,036 households, and 6,500 families living in the city. The population density was 2,981.3 inhabitants per square mile (1,151.1/km^{2}). There were 12,450 housing units at an average density of 1,389.9/sq mi (536.6/km^{2}). The racial makeup of the city was 89.13 percent White, 4.95 percent Black or African American, 0.54 percent Native American, 1.16 percent Asian, 0.11 percent Pacific Islander, 1.67 percent from other races, and 2.45 percent from two or more races. Hispanic or Latino people of any race were 3.59 percent of the population.

The median income for a household in the city was $28,429, and the median income for a family was $36,115. Males had a median income of $31,068 versus $21,294 for females. The per capita income for the city was $16,354. About 14.4 percent of families and 19.3 percent of the population were below the poverty line, including 25.2 percent of those under age 18 and 11.8 percent of those aged 65 or over.

== Economy ==
During the 2020 US Census the median price for owner-occupied housing units was $133,400, with the median income for a household being $40,253. Because the city is located 30 miles (48 km) from the Canada–United States border via the Thousand Islands Bridge, shopping by Canadian visitors is an important part of the local economy. In the 1980s, unemployment in the area was up 20 percent, and property values rapidly decreased. After Fort Drum was established, Watertown's industry shifted from industrial to consumer products.

=== Industry ===
The city contains Factory Square, 80 acres (32 hectares) of factories that were once powered by the Black River. In the 1880s and 1890s, many new factories were established, which began an economic boom. In 1900 3,760 workers were employed in the factories. Immediately adjacent to the factories and river was a prominent saloon district, which became a common location for scams, and the Watertown Daily Times often referenced workers being scammed by "tinhorn gamblers and short-card men".

In fall 2019, the city began a revitalization program for Sewall's Island and Factory Square in hopes of attracting new investments, businesses, and identifying transformational projects in the area. The city was awarded a Strategic Planning and Feasibility Studies grant from the New York Department of State to pay for the plan.

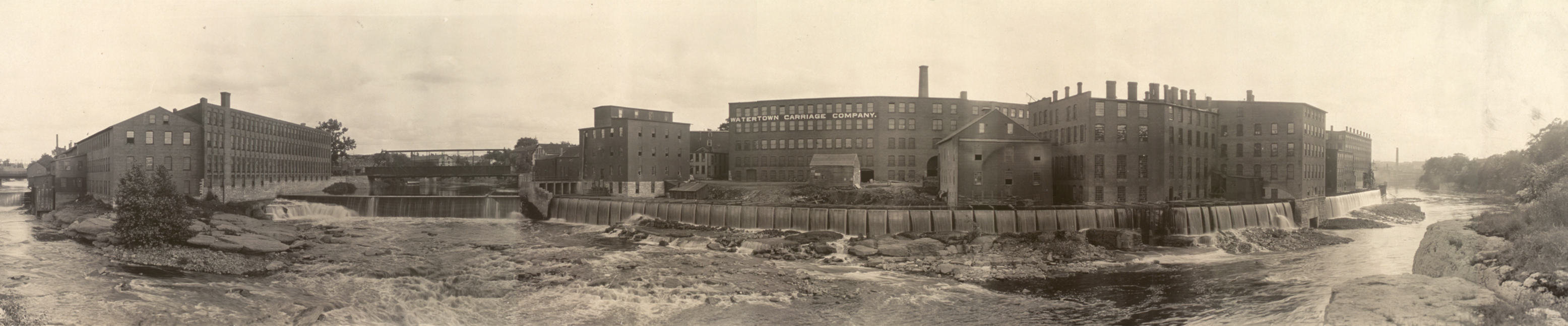
1909 Panorama of Factory Square above the Black River

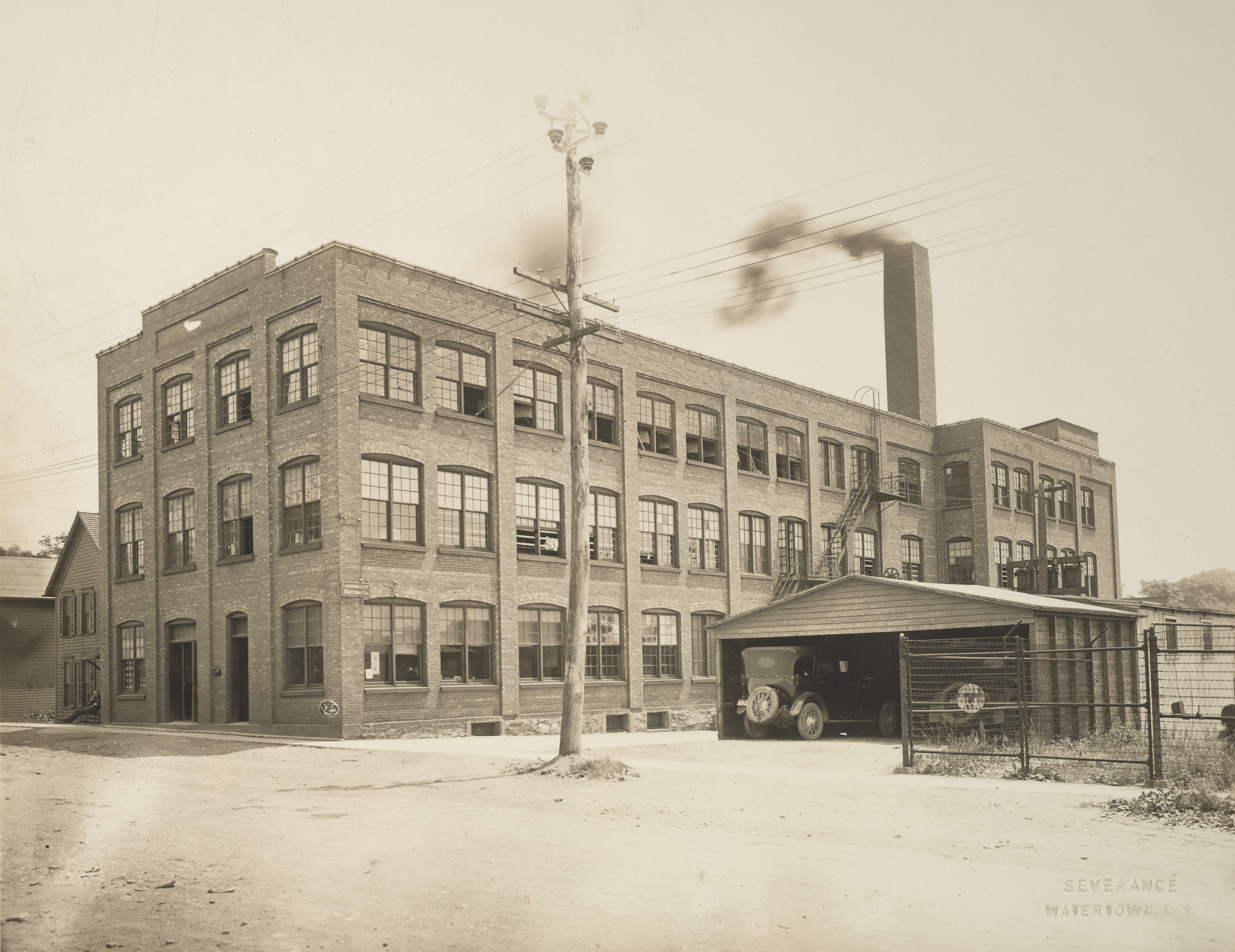
The Shaughnessy Knitting Mill inside of Factory Square (c. 1918)

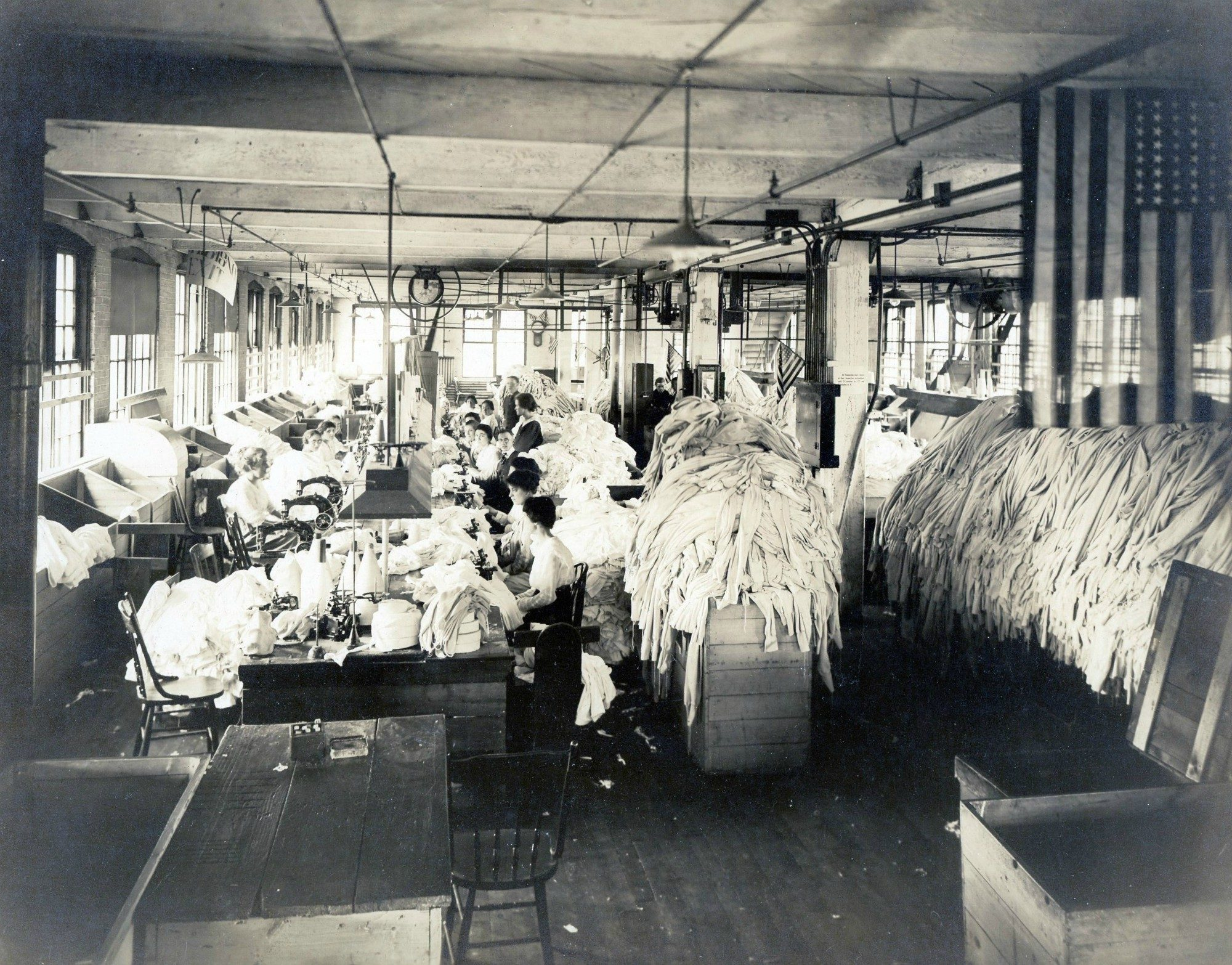
Workers inside the Shaughnessy Knitting Mill inside Factory Square (c. 1910s)

== Arts and culture ==
The Roswell P. Flower Memorial Library was built in 1904 as a memorial to Flower by his daughter, Emma Flower Taylor. The area also has a large Amish population.

=== Historic sites ===
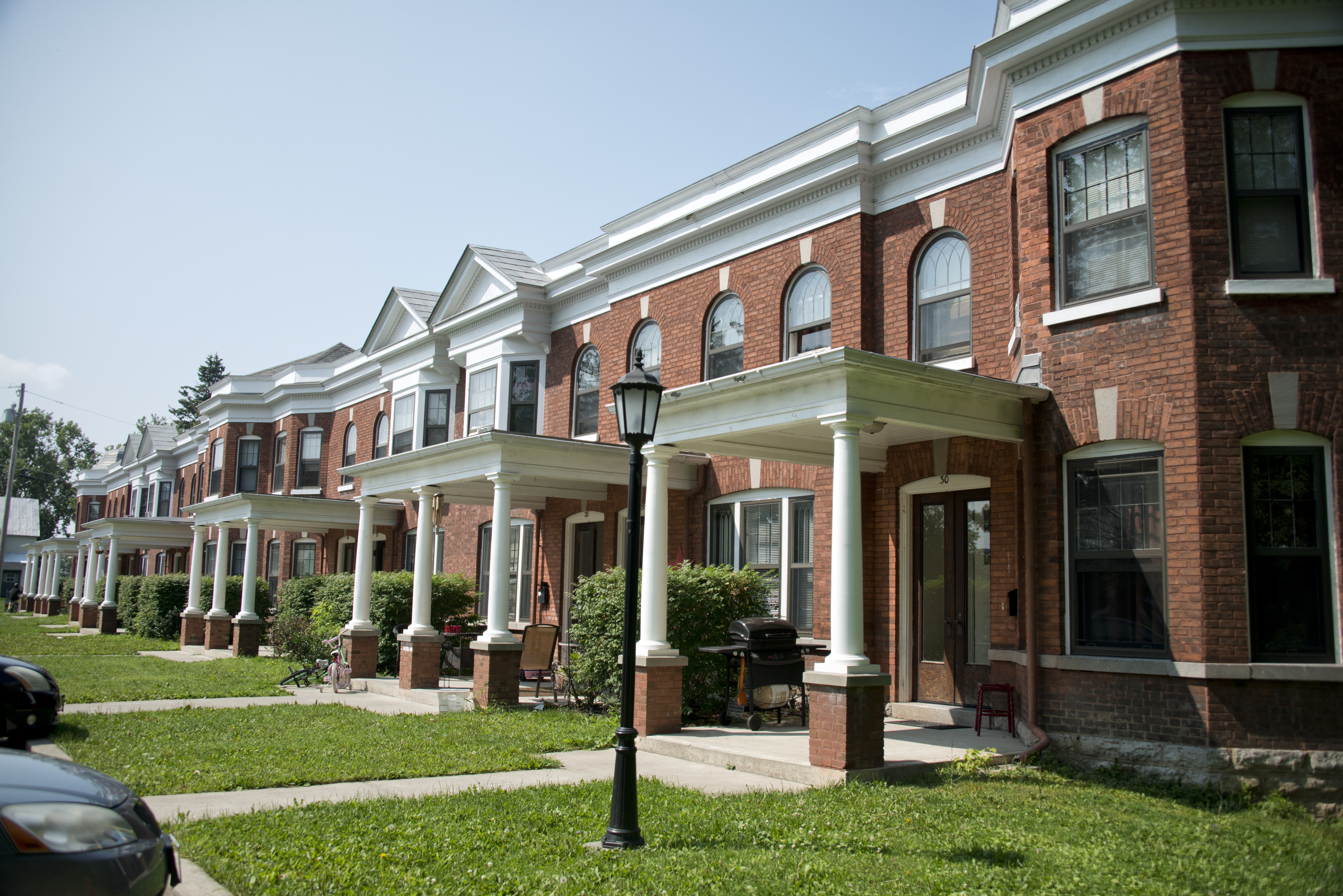
The Emerson Place

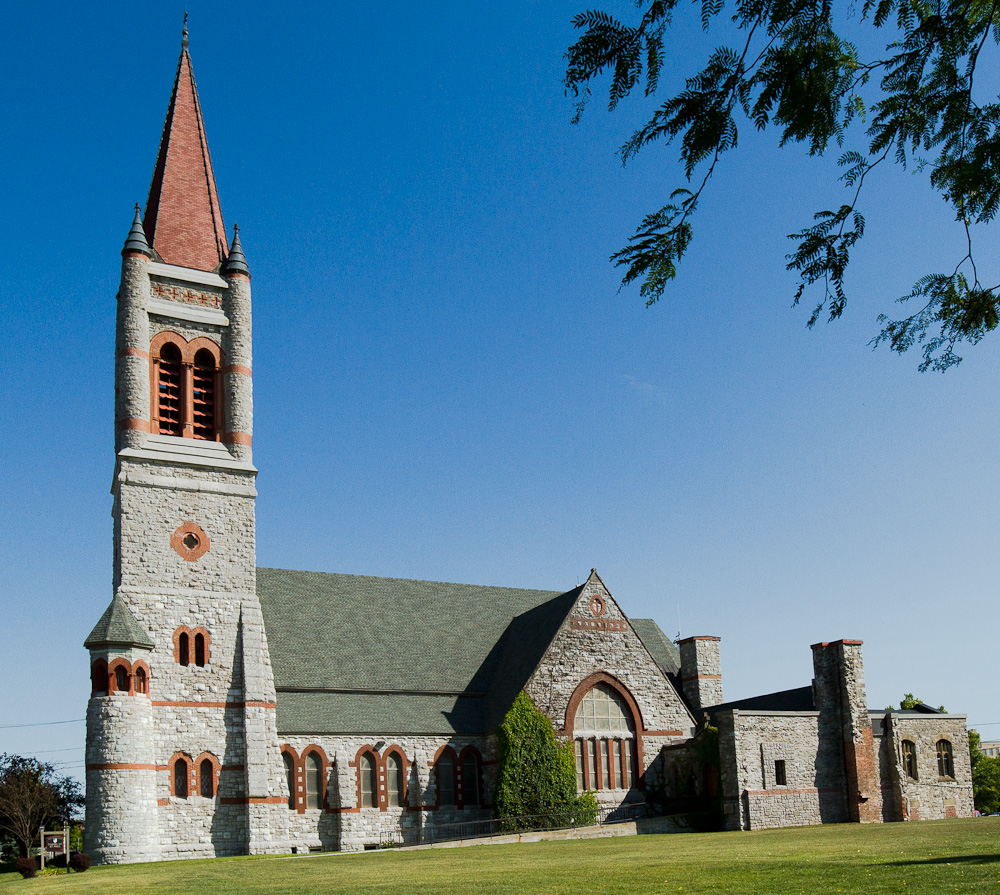
The Trinity Episcopal Church

Watertown contains a number of historic buildings and districts. Buildings on the NRHP include the Paddock Mansion (added December 11, 1979), the Watertown Masonic Temple (added January 23, 1980), and the Emerson Place (added April 18, 2003), as well as several buildings inside the 16-acre (6.5-hectare) Public Square Historic District (added September 7, 1984). The Jefferson County Courthouse Complex is an example of the substantial architecture of the city.

== Sports ==
The Duffy Fairgrounds is currently home to three sports teams. The Watertown Red & Black of the Gridiron Developmental Football League. The Red & Black are the oldest active semipro football team in the United States, founded in 1896. The Watertown Rapids of the Perfect Game Collegiate Baseball League have played here starting in 2017, following several professional teams. The Watertown Wolves have played at the municipal arena at the fairgrounds since 2012. They are a member of the Federal Prospects Hockey League and have won three titles, in 2015, 2018, and 2022.

After first hosting a minor league baseball team in the 1888 Eastern International League, Watertown and Duffy Fairgrounds hosted several others. The Watertown Bucks of the Can-Am League (1936), the Watertown Athletics of the Border League (1946-1951), the Watertown Pirates (1983-1988) and Watertown Indians of the New York-Penn League (1989-1998) played at the Duffy Fairgrounds. Watertown teams were an affiliate of the Boston Bees (1936), Pittsburgh Pirates (1983-1988) and Cleveland Indians (1989-1998).

Club	Sport	League	Founded	Venue	League titles	Championship years
Watertown Wolves	Ice hockey	Federal Prospects Hockey League	2010	Watertown Municipal Arena	3	2015,2018,2022
Watertown Rapids	Baseball	Perfect Game Collegiate Baseball League	2017	Duffy Fairgrounds	0	—
Watertown Red & Black	Football	Gridiron Developmental Football League	1896	Duffy Fairgrounds	0	—

== Parks and recreation ==
Thompson Park is about 450 acres (180 hectares) of park designed by John Charles Olmsted. The park was gifted to the city in 1916. The park contains Zoo New York, which began in 1920 when the Northern New York Trust Company donated two whitetail deer to Thompson Park and the City of Watertown. The following are also located inside the park:

- A half-acre (2,000 m^{2}) of children's playground
- A stone pavilion building with benches
- Small stone stairways that serve as a hiking trail
- Hills that are often used as sledding areas
- The Watertown Golf Club
- Tennis courts
- Outdoor skating area
- Cross-country ski trails

== Government ==
The city's government was created after the village's incorporation in 1816. The act of incorporation provided for the election of five trustees, one for each ward. These extended to the formation of a fire department, the construction of water works and regulation of streets. In 1816, the first village election was held, at which Timothy Burr was chosen President. Sixteen years later, the village trustees were empowered by an act of the Legislature to borrow up to $2,000 ($65,000 in modern dollars) to improve the fire department. In 1835 legislation authorized the construction of a market. In 1852, the boundaries of the village were extended and two wards added, making seven total. The officers consisted of a President, three Assessors, a Clerk, a Treasurer, a Collector and two police constables. Elections were held on the first Monday in March. Watertown is served by the Watertown Police Department and the Jefferson County Sheriff's Office.

Watertown
Crime rates (2012–2019)
Crime type	2012	2013	2014	2015	2016	2017	2018	2019
Homicide:	0	0	0	3	1	1	0	0
Rape:	12	12	47	48	41	39	65	57
Robbery:	20	16	17	15	15	16	19	14
Aggravated assault:	122	81	89	79	124	83	91	83
Total violent crime:	154	109	153	145	181	139	175	154
Burglary:	269	169	193	229	194	153	130	108
Larceny-theft:	1,183	953	1,097	1,067	953	880	755	743
Motor vehicle theft:	124	43	6	30	24	21	19	36
Total property crime:	1,576	1,165	1,296	1,326	1,171	1,054	904	887
Arson:	0	0	3	8	11	5	7	6
Sources: Newsday;FBI 2012, 2013, 2014, 2015, 2016, 2017, 2018 2019 data

== Education ==
Watertown is served by the Watertown City School District and the General Brown Central School District, which covers a portion of the Creekwood Apartment complex on the city's north side. The elementary schools are North, Ohio, Knickerbocker, Sherman, and Starbuck. The higher-level schools are H.T. Wiley Intermediate School, Case Middle School, Watertown High School, Immaculate Heart Central Elementary, Intermediate, and Junior and Senior High Schools, the Catholic and secular educational institutions. There is also a Faith Fellowship Christian School. Jefferson Community College (JCC) is located in the northwestern part of the city and serves as the only institution of higher education within a 50-mile (80 km) radius. It was started in 1961 and is part of the State University of New York (SUNY).

== Media ==
The local newspaper, the Watertown Daily Times, is published seven days a week and serves Jefferson, St. Lawrence and Lewis counties. The Fort Drum Mountaineer is a weekly newspaper for Fort Drum soldiers and their dependents.

The Watertown market is served by four commercial television stations. The oldest is Carthage-licensed, CBS-affiliated WCNY-TV (channel 7), put on the air in 1954 by the publishers of the Watertown Daily Times. The station changed its call letters to WWNY-TV in 1965. After an unsuccessful struggle against the Federal Communications Commission and its directive for newspapers to divest themselves of television stations held within the same market, the Daily Times sold WWNY-TV to United Communications Corporation of Kenosha, Wisconsin, in 1981.

In 2001, United Communications entered into an agreement with Smith Broadcasting to operate a Fox network affiliate with low-power transmitters in Watertown and Massena. After a year of joint operation, UCC took complete ownership of WNYF-CD/WWNY-CD (channel 28). Both WWNY and WNYF were sold to Atlanta-based Gray Television in 2019.

Watertown is also served by PBS member stations WPBS-TV/WNPI-DT (channels 16/18), NBC affiliate WVNC-LD/WVNV-LD (channel 45), and ABC affiliate WWTI (channel 50), which also operates the area's CW affiliate through The CW Plus.

=== Radio ===
Watertown is served by a number of radio stations:

Frequency	Call sign	Format	Notes
AM 790	WTNY	News/talk	Also heard on 95.9 FM W240EA in Watertown
AM 1240	WATN	News/talk	
AM 1410	WNER	sports	Also heard on 97.9 FM W250CI in Watertown
FM 88.9	WSLJ	public radio	
FM 90.1	WKWV	Christian contemporary	
FM 90.9	WJNY	Classical	
FM 91.7	WRVJ	public radio	
FM 92.5	WBLH	Variety hits	Licensed to Black River and also heard on 104.5 FM W283CC in Watertown
FM 93.3	WCIZ-FM	Classic hits	
FM 94.1	WOTT	mainstream rock	Licensed to Calcium
FM 94.7	WMHI	Christian radio	Licensed to Cape Vincent
FM 96.9	WWTJ-LP	Religious teaching	www.thewayradio.org
FM 97.5	WFRY-FM	Country music	
FM 100.7	WEFX	Country music	Licensed to Henderson
FM 102.7	WLYK	Gold-based adult contemporary	Licensed to Cape Vincent
FM 103.1	WTOJ	Adult contemporary	Licensed to Carthage and also heard on 100.1 FM W261CP in Lowville
FM 106.7	WBDR	CHR/Top 40	Licensed to Copenhagen

Radio stations are also heard in the Watertown area from neighboring communities including Kingston, Ontario, Canada.

== Infrastructure ==
The city is known partially because of its various late 19th century styles of architecture, including Eastlake as seen in the Paddock Mansion, Colonial Revival as seen in the Emerson Place and Queen Anne as seen in the Emma Flower Taylor Mansion.

=== Transportation ===
Watertown was the nexus of the Rome, Watertown & Ogdensburg Railroad, which was later absorbed into the New York Central Railroad (NYC) network. Watertown sat at the junction of five different lines, as trains from Syracuse, Rome, Oswego, and Utica passed through Watertown on their way to points along the St. Lawrence River (principally, Ogdensburg and Massena) and to Canada. The Watertown passenger station, situated along the Black River behind Public Square at what is now J.B. Wise Place, was described as among the finest in the system. With the decline in travel by rail after World War II, however, the last named passenger train with a sleeper section to the town was the Iroquois in 1961; the train carrying sleepers south from Watertown was the Fifth Avenue / Cleveland Limited, also ending in 1961. Passenger service to Watertown finally ended in 1964. The station itself was demolished and replaced with a parking lot. Although the rail network is greatly attenuated compared to its peak in the early 20th century, CSX Transportation still transports freight by rail through Watertown.

Interstate 81 runs through the Watertown area. It is a north-south route that runs from near Dandridge, Tennessee north to Hill Island, Ontario, connecting via the Thousand Islands Bridge and a short connecting road to Highway 401 across the Canada–US border. Interstate 81 passes just to the west of the city of Watertown, near Salmon Run Mall. Access to the highway is from Exits 45 (Route 3), 46 (Route 12F), and 47 (Route 12).

U.S. Route 11 runs from eastern New Orleans, Louisiana, to its northern terminus at the Canada–United States border in Rouses Point, New York. U.S. Route 11 runs north-south through the city of Watertown.

Many state highways converge on the city. New York State Route 3 is an east-west route that begins in Sterling and heads north and east to Watertown. NY 3 interchanges with I-81 at the city line. NY 3 heads east into Watertown, overlapping with both US 11 and NY 12 through downtown prior to leaving the city to the northeast to head through the Adirondacks to Plattsburgh.

New York State Route 12 is a north-south route through the city, extending northward to Clayton then following the St. Lawrence Seaway to Morristown. A spur, NY 12E, takes a slightly-longer path through Cape Vincent before rejoining NY 12.

New York State Route 12F is a spur connecting NY 12 in downtown Watertown to New York State Route 180 near the Watertown International Airport in Dexter.

Adirondack Trailways serves both Syracuse, to the south, and Potsdam, to the east, on its U.S. Route 11 run. CitiBus also serves Watertown.

Watertown International Airport is a county-owned, public-use airport located in Hounsfield, 6 miles (10 km) west of Watertown's central business district of Watertown. American Eagle has scheduled flights to and from Philadelphia.

== Notable people ==
=== Historic ===
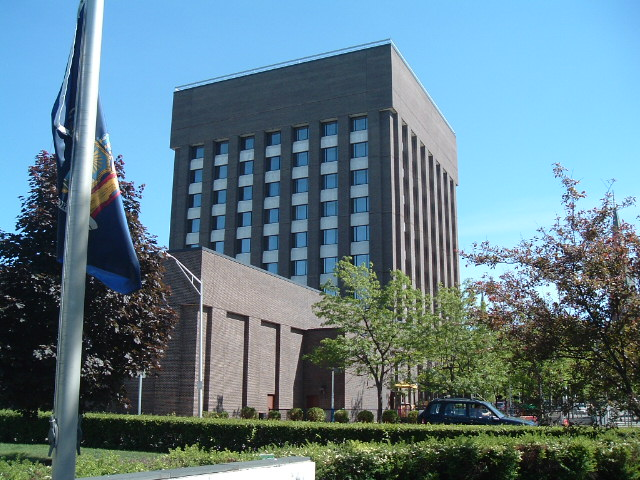
The tallest building in Watertown, the Dulles State Office Building, was named after John Foster Dulles.

During the late 19th century through the mid-20th century, Watertown became known for its extensive list of politicians born in or who studied in the city, notable examples include John Foster Dulles and Allen Dulles, who attended public schools in the city. The tallest building in the city, the Dulles State Office Building was named after Foster Dulles, and was built in 1970. State Senator Robert Lansing was born in Albany, New York in 1799 and moved to Watertown in 1817. His grandson, also named Robert Lansing, was born in Watertown and until 1907 he was a member of the law firm of Lansing & Lansing at Watertown and went on to become the 42nd United States Secretary of State.Joseph Mullin was born in Ireland and grew up in Watertown, and went on to be Member of the U.S. House of Representatives from New York's 19th district. Joseph Mullin was born in Watertown and was a member of the New York State Senate from 1892 until his death in 1897. Roswell P. Flower was born in Theresa and became Deputy Postmaster of Watertown in 1853, becoming 30th Governor of New York from 1892 to 1894. The Roswell P. Flower Memorial Library was named after him. Frank Winfield Woolworth was born in Rodman, New York and attended a business college for two terms in Watertown, New York where he came up for the idea of a five-and-dime.

=== Contemporary ===
Eric Anzalone was born in Dayton, Ohio, but grew up in Watertown, he was the leather-man of the group Village People from 1995 to 2017. Antonio Blakeney was born in Watertown and became a shooting guard in the NBA and for the Cleveland Charge. In May 2021, he was arrested for armed robbery but bonded out of jail. Bob McCreadie was born in Watertown and was a racer at the Watertown Speedway before its closure in 1975. Mary Gay Scanlon was born in Watertown and is a Member of the Pennsylvania delegation of the U.S. House of Representatives. Viggo Mortensen, an actor known for his role as Aragorn in The Lord of the Rings, moved with his mother to her hometown of Watertown at age 11 and attended Watertown High School before moving to Denmark after graduating from St. Lawrence University.

== In popular culture ==
Watertown has appeared in multiple pieces of media over the years. Writer Fred Exley grew up in Watertown, and he set much of his 1968 novel A Fan's Notes in the city. Frank Sinatra's 1970 concept album Watertown explores the life of a middle-aged man in Watertown, whose wife has left him and his children. Harry Chapin made a famous quote: "I spent a week there one afternoon" about Watertown. His song "A Better Place to Be" was inspired by a story he heard in Watertown. Chapin mentioned both the quote and the origin of the song on his 1976 album Greatest Stories Live. Watertown was the given setting for the 1990 Bette Midler film Stella. While the movie was filmed in Ontario, several local items were taken there to be shown in the film, including the local daily newspaper, taxi-cabs, and shopping bags from the locally owned Empsall's department store. In the 2005 film Robots, the fictional town of Rivet Town was rumored to be based on Watertown, where director Chris Wedge lived during his teens. However, Wedge dismissed this in an interview.
