= Emerson–Franklin Poole House =

Historic house in Massachusetts, United States

- U.S. National Register of Historic Places
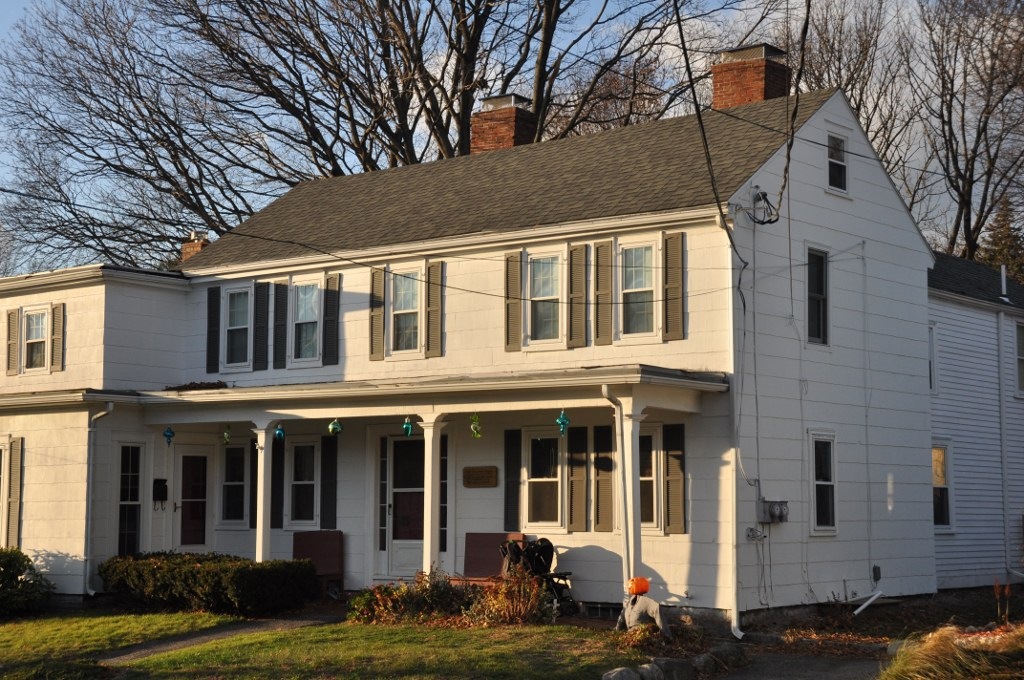

- Location within Massachusetts Location within the United States
- Location: 23 Salem St., Wakefield, Massachusetts
- Coordinates: 42°30′31″N 71°4′10″W
- Area: less than one acre
- Built: 1795
- Architectural style: Federal, Vernacular Federal
- MPS: Wakefield MRA
- NRHP reference No.: 89000685
- Added to NRHP: July 06, 1989

The Emerson–Franklin Poole House is a historic house at 23 Salem Street in Wakefield, Massachusetts. Built about 1795, it was in the 19th century home to Franklin Poole, a locally prominent landscape artist. Some of its walls are adorned with the murals drawn by Rufus Porter. The house was listed on the National Register of Historic Places in 1989.

== Description and history ==
The Emerson–Poole House stands in a residential area northeast of Wakefield's downtown area, on the north side of Salem Street between Main and Pleasant Streets. It is a 2 1/2-story wood-frame structure, five bays wide, with a side gable roof, clapboard siding, and two asymmetrically placed chimneys. The main facade is also slightly asymmetrical. A mid-19th-century porch with modest vernacular Italianate features extends across the full width of the front, and additions project to the side and rear of the original structure.

The house was built about 1795 by Elias Emerson, who sold it to Timothy Poole, a house painter. It was the birthplace in 1808 and home of locally prominent painter Franklin Poole, who captured many historically significant scenes of Wakefield in the mid-19th century. The house is also important for the murals of Rufus Porter, an important itinerant muralist, painted on its walls, and as a well-preserved local example of Federal period architecture.

== See also ==
- National Register of Historic Places listings in Wakefield, Massachusetts
- National Register of Historic Places listings in Middlesex County, Massachusetts
