= Ezekiel Emerson Farm =

- U.S. National Register of Historic Places
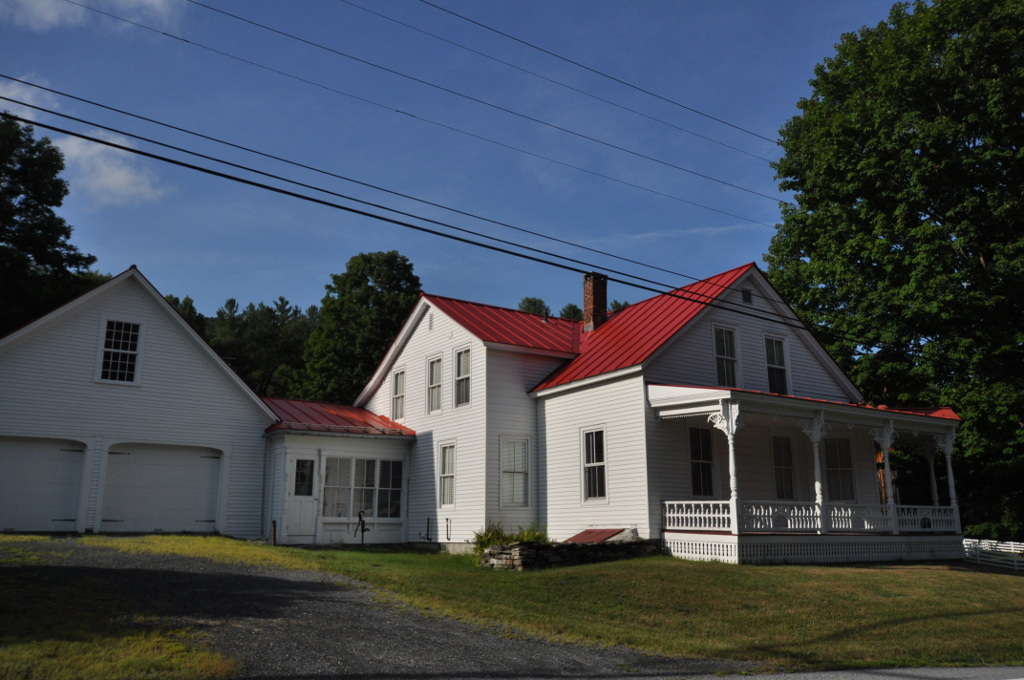

- Location within Vermont Location within the United States
- Location: VT 73, Rochester, Vermont
- Coordinates: 43°51′23″N 72°49′21″W
- Area: 38 acres (15 ha)
- Built: 1840
- Architectural style: Queen Anne
- MPS: Agricultural Resources of Vermont MPS
- NRHP reference No.: 01001284
- Added to NRHP: November 29, 2001

The Ezekiel Emerson Farm, also known as Apple Hill Farm, is a historic farm property at 936 Brandon Mountain Road (Vermont Route 73) in Rochester, Vermont. Occupying 38 acres (15 ha) (out of an original 55 acres (22 ha)), the farm includes a mid-19th century bank barn and a c. 1920-1940 milk barn that are both well-preserved examples of period agricultural buildings. The house includes a fine example of a Late Victorian porch. The property was listed on the National Register of Historic Places in 2001.

== Description and history ==
The Ezekiel Emerson Farm is located along Vermont Route 73 (Brandon Mountain Road) in a rural area of western Rochester, on the eastern slope of Vermont's Green Mountains. Most of the farm property is located north of the road, although there is a strip of land, traditionally used for haying, between the road and the West Branch White River, which it roughly parallels in this area. The farm buildings are clustered on the north side of the road, with open fields to the east, and formerly open hillside sloping up to higher fields. The farmhouse, near the western end of the complex, is a roughly cruciform 1 1/2-story wood-frame structure built about 1840, and modified in the late 1890s. Its most distinctive feature is an elaborately decorated wraparound porch that extends across the front and along one side.

Attached to the northwest corner of the house is a former horse and carriage barn, now serving as a garage and shed. To the east of the house stands a large bank barn, with a gabled roof and board-and-batten siding. Near the barn, but facing toward the house, is a small single-story wood frame milking house, covered by a shed roof and now repurposed into a toolshed. The foundations of an old potato storage building are located behind the barn.

The farm's origins appear to be in land speculation by a wealthy Rochester landowner, Ephraim Briggs, who apparently had the house built about 1840 on speculation, and sold a 42-acre (17 ha) parcel in 1842 to Solomon Nott. Nott sold the property to the town in 1856, who rented, and then sold, the property to members of the Emerson family. The Emersons operated a small-scale dairy cow operation on the property, also producing grain crops and potatoes. It is believed that Ezekiel built the barn in the 1870s, after he acquired title to the property from other family members. Emerson later sold water rights along the White River that were used to build a hydroelectric power plant, providing power to Rochester for the first time. The financial rewards that flowed from this arrangement likely made possible a significant enlargement of the house. After being sold by Emerson in 1907, it went through a number of owners, primarily involved in dairying, before eventually being converted to a bed and breakfast in the 1990s. As of 2016, it is in use as a horse farm.

== See also ==
- National Register of Historic Places listings in Windsor County, Vermont
