= Emerson Place =

Historic house in New York, United States

- U.S. National Register of Historic Places
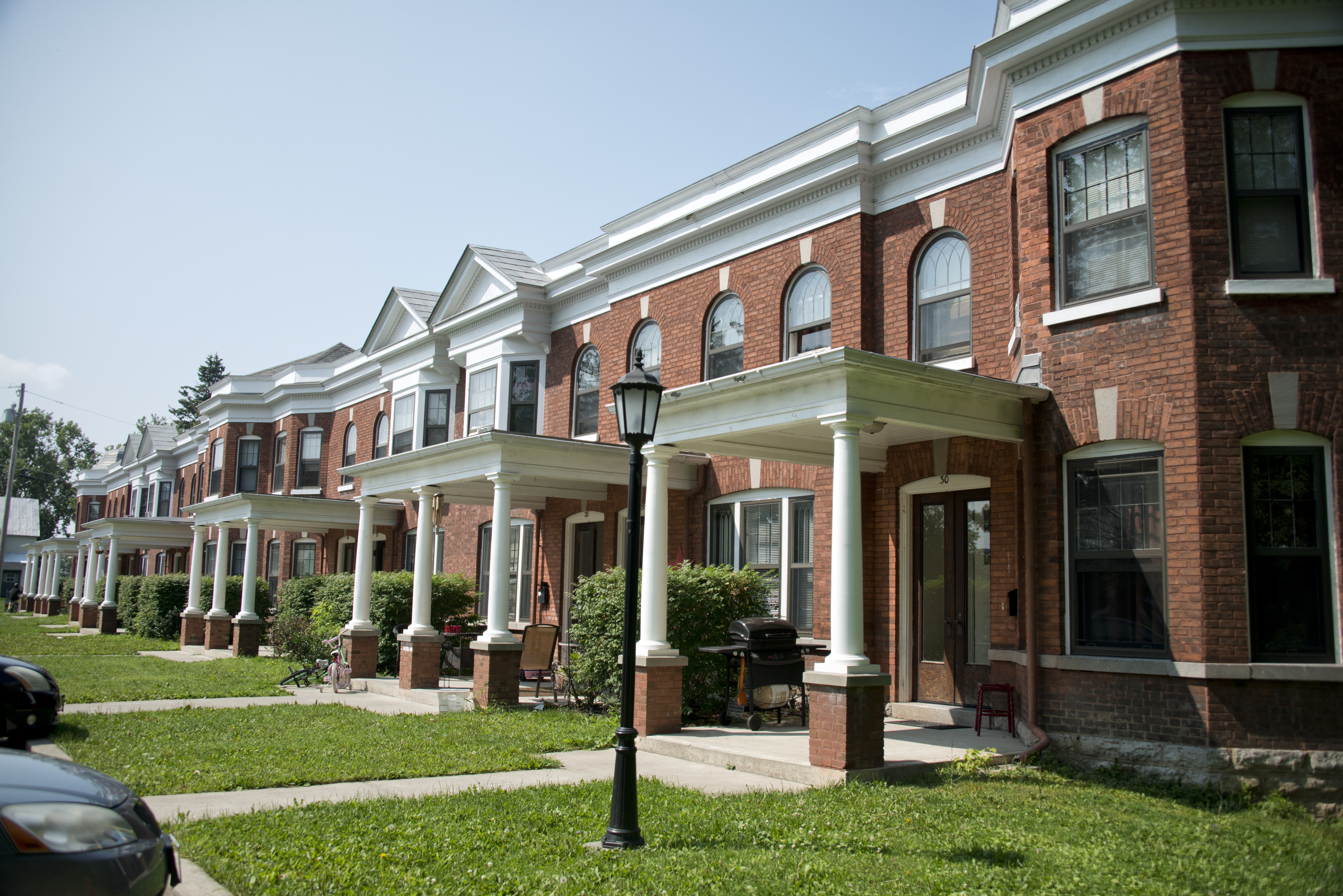

- Location within New York Location within the United States
- Location: 20-30 Emerson Place, Watertown, New York
- Coordinates: 43°58′24″N 75°53′59″W
- Area: 1.9 acres (0.77 ha)
- Built: 1904
- Architectural style: Colonial Revival
- NRHP reference No.: 03000241
- Added to NRHP: April 18, 2003

Emerson Place is a historic townhouse complex located at Watertown in Jefferson County, New York. It was built in 1904 and is a two-story, flat-roofed, brick, nearly symmetrical set of eleven units in the Colonial Revival style. The long facade of the structure is articulated by a series of 3 two-story, projecting, three-sided bay windows; one at each end and a larger one near the center.

It was listed on the National Register of Historic Places in 2003.
