= Emerson House (Haverhill, Massachusetts) =

Historic house in Massachusetts, United States

- U.S. National Register of Historic Places
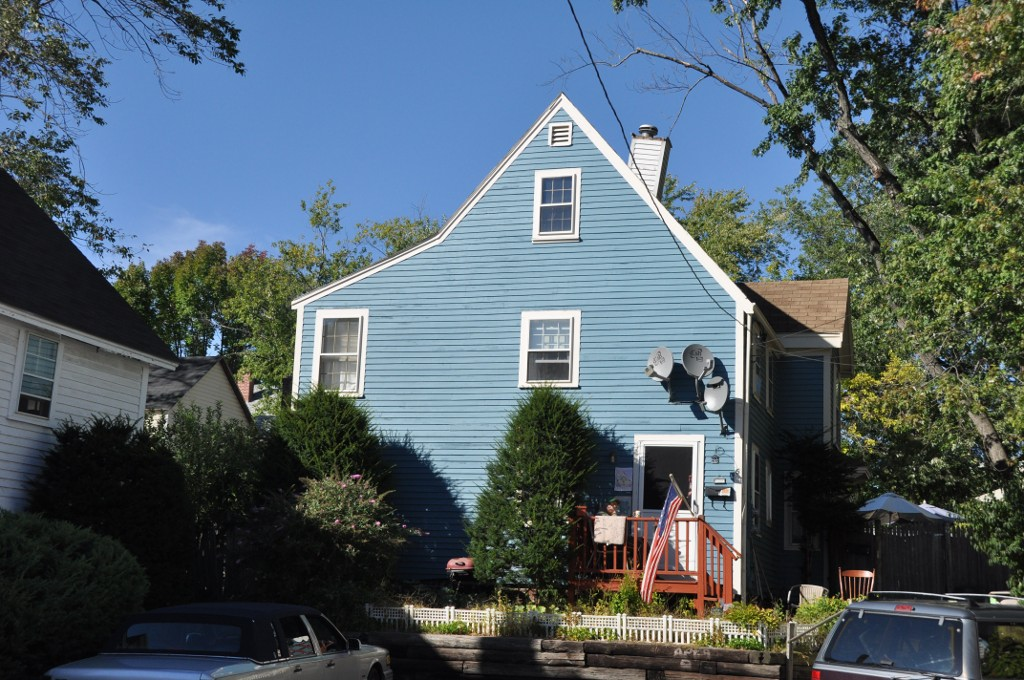

- Location within Massachusetts Location within the United States
- Location: 5–9 Pentucket Street, Haverhill, Massachusetts
- Coordinates: 42°46′44″N 71°4′47″W
- Built: 1730
- Architectural style: Colonial
- MPS: First Period Buildings of Eastern Massachusetts TR
- NRHP reference No.: 90000229
- Added to NRHP: March 9, 1990

The Emerson House is a historic late First Period house in Haverhill, Massachusetts. The oldest part of this 2 1/2-story wood-frame house was built c. 1730, and contains construction features characteristic of the transition between First and Second Period methods. The first part built was the central chimney with the right front rooms, which were followed later by the left side rooms, and then a rear leanto section. The left side was probably built by Nehemiah Emerson, who bought the house in 1787. The house was originally located at the corner of Winter and Pecker Streets, and was moved to its present location in the 1850s. It still retains elements of original Federal period styling.

The house was listed on the National Register of Historic Places in 1990.

== See also ==
- National Register of Historic Places listings in Essex County, Massachusetts
