= Timeline of Watertown, New York =

Historical population
Year	Pop.	±% p.a.
1870	9,336	—
1880	10,697	+1.37%
1890	14,725	+3.25%
1900	21,696	+3.95%
1910	26,730	+2.11%
1920	31,285	+1.59%
1930	32,205	+0.29%
1940	33,385	+0.36%
1950	34,350	+0.29%
1960	33,306	−0.31%
1970	30,787	−0.78%
1980	27,861	−0.99%
1990	29,429	+0.55%
2000	26,705	−0.97%
2010	27,023	+0.12%
2020	24,685	−0.90%
U.S. Decennial Census

The history of Watertown, a city in Jefferson County, New York, can be traced to the purchase of Upstate New York by Alexander Macomb, leading to a settlement east of Lake Ontario in the early 19th century. The area had seen human occupation since at least the second glacial period, but significant change into what is now known as Watertown did not occur until the beginning of the Machine Age. The city, which was incorporated in 1869, had expanded primarily through trade with Canada. The city destroyed many factories and historical buildings in the 1960s, which began a steady decline in population, from 33,306 in 1960 to 24,685 in 2020, a loss of 26%.

== Prehistory ==
- c.12,000 BP: Ice from the pleistocene period recedes, leaving the area underwater for ≈ 1,000 years.
- c.11,000 BP: Land emerges from underwater.
- Glacial Period: Native Americans follow Caribou into the area and settle.

== 18th century ==
- 1791: Area bought by Alexander Macomb.
- 1796: Area scouted by Benjamin Wright.

== 19th century ==
- March 1800: Houses first built by Pioneers.
- 1801: A Church is built.
- 1802
  - School Built.
  - Hydropower using the fast moving water of the Black River begins.
- 1804: The Postal Station is built.
- 1805: The Public Square is allowed to be used by the public.
- 1816
  - Watertown Incorporated as a Village.
  - First Bank opened.
  - Local Fire Department begins.
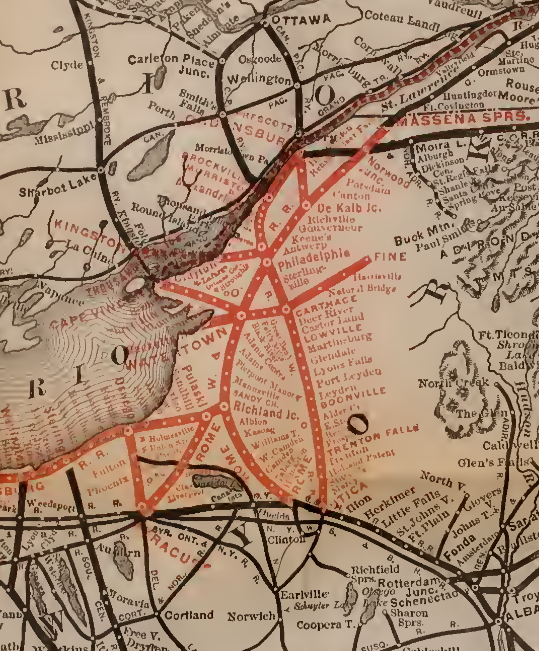
- The Rome, Watertown and Ogdensburg Railroad path, 1889.
  1842: Rome, Watertown and Ogdensburg Railroad built.
- 1847: First Portable steam engine to be made in the United States made in Watertown.
- 1849
  - Safety pin is invented by Walter Hunt of Watertown.
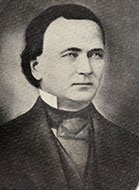
    Walter Hunt. He invented the Safety pin and the first lockstitch sewing machine in 1832.
  - A fire destroys most of the Public Square and surrounding buildings.
- 1850: Paddock Arcade built.
- 1853: Public water system and illuminating gas works installed.
- 1861: Watertown Daily Times begins.
- 1862: Jefferson County Courthouse Complex built.
- 1869
  - City of Watertown Incorporated.
  - YMCA created.
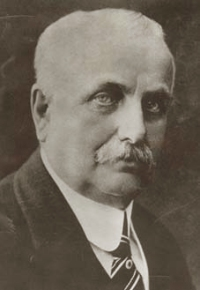
- Frank Winfield Woolworth.
  1878: FW Woolworth comes up with the 5 and dime store in Watertown.
- 1879: Public Telephones installed.
- 1881: Samaritan Medical Center opens in Watertown.
- 1884: Electric lighting system established.
- 1889
  - Saint Paul's Episcopal Church built.
  - Trinity Episcopal Church built.
- 1891: Soldiers and Sailors Monument built.
- 1894: Public Square paved.
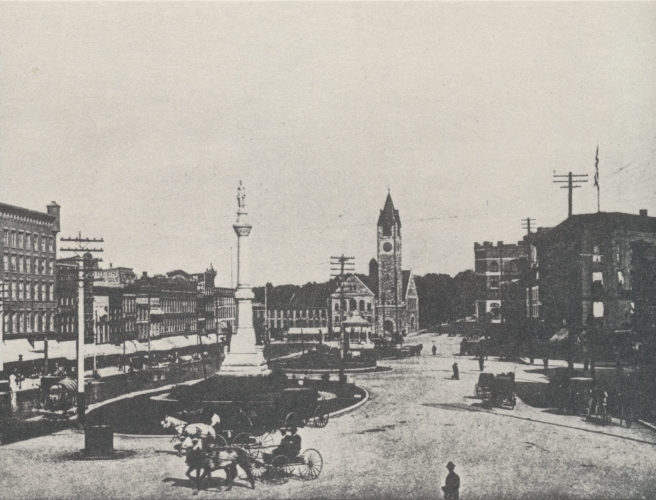
  The Public Square 4 years after it was paved in 1898.

== 20th century ==
- 1903: Roswell P. Flower Memorial Library begins construction.
- 1904
  - Emerson Place built.
  - November 10: Roswell P. Flower Memorial Library completed.
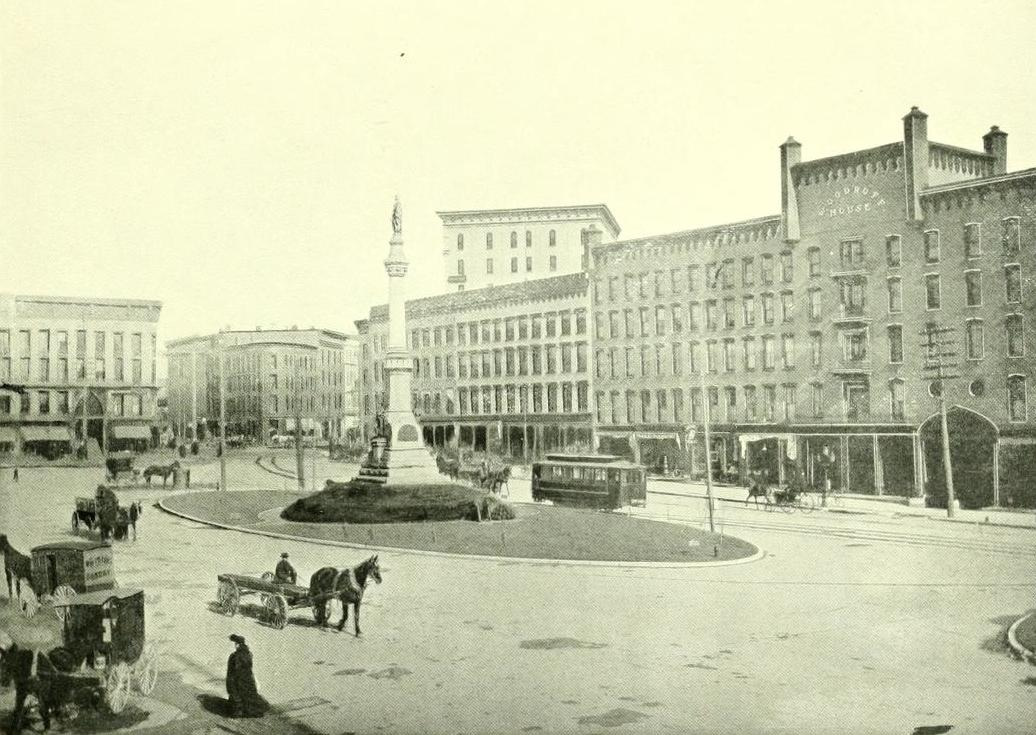
    The Public Square in 1905.
- 1909: Thomas Memorial AME Zion Church built.
- 1912: Parish House built.
- 1914: Watertown Masonic Temple built.
- 1916: Thompson Park officially gifted to Watertown by John C. Thompson.
- 1920: City manager government style begins.
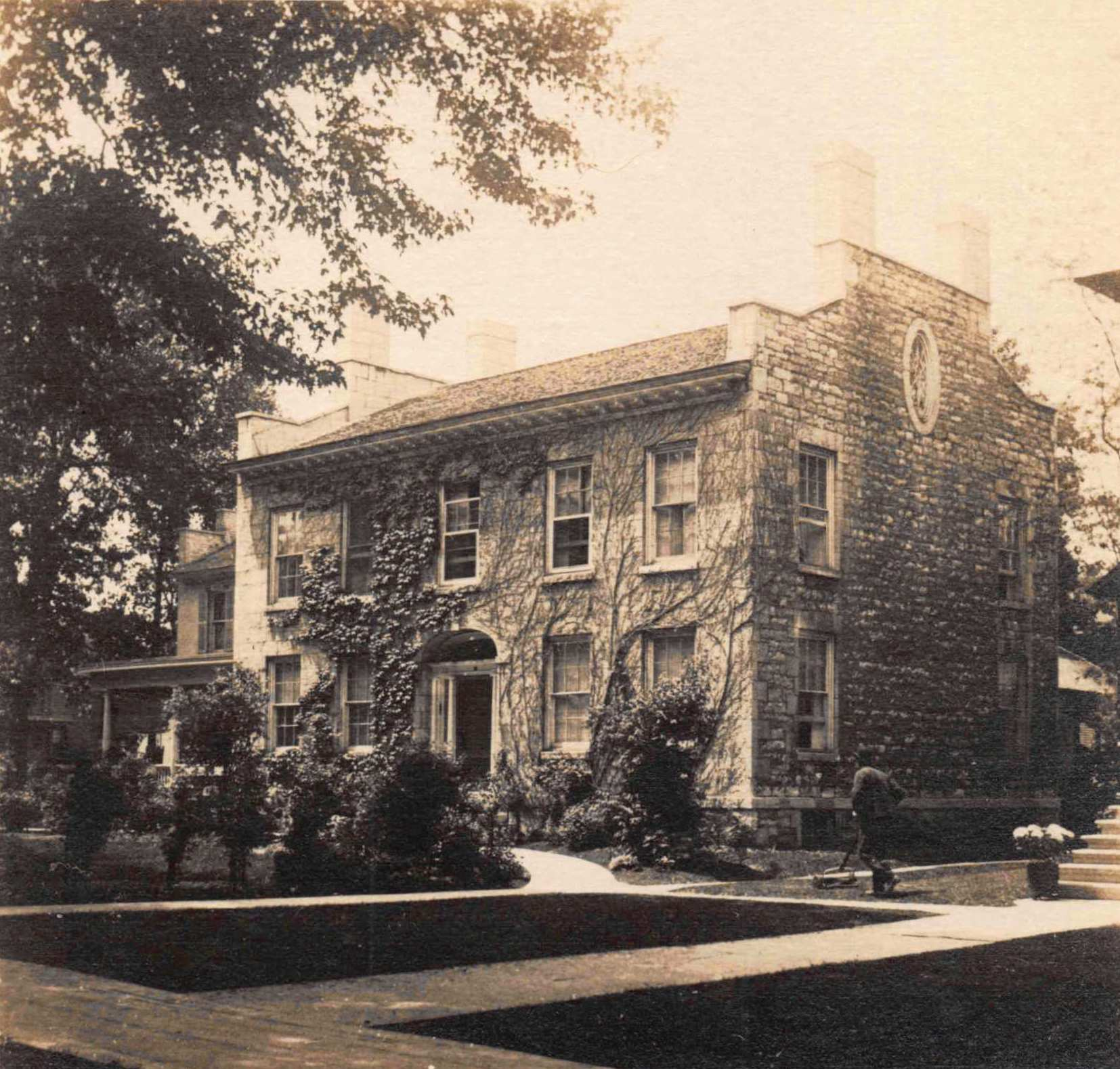
  The Orville Hungerford Home in c. 1920
- 1925: Golf course built.
- 1926: Interurban bus lines spanning 800 miles built.
- 1927
  - Hydro-electric power plant built using the power from the Black River.
  - Airplane taxi service established.
- 1952: Little Trees invented by Watertown resident Julius Sämann.
- 1960: The Fountain in the Public Square is built and dedicated.
- 1970: Construction on the Dulles State Office Building begins.
- 1972: Construction on the Dulles State Office Building finished.

== 21st century ==
- 2006: Public Square Revamp begins.
- 2008: Public Square Revamp completed.
