= Public Square (Watertown, New York) =

- Public Square Historic District
- U.S. National Register of Historic Places
- U.S. Historic district
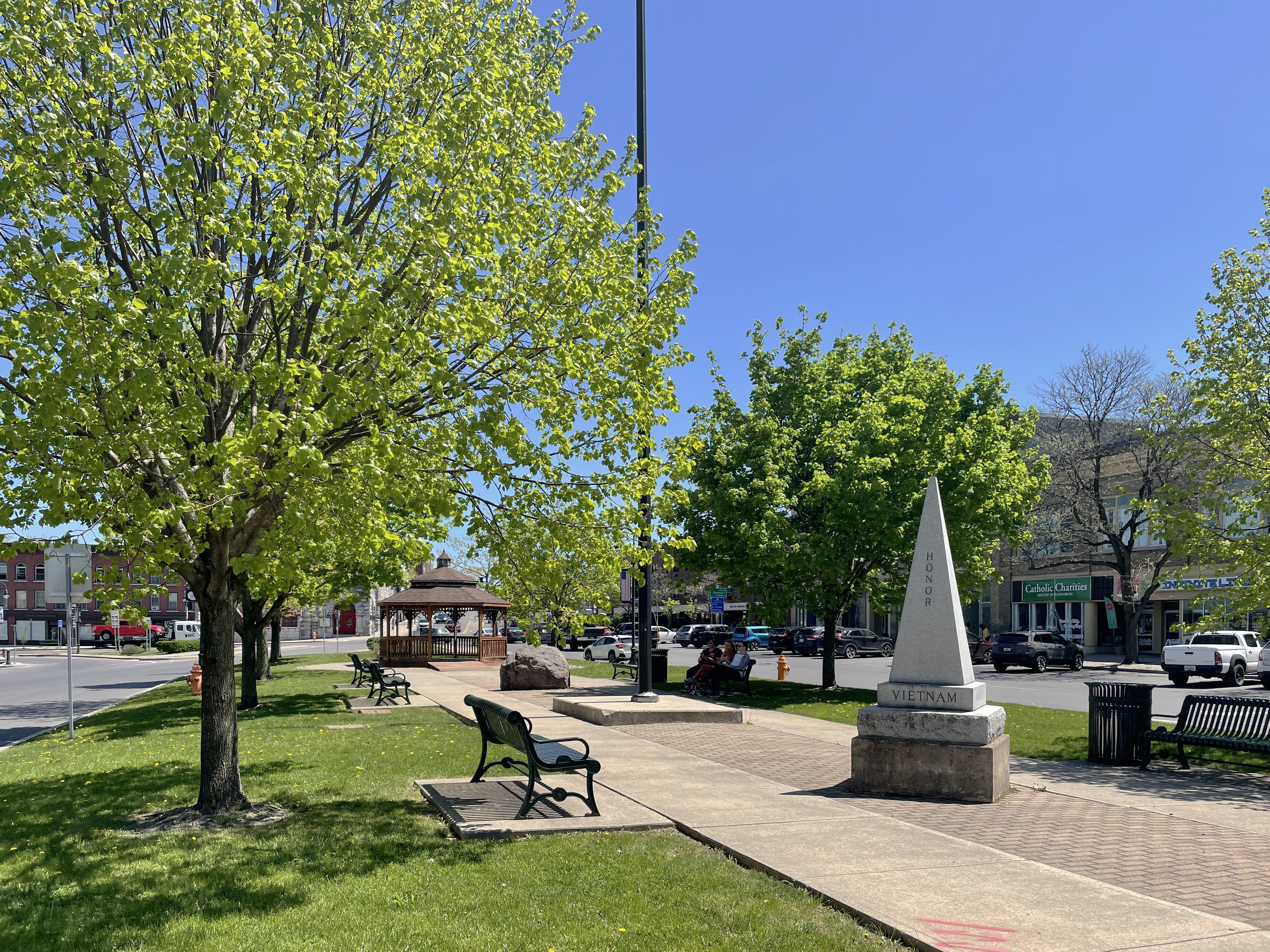
- The Public Square in May 2022.

- Location within New York Location within the United States
- Location: Roughly Court, Arsenal, Washington, Franklin and State Sts., Watertown, New York
- Coordinates: 43°58′29″N 75°54′34″W
- Area: 16 acres (6.5 ha)
- Built: 1805
- Architect: Augustus Saint-Gaudens; Multiple
- Architectural style: Late 19th And 20th Century Revivals, Late Victorian, Art Deco
- NRHP reference No.: 84002409 (original); 16000110 (increase)

Significant dates
- Added to NRHP: September 7, 1984
- Boundary increase: March 22, 2016

The Public Square Historic District is a historic district that serves as an open mall in the center of Watertown, New York, containing 58 buildings, one contributing site, and three contributing objects. The district was listed on the National Register of Historic Places on September 7, 1984.

== Description ==
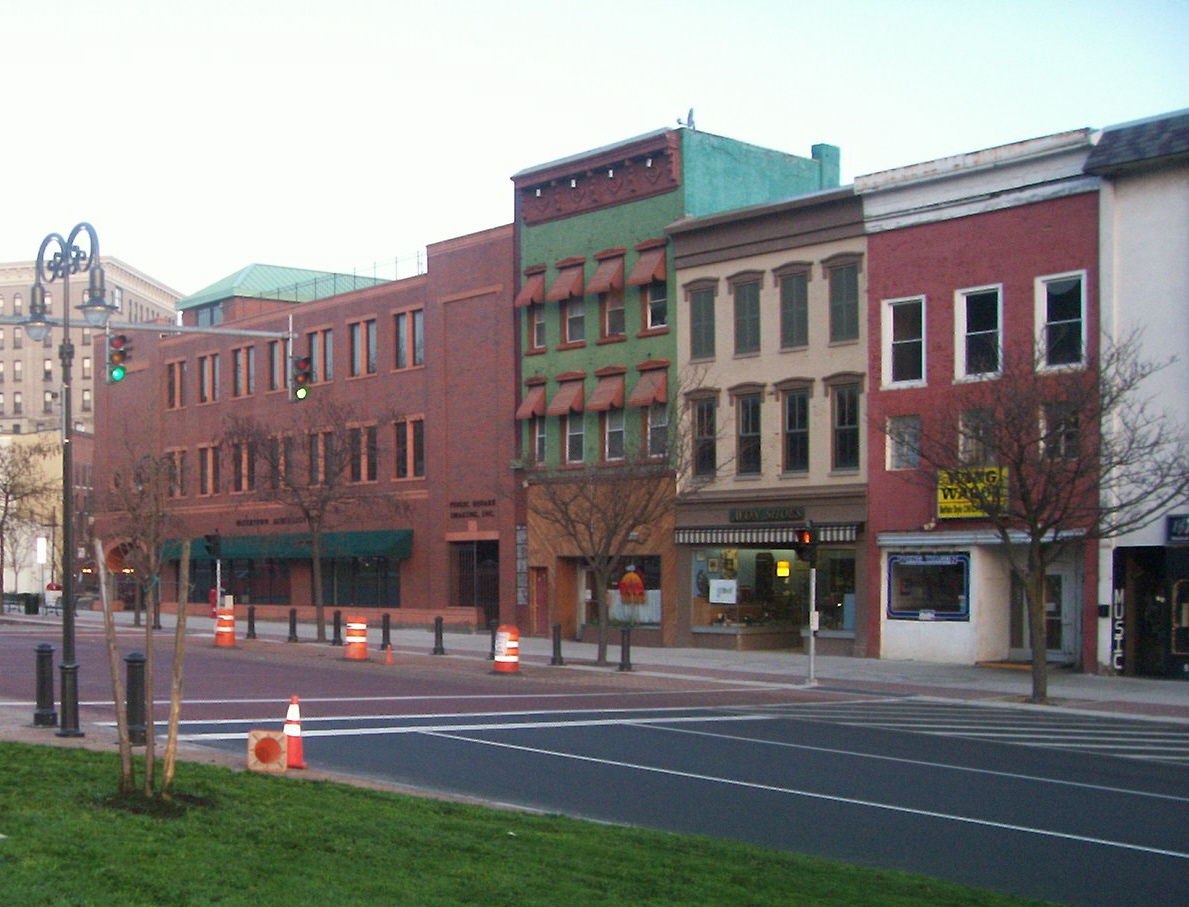
Public Square's North Side. The modern office building on the left blends in with the 19th-century buildings to its right.

The square is rectangular in shape. Buildings line all four sides of the square, while a large oval park sits in its center. A one-way traffic pattern circles the park. Seven of Watertown's main streets (including U.S. Route 11, New York State Route 3, New York State Route 12, and New York State Route 283) intersect at the square, making it a heavy traffic destination for motorists.

While the square boasts some modern architecture, its main character is defined by the numerous 19th- and early 20th-century buildings that still stand. Throughout its buildings, the square is host to a multitude of shops, restaurants, business offices, churches and apartment houses, making it a major shopping and business destination in the city.

== History ==
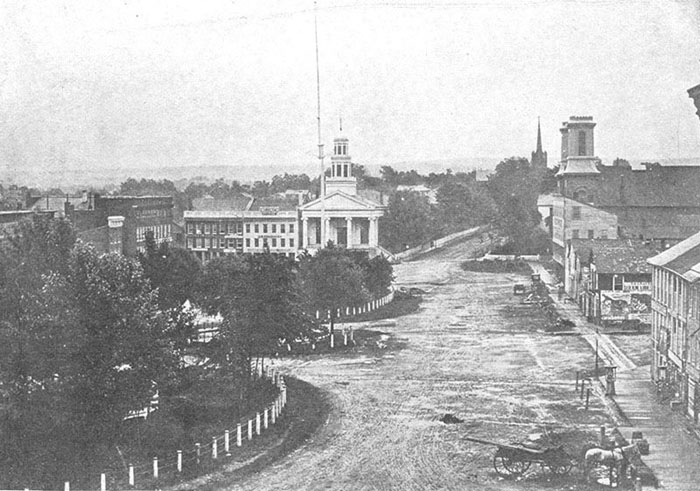
Public Square's East Side circa 1865.

Watertown's first settlers built their homesteads on what is now the square's West End in 1800. In 1805, several settlers donated land for public use which became the basis of the square. This helped to develop the square as Watertown's main business district. The current layout of the square and its surrounding streets developed in those early years.

On May 13, 1849, a fire started inside the American Hotel, killing one. Most of Public Square and buildings on three adjacent streets were destroyed. The fire destroyed nearly all of the business portion of the city, including three banks, post office, three printing offices, two hotels, and thirty stores. The square was immediately rebuilt for $250,000 (Now $9,675,000). Several buildings erected during the rebuilding still stand. In the rebuilding of the 1850s, the city created three parks at the square's center, with a fountain inside the center park. During Watertown's industrial boom in the late 19th and early 20th centuries, Public Square became the heart of Watertown's retail, business and social life. In the 1950s, the three parks in the square's center were combined into one large park.

The Soldiers and Sailors Monument was added in 1891.

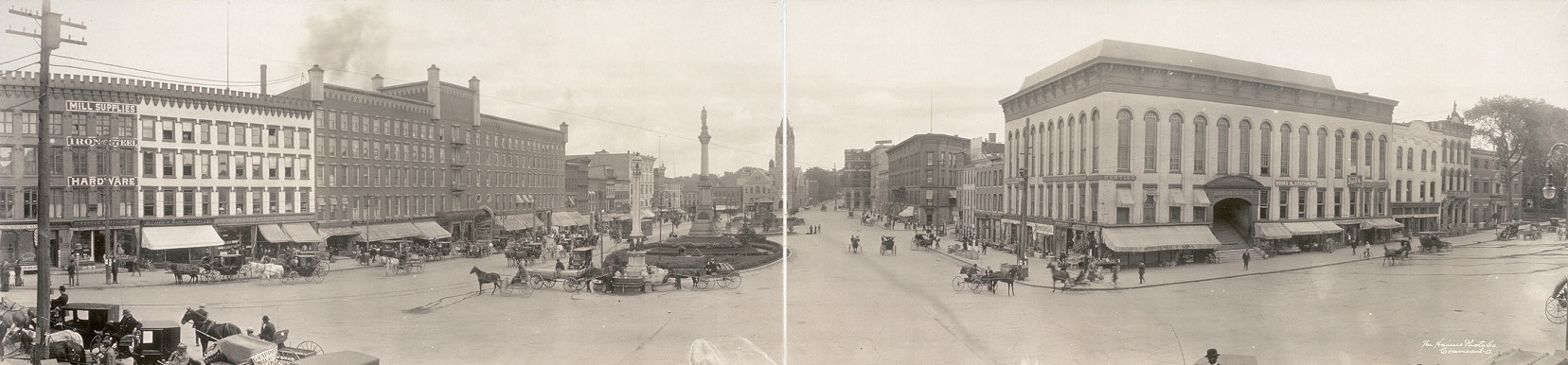
A panoramic view of Public Square circa 1909.

The square's retail and business dominance started declining in the latter half of the 20th century. Urban renewal policies during the 1960s and 1970s resulted in the demolition of some of the square's historic structures. Declining industry hurt Watertown's once prospering economy. Although nearby the Fort Drum military reservation expanded in the 1980s and brought growth to the Watertown, modern shopping malls and retail chains built on the city's west side drew business away from the square. Public Square's days as the city's main retail destination were at an end. The square continued its slow decline over the next 20 years.

== Today ==
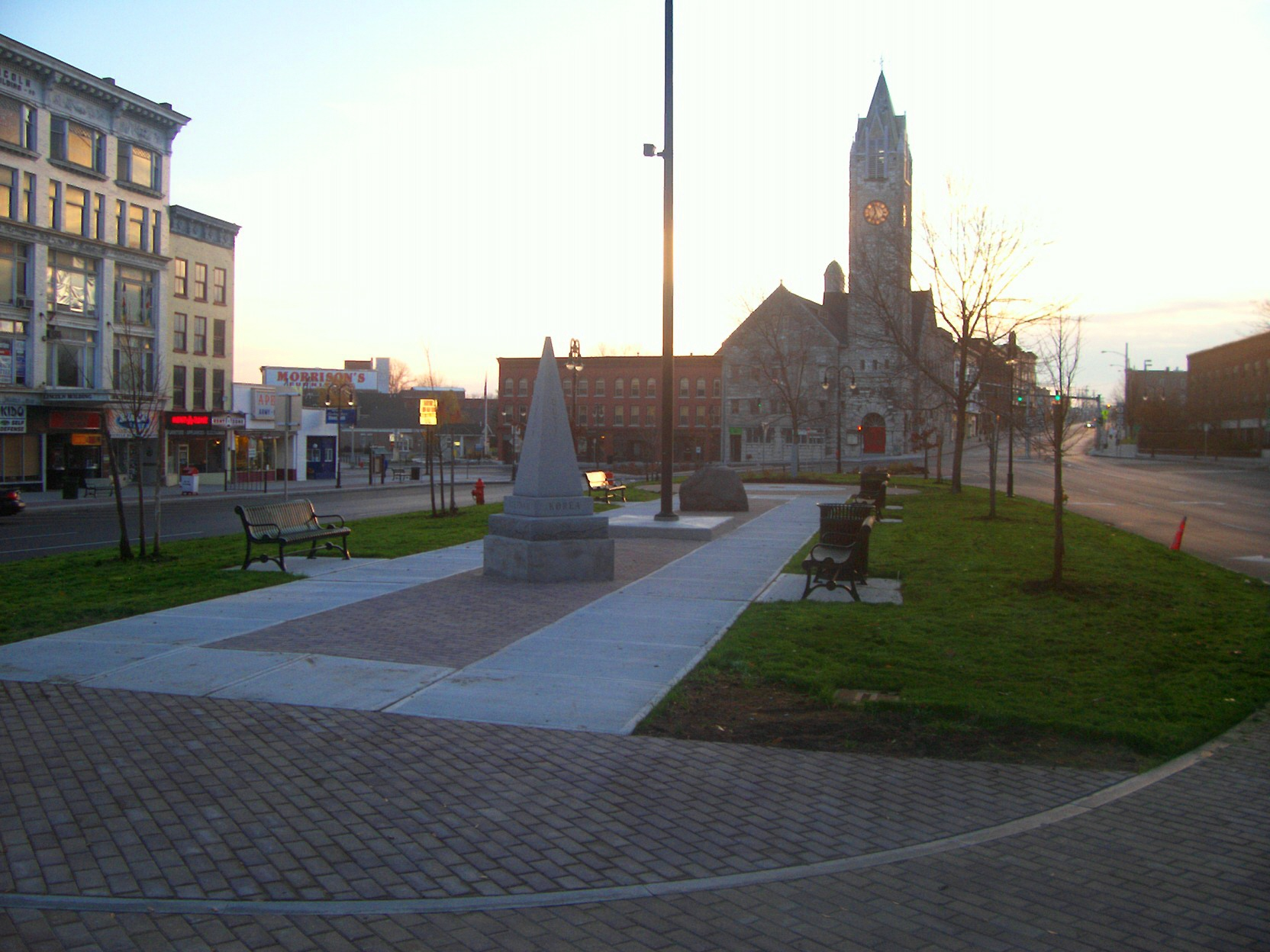
New landscaping and brickwork adorn Public Square Park after the completion of the multimillion-dollar renovation project in 2008.

The beginning of the 21st century saw a reversal in attitudes towards Public Square. With a resurgence of pride in the square and its role in Watertown's history, civic and business leaders have taken a strong role in its redevelopment. Existing buildings were refurbished and new businesses moved in. Some decaying structures beyond repair were demolished. In 2006, the new economic development was coupled with a multimillion-dollar streetscape project to reinforce the square's infrastructure, as well as beautify its roads, walkways and landscaping. This project was completed in November, 2008.

== Public Square notables ==
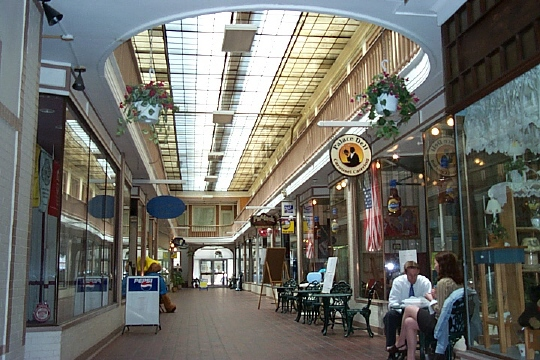
The Paddock Arcade

Public Square has been the site of many notable people, buildings and inventions.

- Noted sculptor Augustus Saint-Gaudens designed the monument to New York Governor Roswell P. Flower in 1902. It is the visual focal point of lower Washington Street.
- Public Square is home to the Paddock Arcade. Built in 1850, the Arcade boasts to be the oldest continuously operating covered mall in the United States. It is listed separately on the National Register of Historic Places.
- Abolitionist Frederick Douglass spoke at Washington Hall and was a guest at the square's renowned Woodruff Hotel in the 1850s. He is noted for insisting on using the front entrance and eating in the hotel's public dining room. Worried about local prejudices, the hotel managers had wanted him to use a rear entrance and stay away from the public areas.
- Frank Winfield Woolworth worked as a clerk in Smith and Moore's department store on Public Square in the 1870s. He came up with the idea to set up a table of discount merchandise and fix the price of the items at five and ten cents apiece. So successful were the sales that he was inspired to start his own store based on the same idea. He opened his first store in Utica, NY, starting the Woolworths chain of department stores.
- Julius Sämann invented the Little Trees car air freshener in the Electric Building on Public Square in the 1950s. These car air fresheners resemble small pine trees and hang from an automobile's rearview mirror, and are known worldwide. Car Freshner Corporation maintains its corporate headquarters and a manufacturing plant in Watertown, while it has expanded to include factories in several other cities around the United States.

== See also ==
- National Register of Historic Places listings in Jefferson County, New York
- F. W. Woolworth Building
