= Sämann =

Sämann (German for "sower") is a German surname. Notable people with the surname include:

- Gerlinde Sämann (born 1969), German soprano
- Julius Sämann (1911–1999), German-Canadian perfumist and chemist
