= Uffenheim =

- Town
- Coat of arms

- Location of Uffenheim within Neustadt a.d.Aisch-Bad Windsheim district
- Interactive map of Uffenheim
- Location within Germany Location within Bavaria
- Coordinates: 49°31′N 10°15′E
- Country: Germany
- State: Bavaria
- Admin. region: Mittelfranken
- District: Neustadt a.d.Aisch-Bad Windsheim
- Municipal assoc.: Uffenheim
- Subdivisions: 13 Ortsteile

Government
  - Mayor (2020–26): Wolfgang Lampe (SPD)

Area
  - Total: 59.46 km^{2} (22.96 sq mi)
- Elevation: 329 m (1,079 ft)

Population (2025-12-31)
  - Total: 6,497
  - Density: 109.3/km^{2} (283.0/sq mi)
- Time zone: UTC+01:00 (CET)
  - Summer (DST): UTC+02:00 (CEST)
- Postal codes: 97215
- Dialling codes: 09842
- Vehicle registration: NEA, UFF, SEF
- Website: www.uffenheim.de

Uffenheim (German pronunciation: [ˈʊfn̩ˌhaɪm]; East Franconian: Ufni) is a city in the Middle Franconian district of Neustadt (Aisch)-Bad Windsheim, in Bavaria, Germany. It is situated 14 km west of Bad Windsheim, and 36 km southeast of Würzburg.

== Town structure ==
Uffenheim consists of 13 divisions:

- Aspachhof
- Brackenlohr
- Custenlohr
- Hinterpfeinach
- Kleinharbach
- Langensteinach
- Rudolzhofen
- Schafhof
- Uffenheim
- Uttenhofen
- Vorderpfeinach
- Wallmersbach
- Welbhausen (about 400 inhabitants)

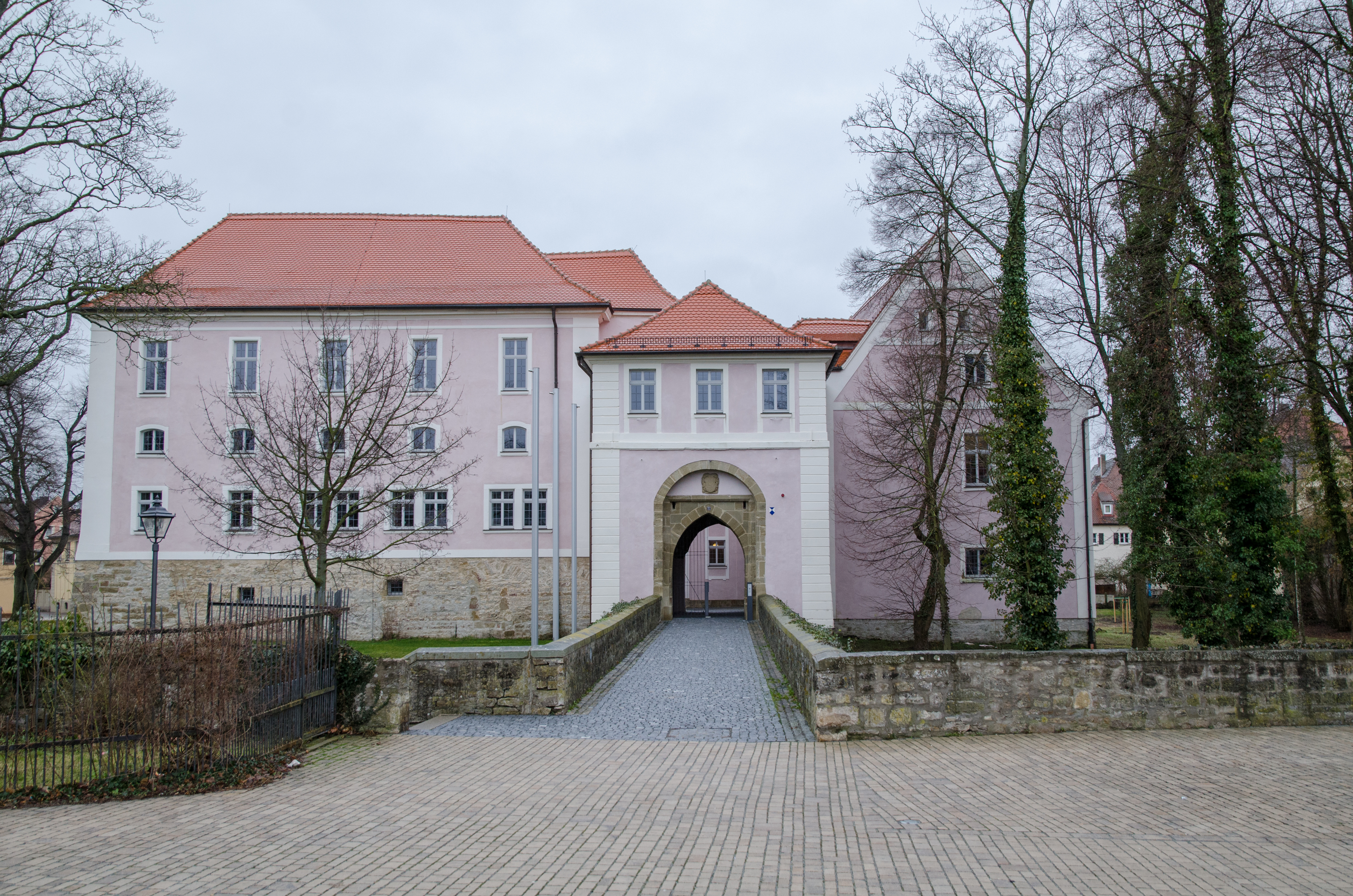
Uffenheim castle

== Personalities ==
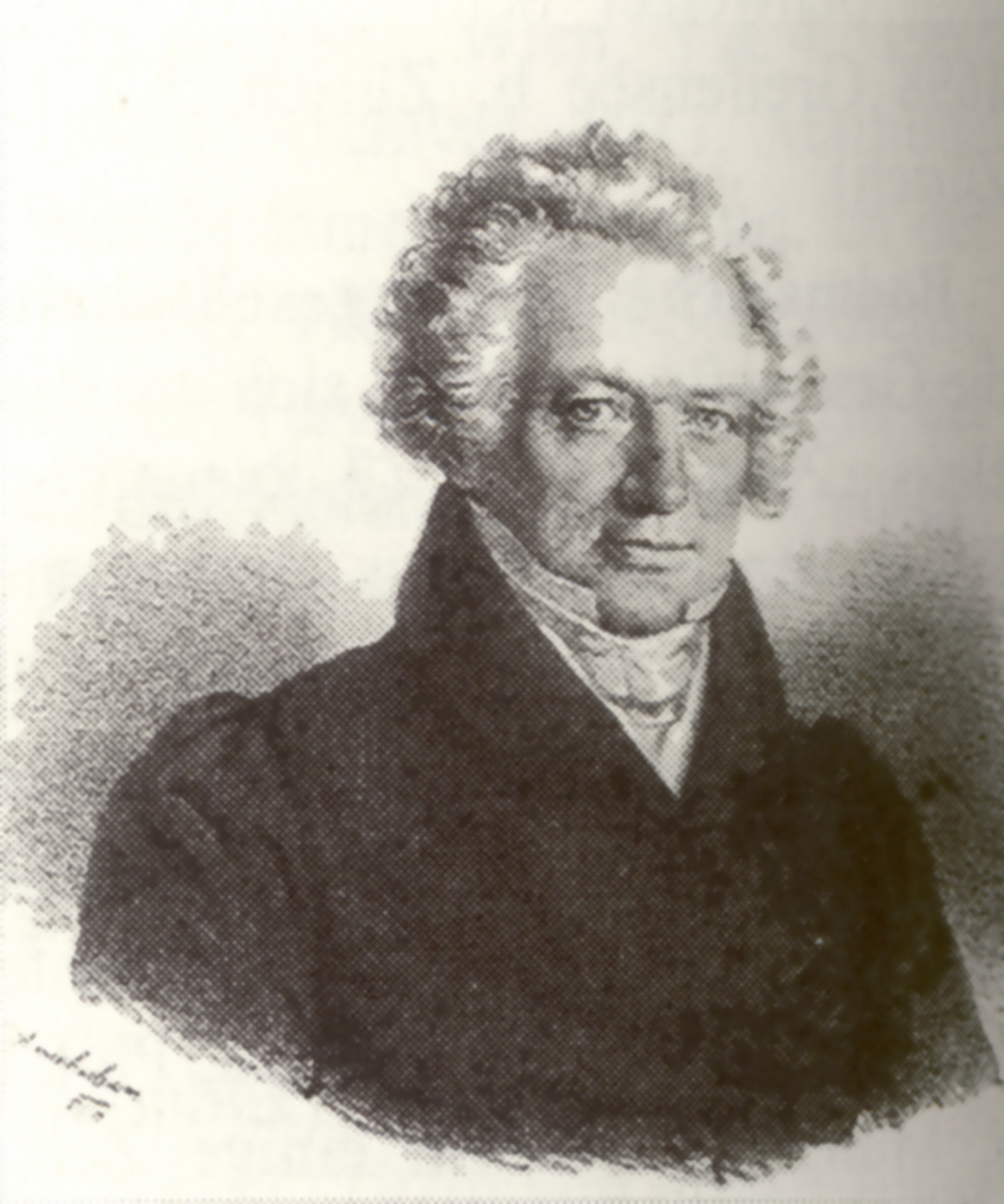
Johann Lukas Boer (1830)

- Johann Lukas Boër, actually Boogers (1751-1835), physician, obstetrician and university lecturer
- Karl Arnold (1853-1929), chemist
- Julius Sämann (1911-1999), perfumer and chemist; inventor of the Little Trees
