= Johann Lucas Boër =

German medical doctor and obstetrician

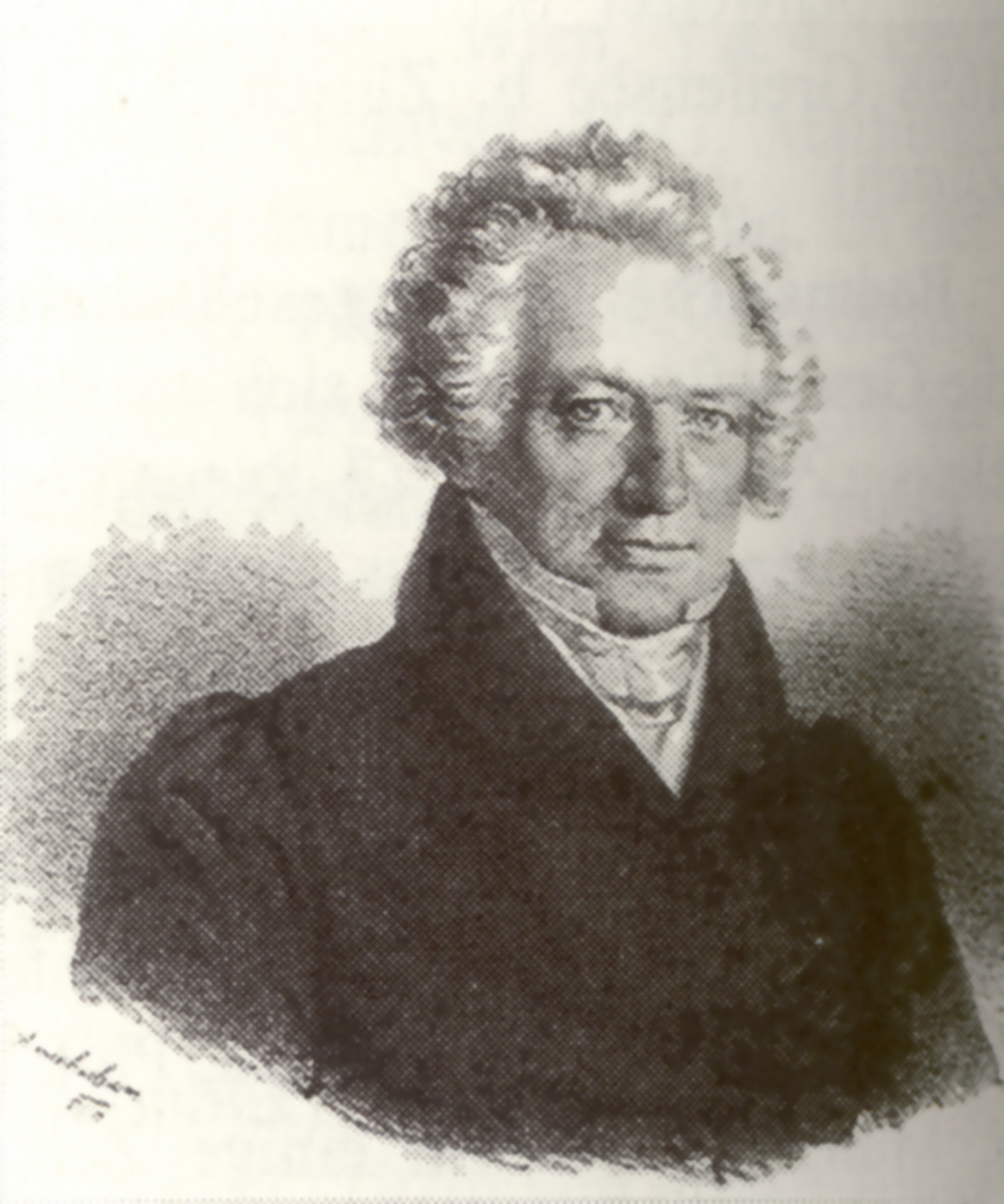
- Johann Lukas Boër, 1830 (by artist Josef Kriehuber)
- Born: 20 April 1751; Uffenheim, Grafschaft Ansbach, Holy Roman Empire
- Died: 19 January 1835 (aged 83); Wien-Alsergrund, Austrian Empire
- Scientific career
- Fields: Obstetrics
- Workplaces: Vienna General Hospital and University of Vienna

Johann Lucas Boër (20 April 1751 in Uffenheim, Grafschaft Ansbach – 19 January 1835 in Alsergrund), originally Johann Lucas Boogers (sometimes spelled Rogers Lucas Johann Boër) was a German medical doctor and obstetrician.

== Professional life ==
Johann Lukas Boogers studied in Würzburg with Carl Caspar von Siebold. He moved to Vienna in 1771 where he became Magister in 1778. The surgeon Anton Josef Rechberger assigned Boogers to obstetrics and he soon worked at the maternity ward in Rechberger's St. Marxer Hospital. Boogers became surgeon of the Orphanage (or Foundling home) in 1784. He attracted the attention of the Emperor Joseph II who influenced him in 1785 to change surname from Boogers to Boër. Kaiser Joseph II arranged for Boër to make a study trip to Holland, England, France and Italy in 1785–88.

Upon returning to Vienna he became Imperial Surgeon to the Emperor and in 1789 director of Vienna General Hospital's charity Maternity Ward. From 1789 to 1822 Boër was assigned the teaching post for practical instruction at the maternity ward. In 1808 he became Ordinary (First) Professor.

In 1794 Boër became doctor of medicine and surgery honoris causa at the University of Vienna. In 1817 he succeeded Rafael Johann Steidele as the teaching chair of theoretical obstetrics at the University of Vienna.

In 1790 the wife of the later Emperor Franz II died during childbirth for which attempts were made to hold him responsible. He was cleared of accusations of any fault or negligence however, and regained the confidence of the Emperor Joseph II.

== Significance and demise ==
Faithful to the philosophy and principles of his mentor Anton Josef Rechberger, Professor Boër represented the conservative trend in obstetrics for which he was an outstanding advocate. He strongly discouraged use of forceps and other instruments and advocated the practice of natural parturition. He did not draw blood or administered drugs to birth-giving women, instead he prescribed nutritious food, fresh air, and exercise. He is considered the founder of obstetrics at the University of Vienna and made it a contemporary centre of modern teachings.

The trend Boër represented was eventually losing favour to an approach emphasizing active intervention by doctors. Opposition forced him to resign in 1822. He left the post discouraged of what was then regarded as an enormous mortality rate at the maternity clinic. He was succeeded by professor Johann Klein who introduced teachings based on the new field of pathological anatomy.

== Private life ==
Johann Lukas Boër married Eleonora Jacquet in 1793. She was daughter of the actor Carl Jacquet and sister to actress Antonie Adamberger. Boër is buried in the Schmelzer Friedhof Cemetery in Vienna.

== Works and legacy ==
- Abhandlungen und Versuche geburtshilflichen Inhalts (Obstetrical dissertations and experiments), 3 volumes, 1791–93
- Sieben Bücher über natürliche Geburtshilfe, (Seven books on natural obstetrics) in Latin 1830, in German 1834
- Rogers Lucas Johann Boër, Abhandlungen und Versuche zur Begrundung einer neuen, einfachen und naturgemässen Geburtshülfe (Dissertations and experiments in support of a new, simple and natural obstetrics [obstetrical approach]) Vienna: von Mösk, 1810
- In 1894 the street Boergasse in Wien-Meidling was named after the famous obstetrician.

== Sources ==
- This article is based on a translation from the German Wikipedia article merged with the smaller English Wikipedia article, on the 2008-06-10. Wiki-links from the German version are kept.
- Carter, K. Codell; Carter, Barbara R. (1 February 2005). Childbed fever. A scientific biography of Ignaz Semmelweis. Transaction Publishers. ISBN 978-1-4128-0467-7.
- Semmelweis, Ignaz (1861). Etiology, Concept and Prophylaxis of Childbed Fever. K. Codell Carter (translator and extensive foreword). University of Wisconsin Press, September 15, 1983. ISBN 0-299-09364-6.

=== Notes ===
==== German sources ====
- R. Hussian: Boers Leben und Wirken, 1838
- Wolfgang Dietrich Heinlein: Johann Lukas Boër, der Begründer der „natürlichen“ Geburtshilfe (1751-1835). Memminger, Würzburg 1935
- E. Vogl: Der Streit um Boër. Dissertation, Wien 1943
- Gabriela Schmidt: Johann Lukas Boër; in Felix Czeike: Historisches Lexikon Wien vol. 1. Kremayr & Scheriau, Wien 1992
