= Hillary Bacon Store (Woolworth's) =

- Formerly listed on the U.S. National Register of Historic Places
- Location: 527 Main St., Evansville, Indiana
- Area: less than one acre
- Built: 1921
- Architect: Shopbell & Company
- Architectural style: Chicago
- MPS: Downtown Evansville MRA
- NRHP reference No.: 82000095

Significant dates
- Added to NRHP: July 1, 1982
- Removed from NRHP: August 24, 1993

Hillary Bacon Store, also known as Woolworth's, was a historic commercial building located in downtown Evansville, Indiana. It was designed by the architecture firm Shopbell & Company and built in 1921. It was in Chicago school style architecture. It was destroyed by fire in 1990.

It was listed on the National Register of Historic Places in 1982 and delisted in 1993.

== See also ==
- List of Woolworth buildings
- National Register of Historic Places listings in Vanderburgh County, Indiana
