= Woolworth Building (San Diego) =

Historic building in San Diego, California, U.S.

Coordinates: 32.71539°N 117.1599°W

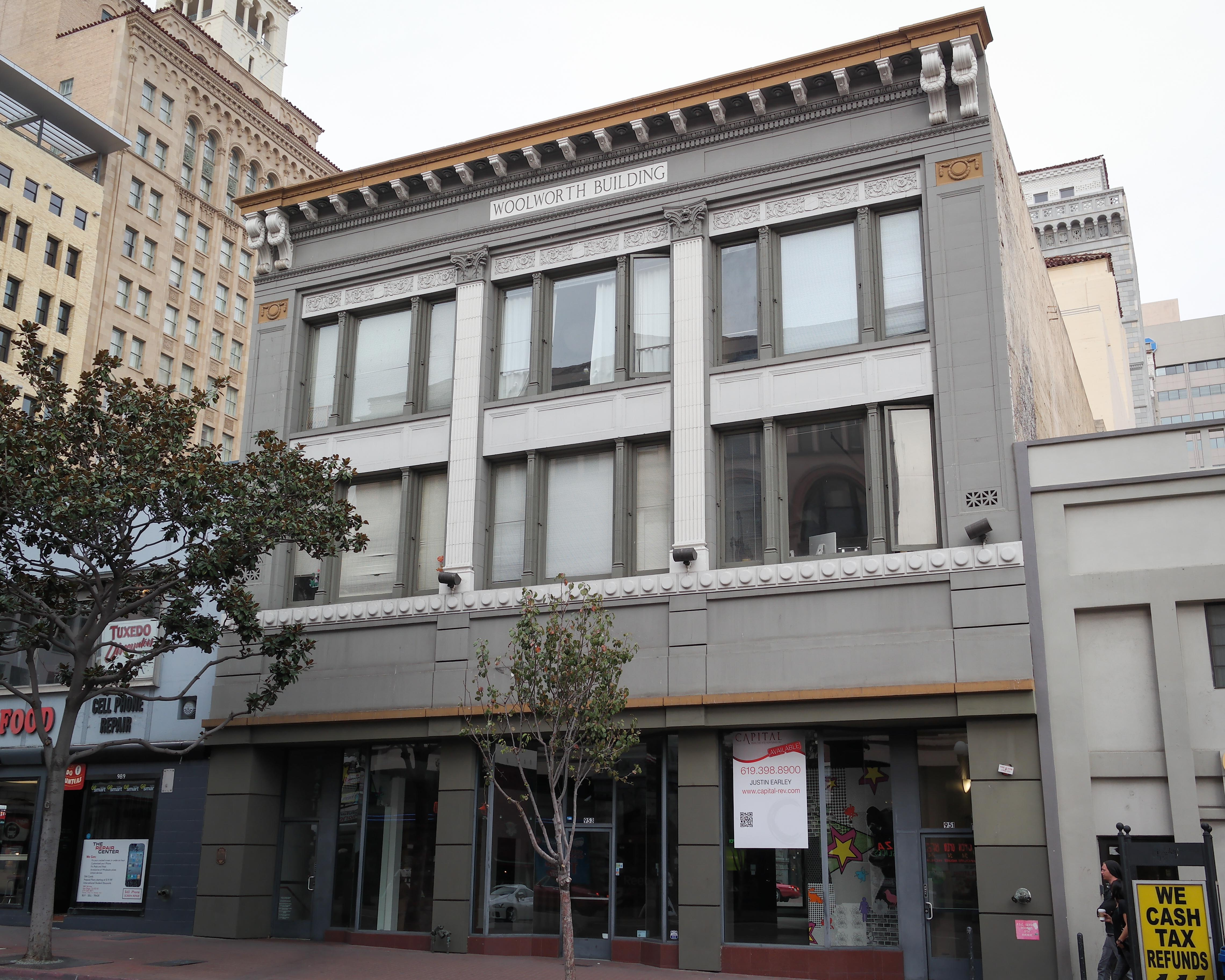
- The Woolworth Building
- Former names: F. W. Woolworth Co.

General information
- Status: Open
- Type: Victorian (originally)
- Location: Gaslamp Quarter, San Diego, United States
- Named for: F. W. Woolworth Co.
- Construction started: 1800s
- Construction stopped: 1885
- Opened: 1886
- Renovated: 1922

Design and construction
- Developer: Woolworth & Co.
- Main contractor: Wheelihan
- Known for: F. W. Woolworth Co.

Other information
- Parking: Street
- Public transit: Metropolitan Transit

The Woolworth Building is an historic structure located at 953 5th Avenue in the Gaslamp Quarter, San Diego, in the U.S. state of California. It was built in 1886, originally as a store for the F. W. Woolworth Company.

== See also ==
- List of Gaslamp Quarter historic buildings
- List of Woolworth buildings
