= F. W. Woolworth Building (Watertown, New York) =

Historic Building in Watertown, New York

Coordinates: 43°58′29.4″N 75°54′40.6″W

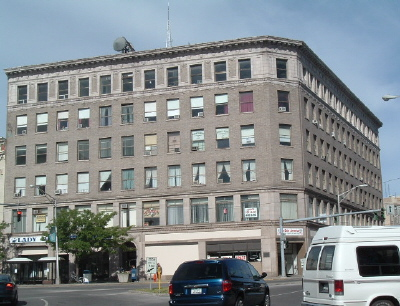
Woolworth Building, 2004

The Woolworth Building is a historic building in Watertown, New York. It is a contributing building in the Public Square Historic District. Plans for the Woolworth Building were begun in 1916 by Frank W. Woolworth, the founder of the Woolworth's chain of department stores.

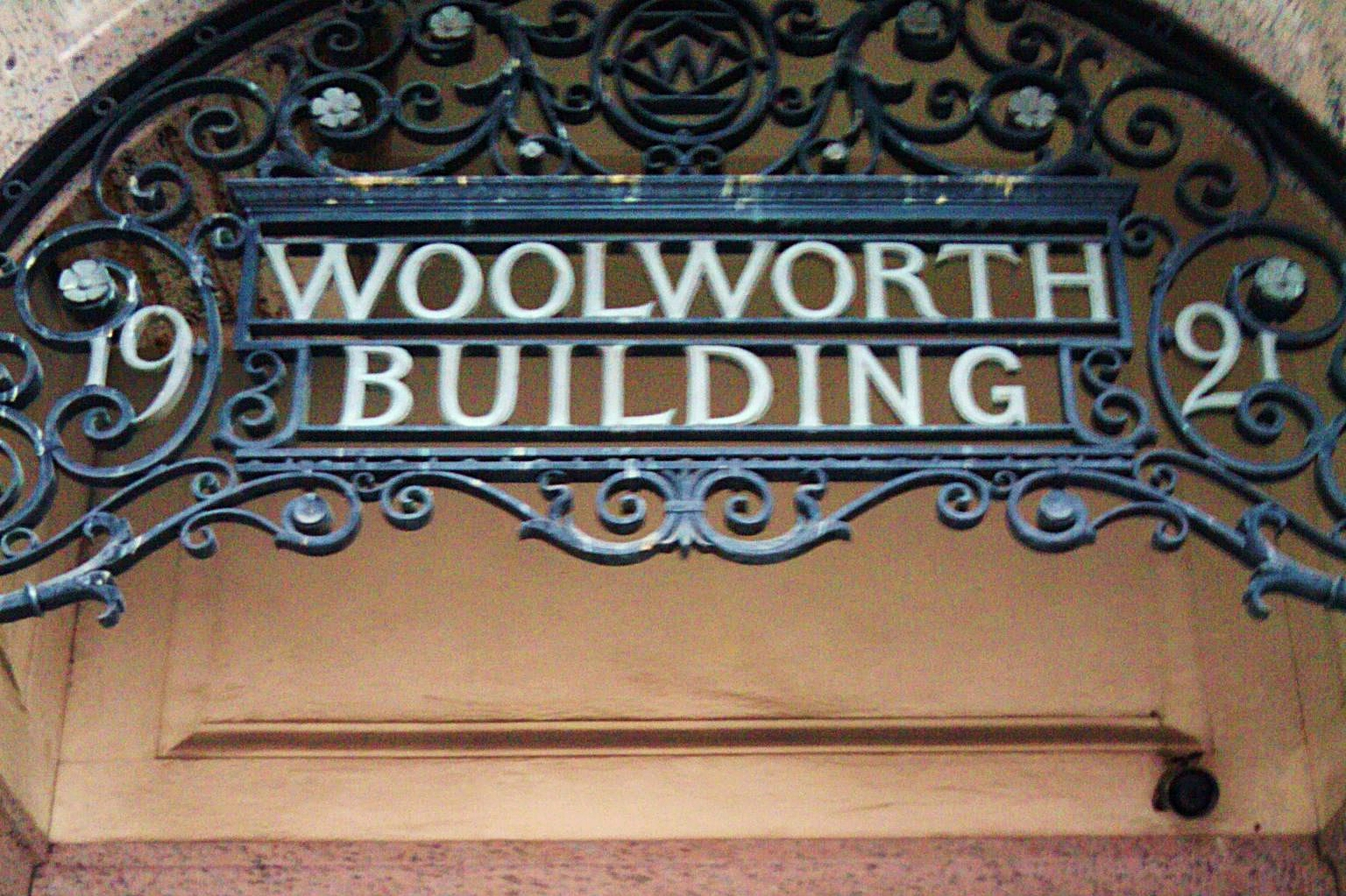
Entrance marker

== History ==
Woolworth began his retail career at the Smith and Moore Dry Goods Store in Watertown in 1873. It was during his time here that he was given the idea of selling fixed price merchandise, which led him to create his successful chain of five and dime department stores in 1879. The Smith and Moore store later became a member of the Woolworth chain.

In 1916, Woolworth purchased the American Building in Watertown, which housed the store in which he began his career. Woolworth planned to demolish this structure, and build a grander building in its place. Woolworth's death in 1919 initially halted these plans, but the Woolworth Corporation eventually decided to go ahead with his plans, and the new six story Woolworth Building opened its doors in 1921.

Woolworth's Department Store occupied the building until 1971, when the store was moved into a modern facility. Many shops occupied the bottom floor of the building in the ensuing years, while the upper five floors remained occupied by various business offices.

== Current status ==
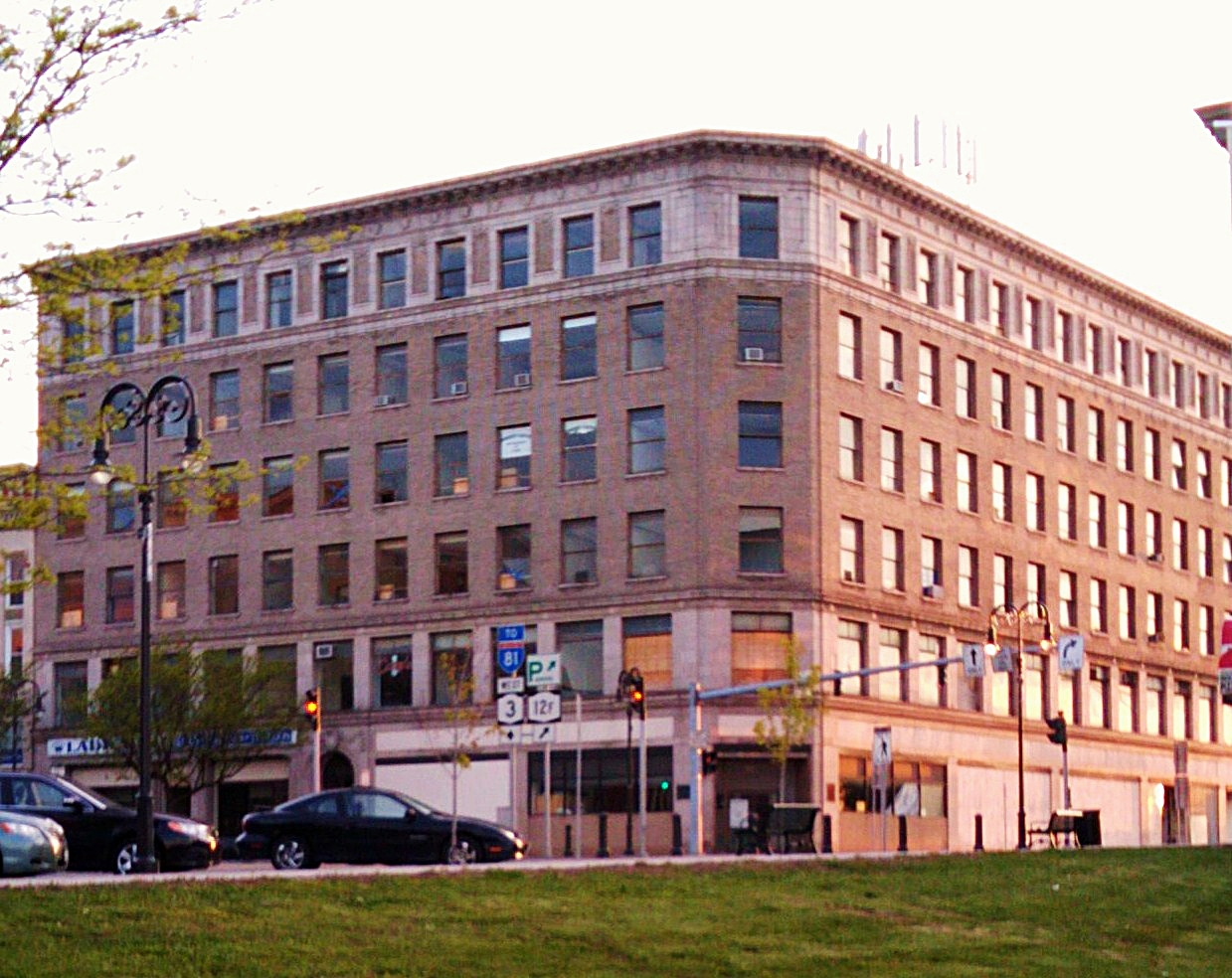
Vacant Woolworth Building, 2010

In 2007, declining occupancy and poor maintenance led to the building's closure. In 2008, a developer purchased the building, with hopes of converting it into a boutique hotel, which would bear the Woolworth name. This plan was abandoned in 2012 in favour of a proposal to transform the upper floors into low-income residential apartments.

As of 2013, the interior was in poor condition. Restoration work began in November 2013 and was expected to continue into 2015. As of early 2015 the restoration is complete and the building is occupied.

The ground floor is to remain commercial space.

== See also ==
- List of Woolworth buildings
