= F. W. Woolworth Company Store (Renton, Washington) =

- F. W. Woolworth Co. Store - Renton
- U.S. National Register of Historic Places
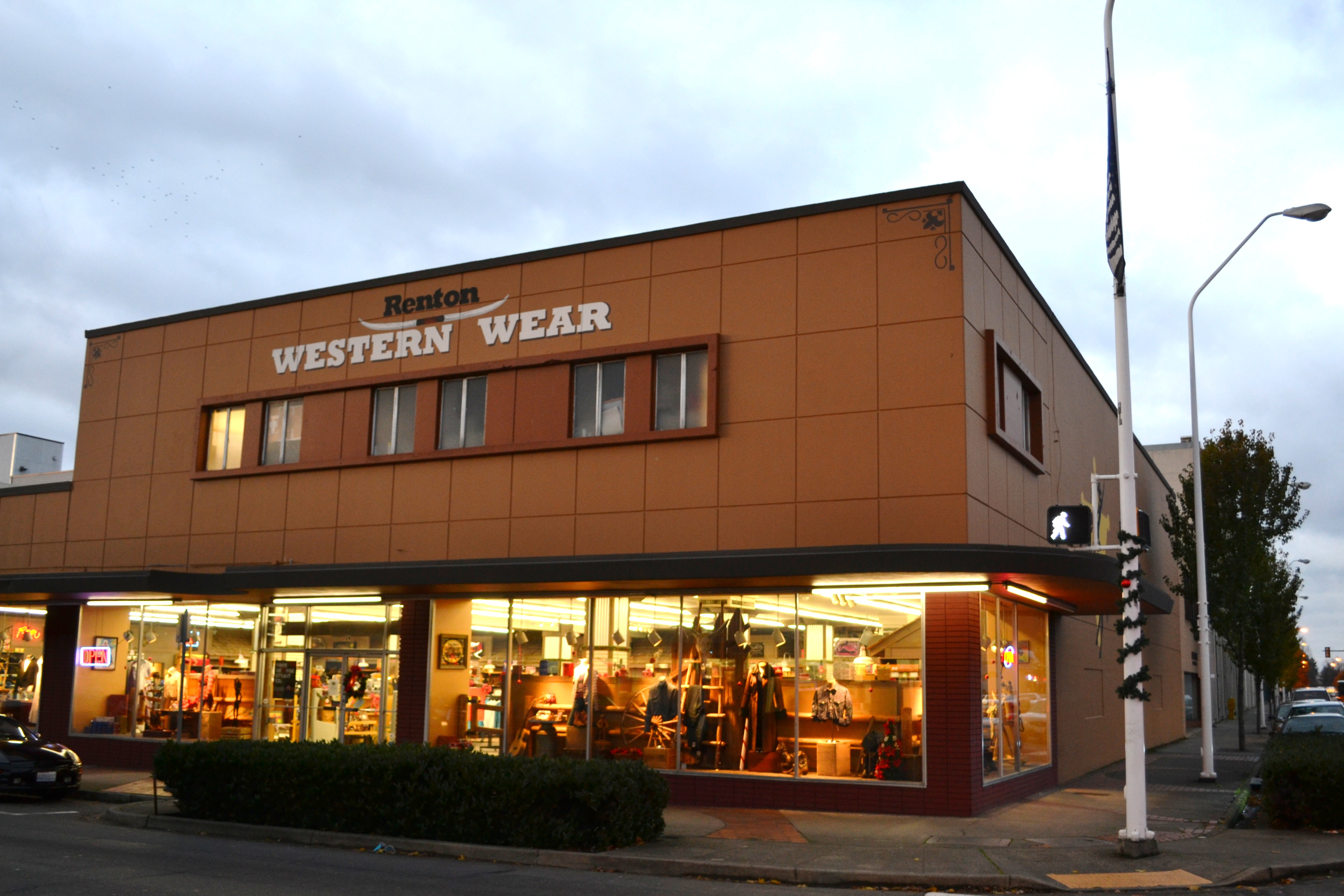
- Woolworth Company Store, now Western Wear

- Location within Washington (state) Location within the United States
- Location: 724 South 3'd Street, Renton, Washington
- Coordinates: 47°28′47.49″N 122°12′25.21″W
- Built: 1954
- Built by: Riley Pleas Inc.
- Architectural style: International Style (architecture)
- NRHP reference No.: 15000880
- Added to NRHP: October 23, 2015

The F. W. Woolworth Company Store Renton is a commercial building in Renton, Washington. Built in 1954, it was listed in the National Register of Historic Places in 2015 for its direct association with growth and development of downtown Renton, and for its connection to the national five-and dime chain store, F.W. Woolworth Company. After the Woolworth's closed, the building housed Renton Western Wear from 1976 until its brick-and-mortar business ceased operations in 2013.

== History ==
The Woolworth Company was one of the original pioneers of the five-and-dime store. The Woolworth Store in Renton was the first store in the Northwest to feature a 100% self-service business model. At its opening, which coincided with the F. W. Woolworth Company's diamond jubilee, the open shopping area on the first floor was 6000 sf. An employee lounge, conference room, and offices were on the second floor. The company closed the store between 1973 and 1974.

The Woolworth Store in Renton was a two-story building that was combined with an adjacent one-story building in 1975.

King County's historic preservation program awarded the restored building the John D. Spellman Award for historic preservation in 2016.

== See also ==
- List of Woolworth buildings
