= F. W. Woolworth Building (Kansas City, Missouri) =

- F.W. Woolworth Building
- U.S. National Register of Historic Places
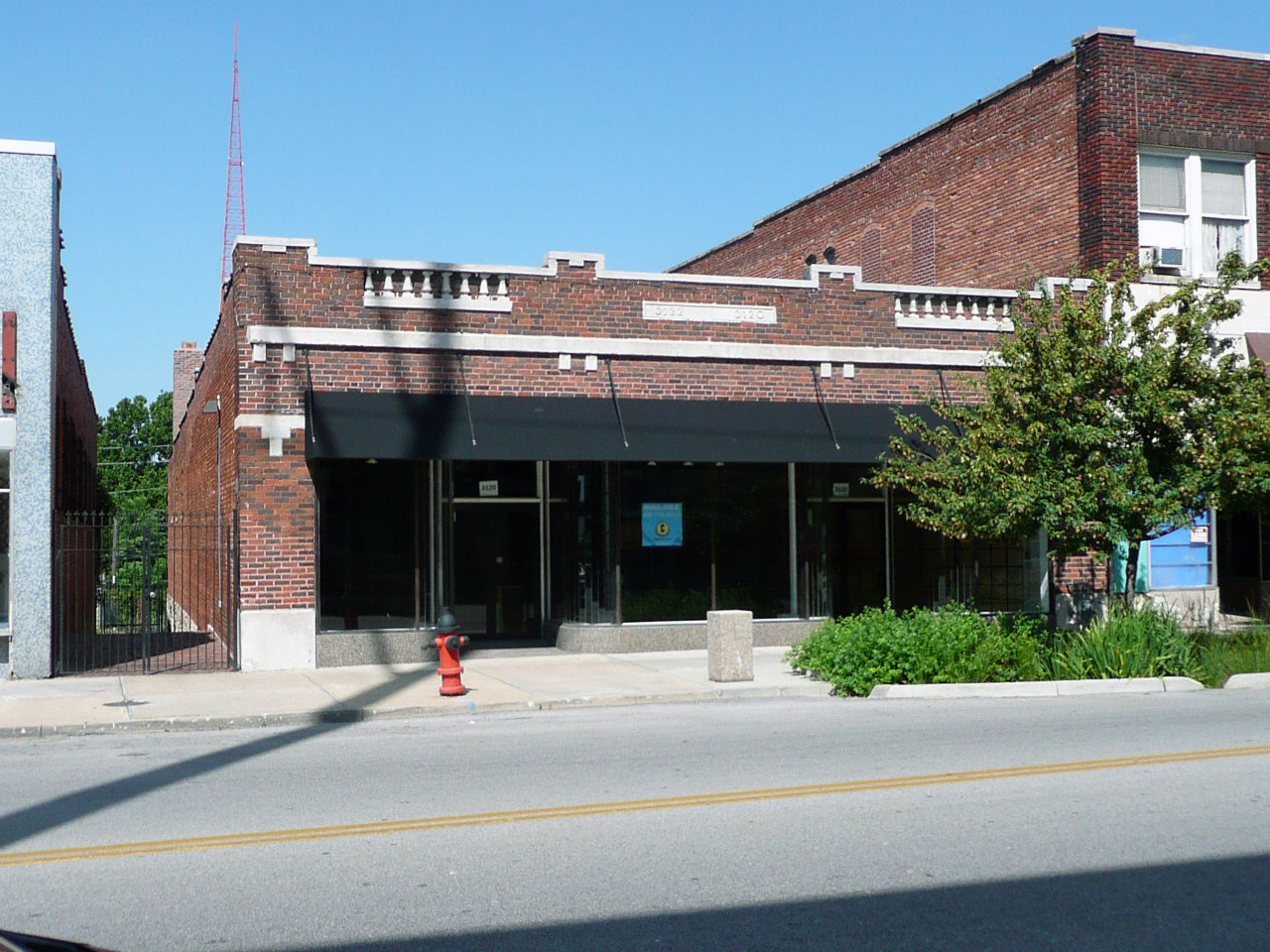

- Location within Missouri Location within the United States
- Location: 3120-3122 Troost Ave, Kansas City, Missouri
- Coordinates: 39.071179°N 94.571643°W
- Built: 1928
- NRHP reference No.: 05000372
- Added to NRHP: 2005-06-05

The F.W. Woolworth Building is a historic department store building located in Kansas City, Missouri that served as a retail location for the F. W. Woolworth Company from 1928 until 1964. The one-story building includes a balustrade parapet and Moderne storefront.

== See also ==
- List of Woolworth buildings
- National Register of Historic Places listings in Jackson County, Missouri: Downtown Kansas City
