= List of Woolworth buildings =

Buildings related to the F. W. Woolworth Company and the Woolworth family.

== List ==
Individually notable buildings by state and city
Building	Image	Location	Built	Note
Hanniger-Johnson Building		Bisbee, Arizona; 31°26′30″N 109°54′58″W	1907	Not built for Woolworth, but best known as the local outlet of the retailer. Owned by the same owner since 1994, houses a nostalgia store and suite rentals
F. W. Woolworth Building (Broadway, Los Angeles)		Broadway, Los Angeles, California; 34.0450°N 118.2543°W	1920	Contributing property in the NRHP-listed Broadway Theater and Commercial District
F. W. Woolworth Building (Hollywood, Los Angeles)		Hollywood, Los Angeles, California; 34.101°N 118.330°W	1910	Restored in 2001
F. W. Woolworth Building (Oxnard, California)		Oxnard, California; 34°11′56″N 119°10′45″W	1950	Later a museum, now Xielo Artisan Desserts (Woolworth name still on building)
F. W. Woolworth Building (San Diego)		San Diego, California; 32°42′55″N 117°09′36″W	1922	Part of the Gaslamp Quarter Historic District
Flood Building		San Francisco, California; 37°47′06″N 122°24′27″W	1904	Largest store in the chain
F. W. Woolworth Building (Wilmington, Delaware)		Wilmington, Delaware; 39°45′03″N 75°33′06″W	1940	Now a Walgreens
2nd F. W. Woolworth Building (Wilmington, Delaware)		Wilmington, Delaware; 39°44′34″N 75°33′01″W	1941	Now the Delaware History Museum
F. W. Woolworth Building (Evansville, Indiana)		Evansville, Indiana; 37°58′41″N 87°34′09″W	1921	Burned down in 1990, NRHP-delisted in 1993
F. W. Woolworth Building (New Albany, Indiana)		New Albany, Indiana	1910	A contributing building to the New Albany Downtown Historic District
F. W. Woolworth Building (Lexington, Kentucky)		Lexington, Kentucky; 38°02′47″N 84°29′51″W	1946	Site of sit-in during the Civil Rights Movement
F. W. Woolworth Building (Calumet, Michigan)		Calumet, Michigan	1948	A contributing building in the Calumet Historic District within the Keweenaw National Historical Park. Now the Keweenaw Storytelling Center
F. W. Woolworth Building (Clarksdale, Mississippi)		Clarksdale, Mississippi; 34°20′34″N 90°57′37″W	1924	NRHP listed in 2009
F. W. Woolworth Building (Kansas City, Missouri)		Kansas City, Missouri; 39°04′16″N 94°34′18″W	1928	Now an art gallery
F. W. Woolworth Building (St. Louis, Missouri)		St. Louis, Missouri; 38°38′22″N 90°14′05″W	1899	Now the Saint Louis University Museum of Art
F. W. Woolworth Building (Lebanon, New Hampshire)		Lebanon, New Hampshire; 43°38′33″N 72°15′11″W		Now Lebanon College located next door to Dartmouth-Hitchcock Women's Health Resource Center
Shadow Lawn (New Jersey)		West Long Branch, New Jersey; 40°14′46″N 74°00′19″W	1927	Estate of Woolworth president, now Woodrow Wilson Hall at Monmouth University
Winfield Hall		Glen Cove, New York; 40°52′31″N 73°38′38″W	1916	Estate of F. W. Woolworth
Woolworth Building		New York, New York; 40°42′44″N 74°00′29″W	1913	Headquarters and World's tallest building, 1913–1930
F. W. Woolworth Building (Watertown, New York)		Watertown, New York; 43°58′29″N 75°54′34″W	1921	Currently vacant, redevelopment in planning stages
F. W. Woolworth Building (Asheville, North Carolina)		Asheville, North Carolina; 35°35′43″N 82°33′16″W	1938	Now a local-artist art gallery/old-fashioned soda fountain called Woolworth Walk
F. W. Woolworth Building (Greensboro, North Carolina)		Greensboro, North Carolina; 36.0717°N 79.7904°W	1929	Site of Greensboro sit-ins
F. W. Woolworth Building (Columbus, Ohio)		Columbus, Ohio; 39.9597°N 83.0006°W	1938	Currently vacant; held a CVS from 2003 to 2022
F. W. Woolworth Building (Fort Worth, Texas)		Fort Worth, Texas; 32°45′14″N 97°19′54″W	1926	NRHP listed in 1994
F. W. Woolworth Building (San Antonio)		San Antonio, Texas	1921	Famous for having peacefully desegregated its lunch counter alongside six others local stores of San Antonio on march 16 1960. Will become part of the Alamo Mission historic site.
F. W. Woolworth Building (Renton, Washington)		Renton, Washington; 47°28′47.49″N 122°12′25.21″W	1954	Now a Western Wear store
F. W. Woolworth Building (Toronto)		Toronto; 43°39′09″N 79°22′47″W	1895	Later a Tower Records
Winfield House		London; 51°31′51″N 0°09′52″W	1930s	Ambassador's residence
