= Raphael Johann Steidele =

Austrian surgeon and obstetrician

Raphael Johann Steidele (20 February 1737, Innsbruck – 10 September 1823, Vienna) was an Austrian surgeon and obstetrician.

He studied at the University of Vienna, receiving his magister degree for obstetrics in 1764 and his doctorate for surgery in 1784. Beginning in 1789 he was associated with the university obstetrics clinic, and from 1797 to 1817, was a professor of theoretical gynecology at the University of Vienna.

His name is associated with the "Steidele complex", being defined as absence of the aortic arch. He first described the anomaly in 1788.

== Selected works ==
- Abhandlung von dem unvermeidentlichen Gebrauch der Instrumente in der Geburtshilfe, 1774 – Treatise on the unavoidable use of instruments in obstetrics.
- Lehrbuch von der Hebammenkunst : mit Kupfern versehen, 1775 – Textbook of midwifery: provided with engravings.
- Abhandlung von Blutflüssen, 1776 – Treatise on blood flow.
- Sammlung verschiedener in der chirurgisch-praktischen Lehrschule gemachten Beobachtungen, 1776 – Various observations made in the practical surgery training school.
- Lehrbuch von dem unvermeidentlichen Gebrauch der Instrumente in der Geburtshülfe, 1785 – Textbook on the unavoidable use of instruments in midwifery.
