= Trinity Episcopal Church and Parish House =

Historic church in New York, United States

- U.S. National Register of Historic Places
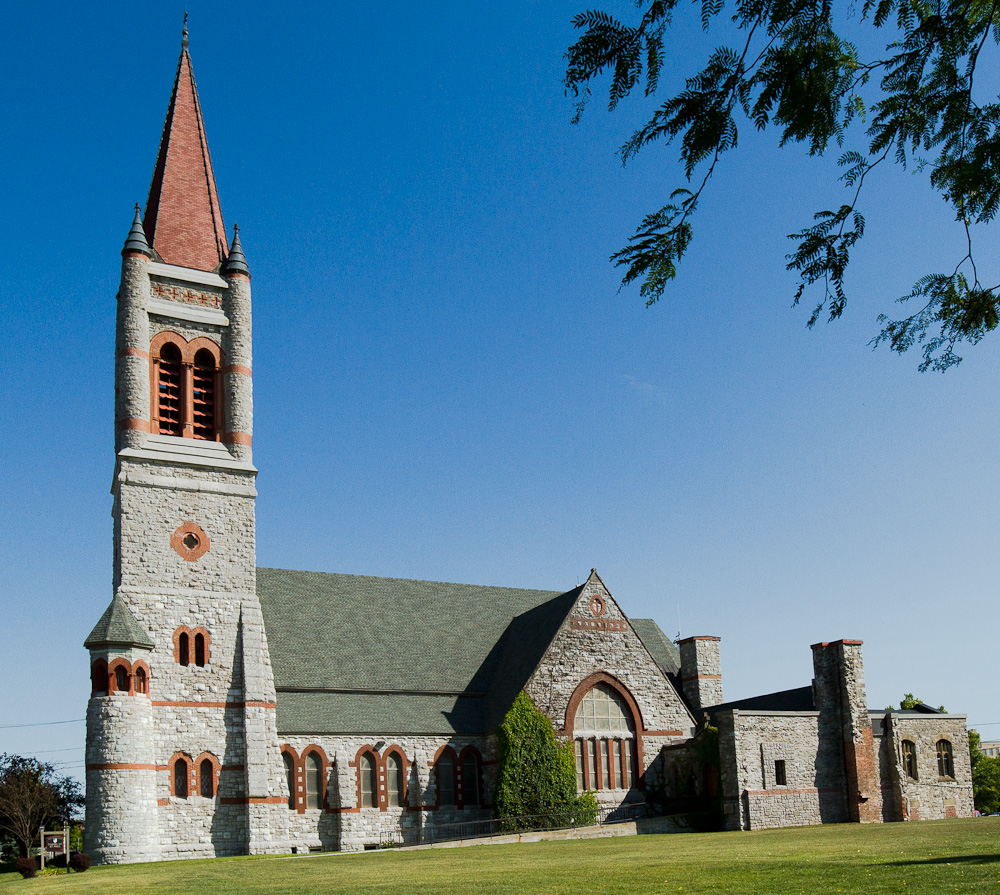
- Trinity Episcopal Church, September 2018

- Location within New York Location within the United States
- Location: 227 Sherman St., Watertown, New York
- Coordinates: 43°58′24″N 75°54′55″W
- Area: 1.1 acres (0.45 ha)
- Built: 1889
- Architect: Wentworth, W.P.; et al.
- Architectural style: Romanesque, Gothic
- MPS: Historic Churches of the Episcopal Diocese of Central New York MPS
- NRHP reference No.: 00000747
- Added to NRHP: June 30, 2000

Trinity Episcopal Church and Parish House is a historic Episcopal church located at Watertown in Jefferson County, New York. The church was built in 1889-1890 and is massive, rambling Richardsonian Romanesque–style edifice built of random coursed, ashlar stone with a water table and foundation of similar stone. The parish house was built in 1912–1913.

It was listed on the National Register of Historic Places in 2000.
