= Soldiers and Sailors Monument (Watertown, New York) =

Monument in Watertown, New York

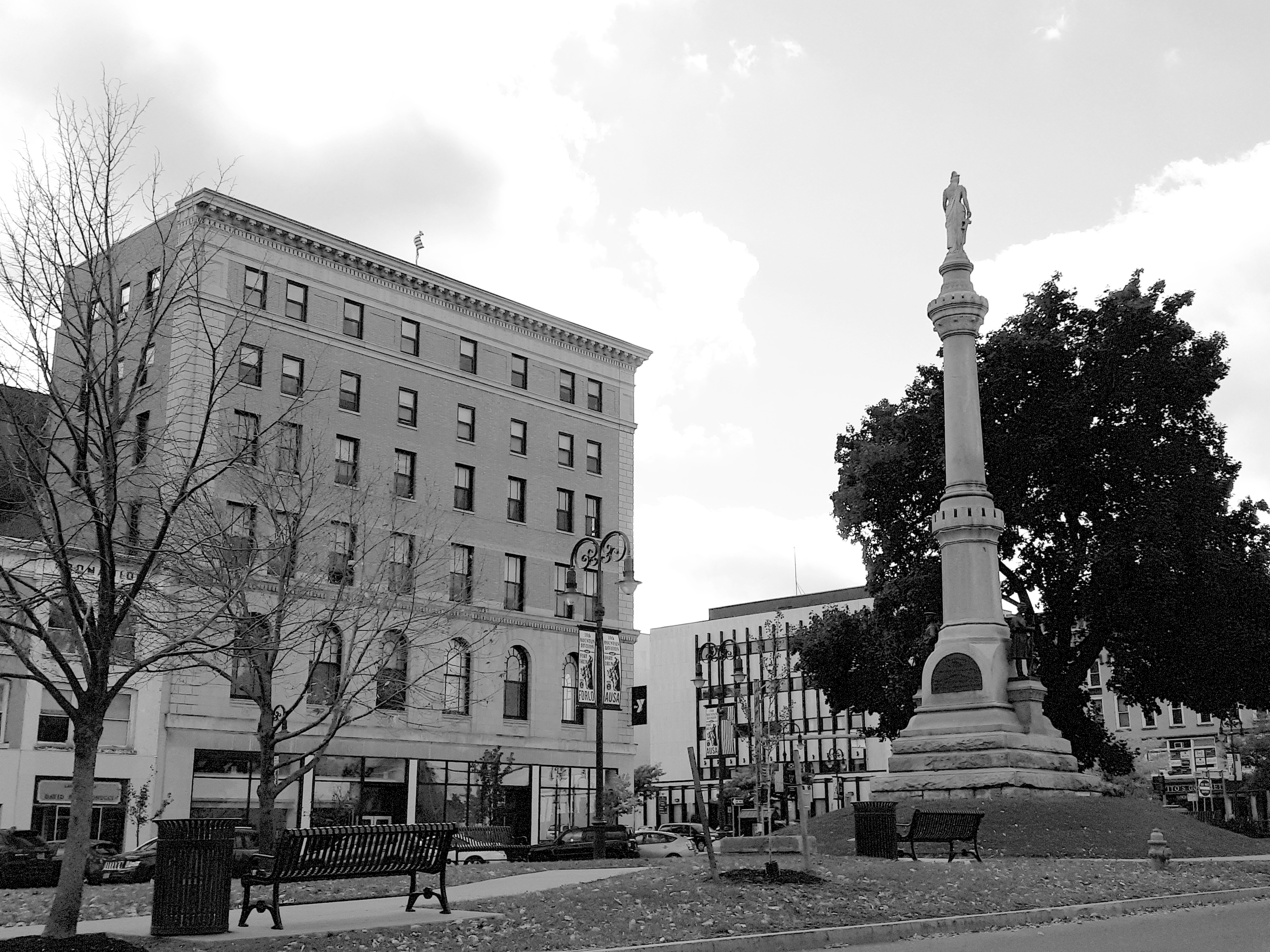
- The monument in October 2018.
- Location: Public square in Watertown.
- Coordinates: 43°58′29″N 75°54′37″W
- Material: granite with bronze statues
- Height: 50 feet
- Dedicated date: June 3, 1891
- Restored date: 2009-2012
- Dedicated to: Civil War sailors and soldiers

The Soldiers and Sailors Monument in Watertown, New York was erected in 1891 to commemorate local citizens who fought in the Civil War. The monument rests upon the former village green, which has been located there since 1805.

== History and description ==
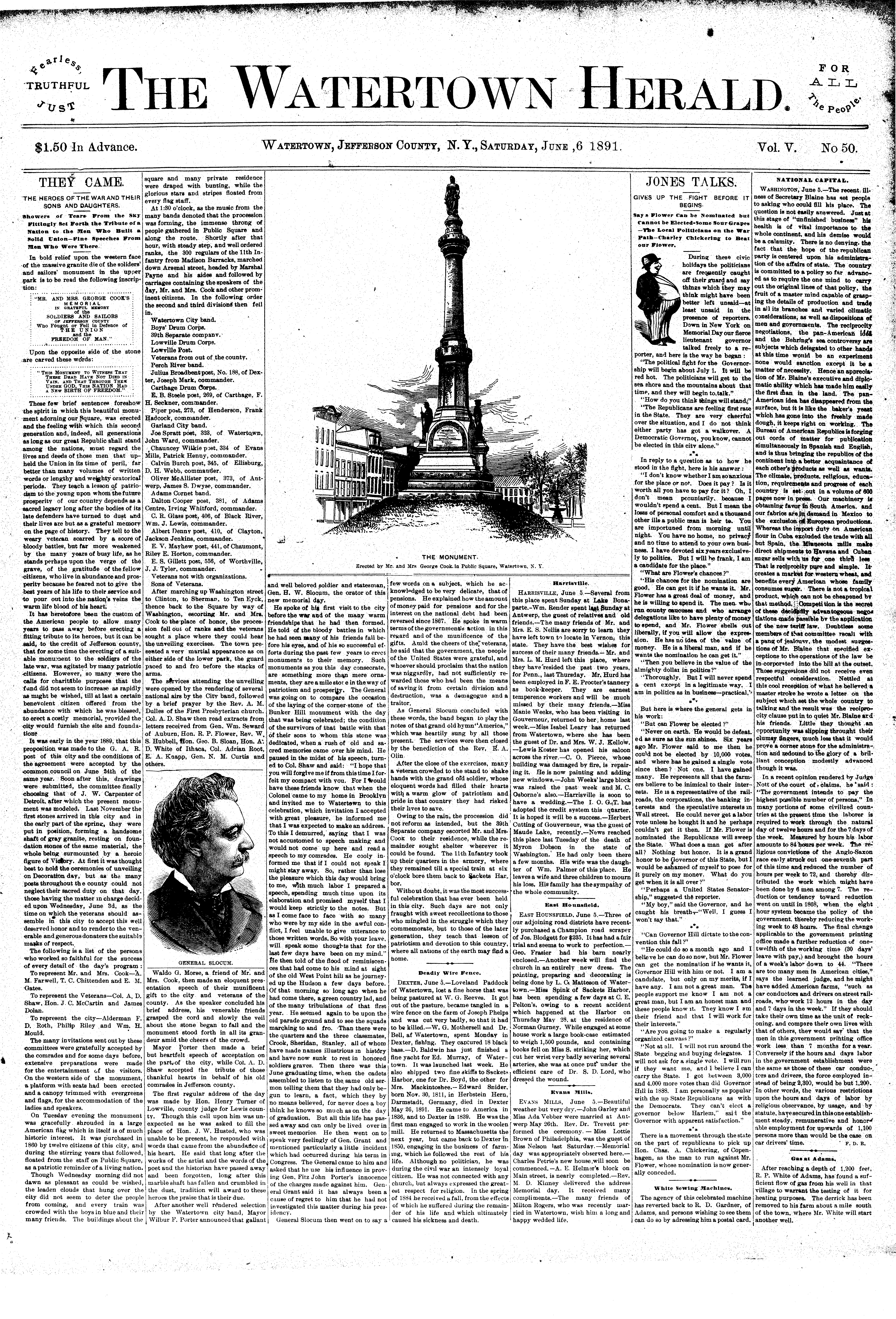
Watertown Herald newspaper report on the monument's completion, 6 June 1891.

The granite monument is approximately 50 feet tall, resting upon a raised earthen berm. It sits on a 12-foot base. An allegorical figure of Victory (seven and a half feet tall) sits atop a decorative column, plinth and base. Commemorative bronze plaques are on the east and west sides of the monument, with a cast bronze soldier on the north side and a cast bronze sailor on the south side. The sailor and soldier are in period uniforms, standing at parade rest. The cornerstone was laid in the afternoon on Memorial Day late May 1890; the ceremony featured a speech by Colonel Albert D. Shaw given to "brother soldiers", local notables and the public who attended. The Watertown Herald prominently featured an engraving of the monument on their front page on June 6, 1891.

The monument was dedicated on June 3, 1891 in the Public Square in Watertown. $10,000 was donated toward the monument by a Mr. and Mrs. George Cook. The night before it was unveiled, the monument was covered by a large US flag, measuring 36 feet long. It once flew from a flagpole in the square when each of the local regiments left for the Civil War. Originally costing $115, it was said to be the largest flag in the state at the time.

Plaques on the monument read: "In grateful memory of the Soldiers and Sailors of Jefferson County who fought or fell in defense of the Union and the freedom of man.

This monument to witness that these dead have not died in vain and that through them, under God, this nation had a new birth of freedom."

The monument underwent restorations and conservation between 2009 and 2012. It was cleaned, stabilized and repaired, which included adding the sailor's missing cutlass blade. The monument was found not to be leaning in any particular direction at that time. The monument forms part of the Public Square Historic District in Watertown, listed in the National Register of Historic Places
