= Paddock Arcade =

United States historic place

- U.S. National Register of Historic Places
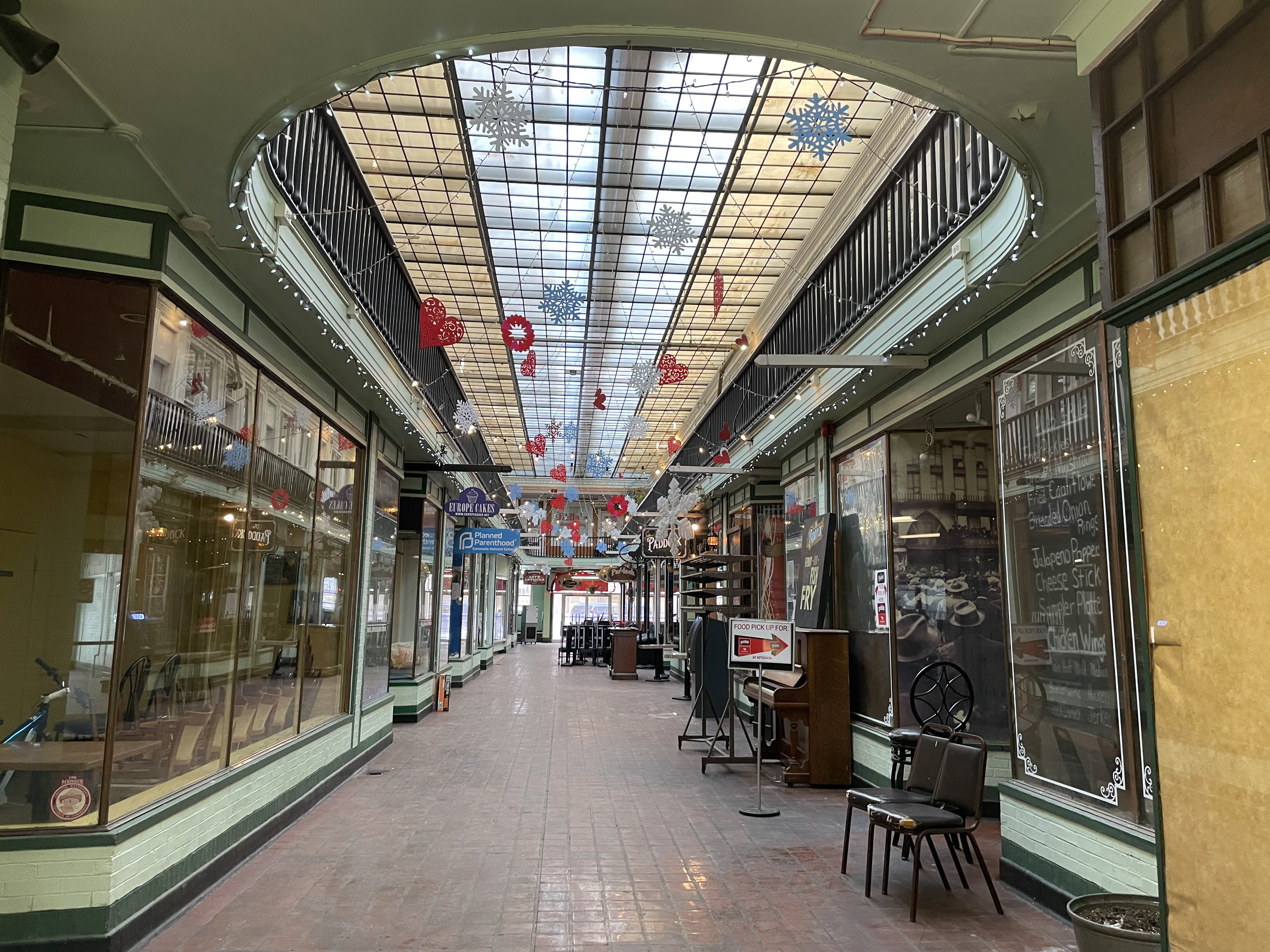
- Paddock Arcade

- Location within New York Location within the United States
- Location: Washington St. between Arsenal and Stone Sts., Watertown, New York
- Coordinates: 43°58′25″N 75°54′40.5″W
- Area: less than one acre
- Built: 1850
- Architect: Otis Wheelock
- Architectural style: Gothic Revival
- NRHP reference No.: 76001224
- Added to NRHP: June 15, 1976

The Paddock Arcade is a 19th-century shopping mall located in Watertown, New York. Built in 1850, it is the second oldest covered shopping mall in the United States. Since it has seen uninterrupted use after opening in 1850, it carries the distinction of being the country's oldest, continuously operating enclosed shopping mall. The Paddock Arcade was listed on the National Register of Historic Places in 1976.

== Location and architecture ==
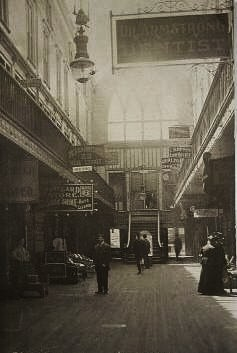
The Paddock Arcade 1909, its original Gothic Revival interior featured a large, pointed arched window seen in this photo.

At No. 1 Public Square, the arcade remains the benchmark structure in Watertown's historic downtown district. The structure runs perpendicular to the adjoining Paddock Building. The arcade was built in the Gothic style, topped with a glass roof that allowed daylight to filter through. The Paddock Building contains a 19th-century Italianate facade.

== History ==
The arcade was built by Watertown native Loveland Paddock and designed by architect Otis Wheelock. It was based on similar arcades built during that era in the United States and Europe. Shops occupied the bottom floor, while the upper floors were used for office space.

In about 1916, a large section of the Paddock Building was demolished to make way for the six-story Woolworth Building. In the 1920s, arcade owners put forth a major redesign of the arcade, eschewing its original Gothic interior with a more modern design, which included the installation of the current translucent, steel-and-wire-glass dropped ceiling between its second and third stories. This ceiling still allowed light to filter in from the arcade's glass roof.

== Today ==
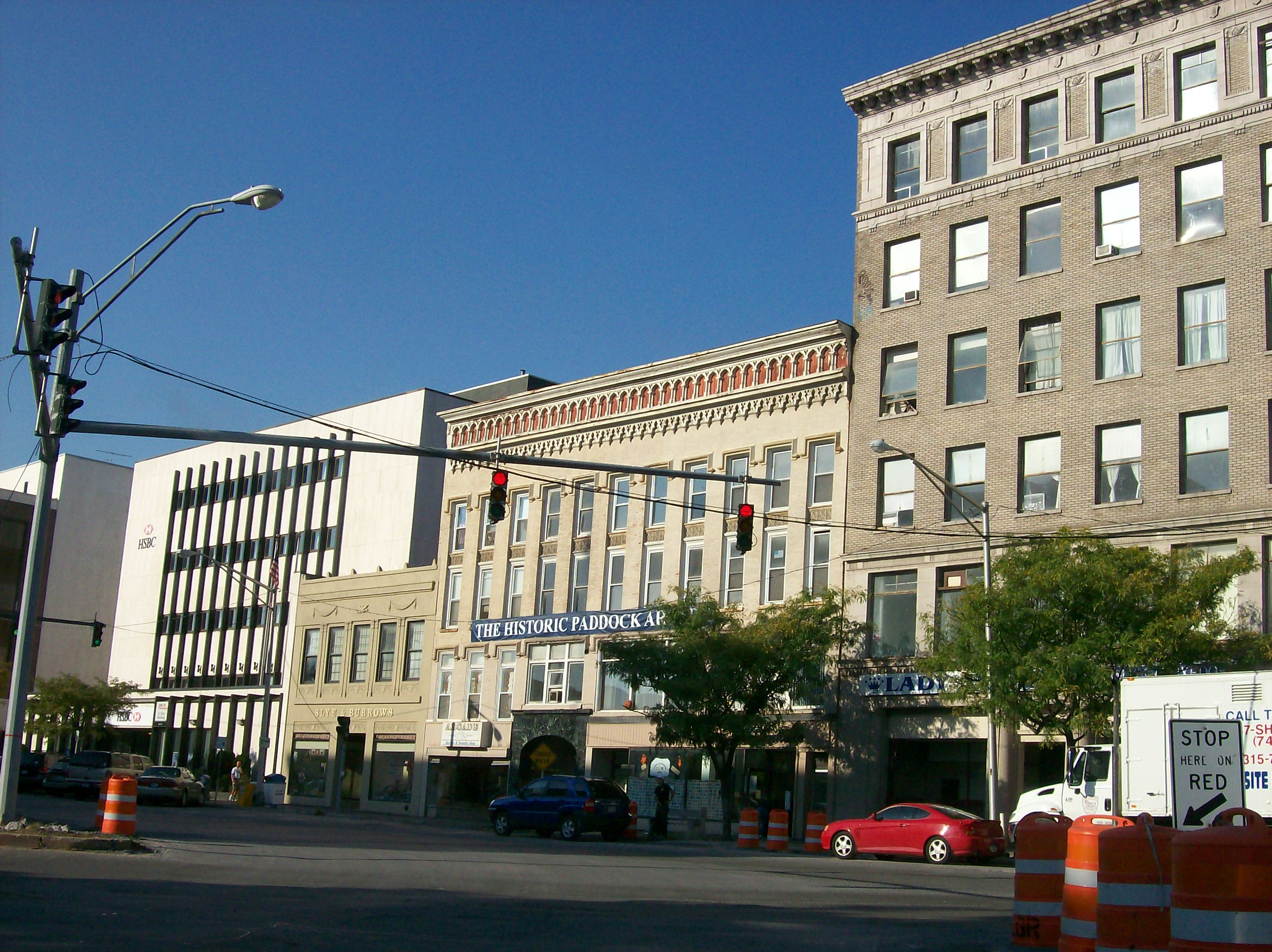
The Paddock Building (second from right)

The arcade still functions as a shopping and business center in Watertown's downtown district. In recent years, structural and aesthetic improvements, coupled with new businesses are helping to guarantee the arcade's future. The arcade is the current (2024) home to Planned Parenthood, Johnny D's Casual Dining, Paddock Club Tavern, O-HO Boba Tea, CaffeineHolic, Paddock Arts & Antiques, Laborer's Local 1822, Kellogg & Kellogg LLP, Yoga House, American Kang Duk Wan Karate Assoc., Inked Arches, The Speakeasy Hair Salon, Anbu Tattoo, Vito's Gourmet. In 2007, it was announced that the arcade would be host to Watertown's popular farmers' market for its extended fall season.

== See also ==
- Public Square (Watertown, New York)
- Italianate architecture
- Gothic Revival architecture
- Galleria Vittorio Emanuele II
- Cleveland arcade
- Westminster Arcade, the oldest enclosed shopping mall in the United States
