= Little Trees =

Tree-shaped air fresheners

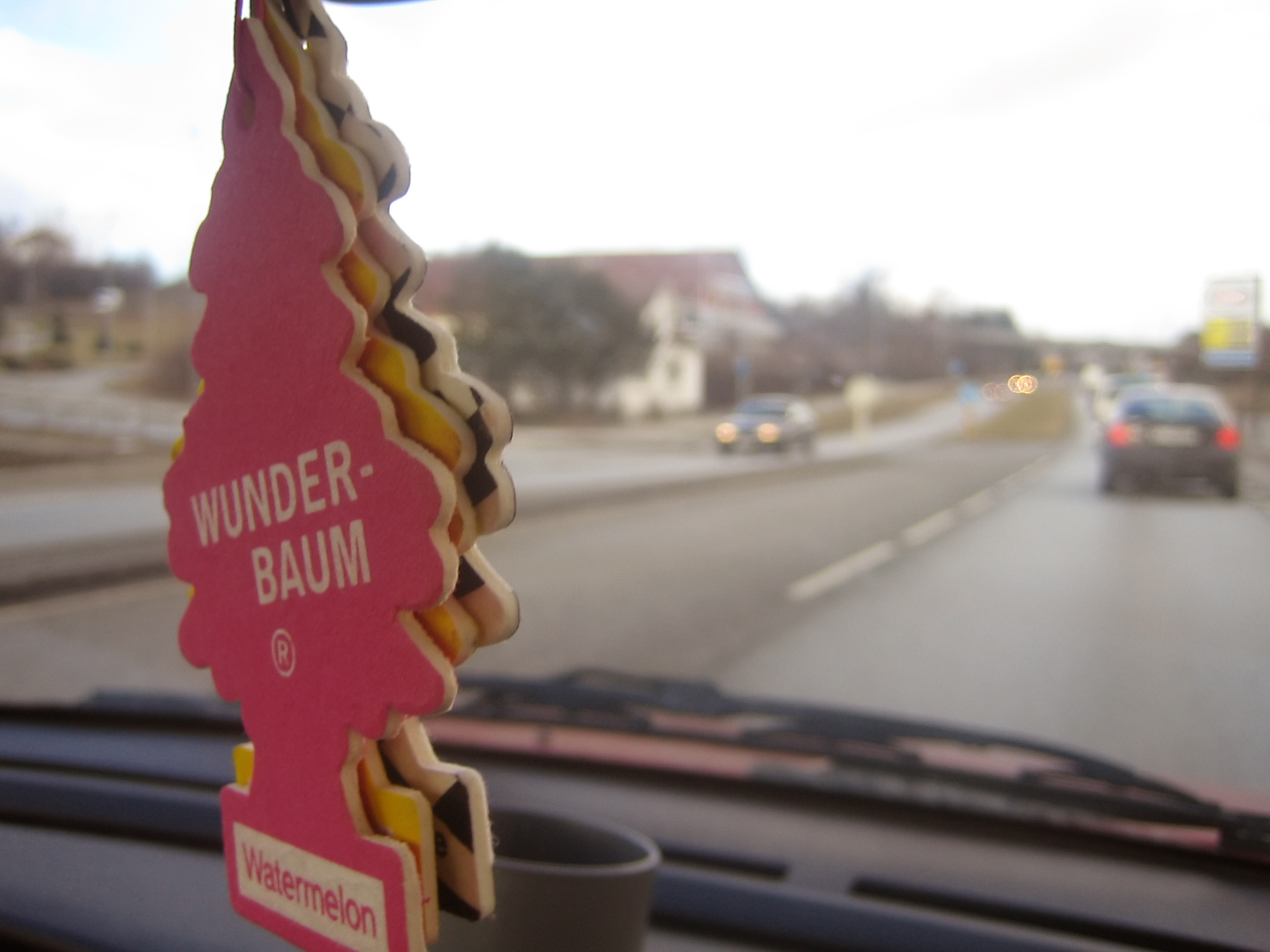
Little Trees hanging from a car's rear view mirror

Little Trees are disposable air fresheners shaped like a stylized evergreen tree, marketed for use in motor vehicles, and most commonly seen hanging from rear-view mirrors. They are made of an absorbent material produced in a variety of colors and scents.

Little Trees were invented in 1952 in Watertown, New York, by Julius Sämann, a German-Jewish chemist and businessman who had fled the Nazis. He had studied Alpine tree aromas in the forests of Canada and was interested in the biological mechanisms used to transport and disseminate them. Little Trees air fresheners are manufactured in the United States by the Car-Freshner Corporation at factories (such as Royal Pine) in Watertown, New York and DeWitt, Iowa. Several companies in Europe produce Little Trees under license from Julius Sämann Ltd. using the names Wunder-Baum (in Austria, Switzerland, Denmark, Finland, Germany, Norway, Poland, Romania, Slovenia, Hungary and Sweden) and Arbre Magique (in France, Belgium, the Netherlands, Italy, Portugal, and Spain). It was formerly known as Magic Tree in the United Kingdom until the "Little Tree" name was adopted in 2011. The company is known for pursuing lawsuits to protect its trademark.

== Trademark ==
Car-Freshner fiercely defends its trademark of the tree-shaped air freshener design, and has filed several lawsuits against makers of lookalike products and against companies that use their products in other commercial media.

- In 2002, Car-Freshner sued Rite Way Wholesale and Distributors, Inc. of New York for importing and distributing a "vanilla-scented tree shaped air fresheners with a patriotic design". As a result of the judgement, the defendants were required to surrender their entire inventory to the plaintiffs for destruction, and were required to pay an unspecified penalty.
- In 2006, Car-Freshner sued Dale Detwiler (owner of the Austin, Texas-based Corndog Cards & Novelties) after Detwiler company produced holiday greeting cards that bore a glow-in-the-dark image of a scratch-and-sniff tree-shaped air freshener.
- In 2006, Car-Freshner won a suit against UK-based Tetrosyl Ltd for producing a tree-shaped air freshener that "included snow, flashing lights, the shape of a tub at the bottom".
- In 2009, Car-Freshner sued Getty Images for unauthorized use of its tree-shaped air fresheners in a series of stock photographs.
- Julius Sämann Ltd. filed a complaint with the Norwegian Industrial Property Office (NIPO) against Bulgarian air-freshener manufacturer Balev Eood for producing an aircraft-shaped air freshener which was somewhat similar in shape to their trademarked fir tree shape. NIPO rejected the complaint, and the Board of Appeal upheld the decision in January 2011.
- In 2011, Car-Freshner sued Beck & Call for producing a similar line of tree-shaped promotional air fresheners.
- In December 2015, Car-Freshner sued Sun Cedar, a non-profit organization that aimed to provide gainful employment to the homeless and previously incarcerated, for producing tree-shaped air fresheners made of cedar wood. In September 2016, unable to cope with the growing legal costs, Sun Cedar filed for bankruptcy.
- In 2018, Car-Freshner sued Balenciaga for making $275 key chains that copy the appearance of the Little Trees air fresheners.

== In popular culture ==
British artist Jack Williams, the son of a car salesman, created ‘‘Forest’’, a 2009 installation using 350 Royal Pine air fresheners, hung in a square configuration from the ceiling via fishing wire.

In the I Am Weasel episode Power of Odor, the atmosphere of a city is being compromised by the stench of pigs owned by I.R. Baboon. The city's mayor tries to take on the smell as he walks into the scene with a tree-shaped air freshener tied to his nose. But the stench proves too powerful when his air freshener turns into soot.

In the sloth scene in the 1995 film Seven, several 'Little Tree' air-fresheners were suspended in a room to mask the smell of the emaciated body.

In the Chowder episode Stinky Love, Mung Daal's staff manages to make dozens of a stinky dish in deep pans. Because Schnitzel could not take the dish’s strong smell, he has to wear a few Little Trees as he serves them to the customers.

In the 2009 adult animated short film Logorama the green and pink Little Trees air-fresheners were seen in the background.

== Legality ==
In the United States, many states have regulations concerning obstructed view, objects hanging from the rear-view mirror, obstructed windshield, or similar legislation. Citations and/or custodial arrests for violations of such statutes are not unknown.
