= Julius Sämann =

German-Canadian perfumist and chemist

Julius Sämann (German: [ˈjuːli̯ʊs ˈzɛːman], French: [ʒyljy(s) sɛman]; 15 April 1911 in Uffenheim, Germany – May 9, 1999) was a German-Canadian chemist who invented many everyday items, including Little Trees pine-tree-shaped air fresheners in Watertown, New York in 1952.

Sämann was born in Uffenheim, Bavaria, Germany to parents Simon Sämann and Lia Weglein.
