= Oppenheimer security clearance hearing =

1954 United States Atomic Energy Commission investigation

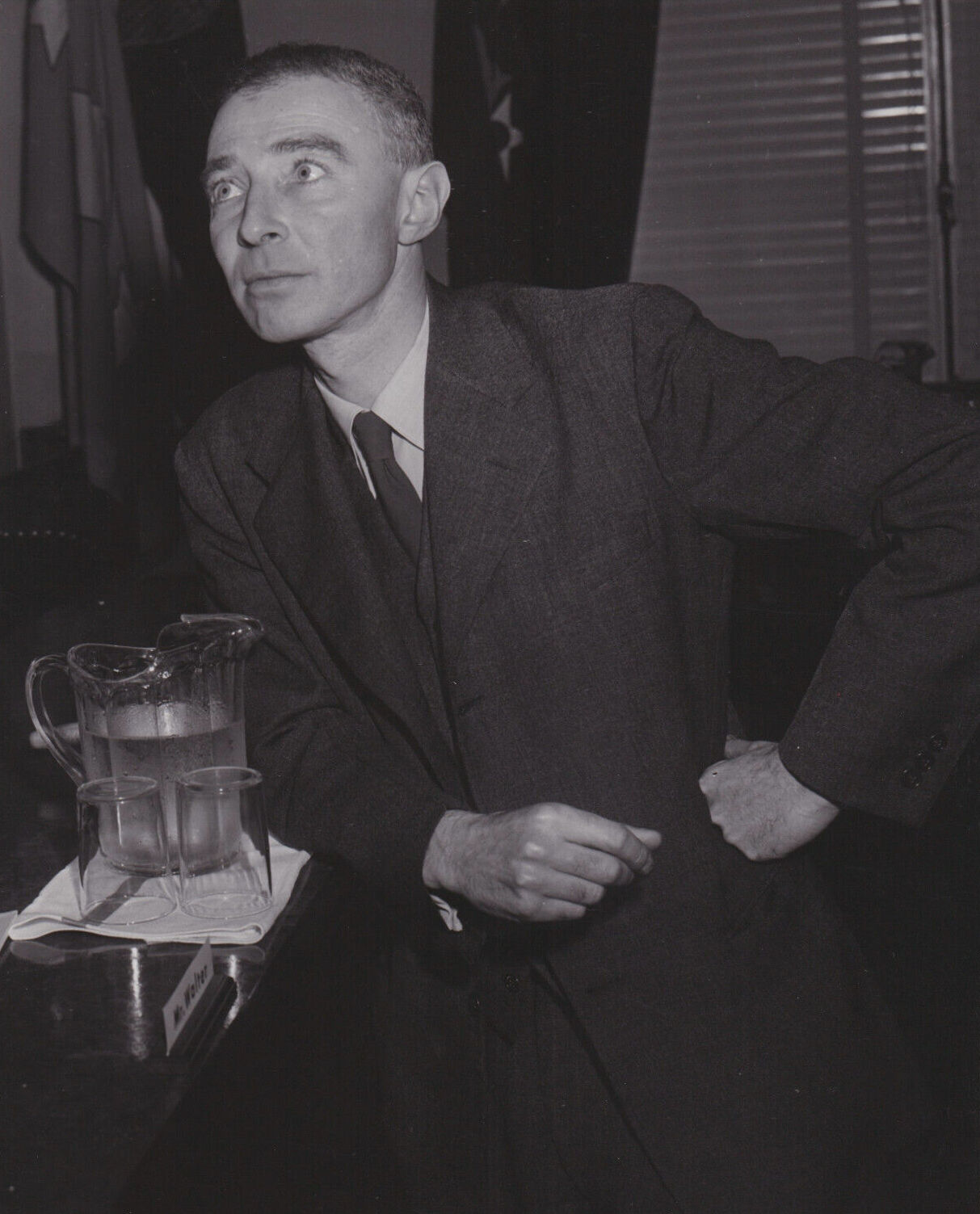
- J. Robert Oppenheimer (1953 photograph) was probed in a controversial four-week hearing in 1954.
- Date: April 12 – May 6, 1954
- Venue: Temporary building 3 near the Washington Monument housing offices of the AEC
- Location: Washington, D.C.
- Also known as: In the Matter of J. Robert Oppenheimer
- Type: Hearing
- Theme: Loyalty-security
- Organised by: Lewis Strauss; Kenneth D. Nichols
- Participants: AEC: Roger Robb (counsel); J. Robert Oppenheimer; Lloyd K. Garrison (counsel); Hearing panel: Gordon Gray (chair); Thomas Alfred Morgan; Ward V. Evans
- Outcome: Revocation of Oppenheimer's security clearance

Over four weeks in 1954, the United States Atomic Energy Commission (AEC) explored the background, actions, and associations of J. Robert Oppenheimer, the American scientist who directed the Los Alamos Laboratory during World War II as part of the Manhattan Project to develop the atomic bomb. The hearing resulted in Oppenheimer's Q clearance being revoked. This marked the end of his formal relationship with the Eisenhower government and generated considerable controversy regarding whether the treatment of Oppenheimer was fair, or whether it was an expression of anti-communist McCarthyism.

Doubts about Oppenheimer's loyalty dated back to the 1930s, when he was a member of numerous Communist front organizations and was associated with Communist Party USA members, including his wife, brother and sister-in-law. These associations were known to Army Counterintelligence at the time he was made director of the Los Alamos Laboratory in 1942 and chairman of the influential General Advisory Committee of the AEC in 1947. In this capacity, Oppenheimer became involved in bureaucratic conflict between the Army and Air Force over the types of nuclear weapons the country required, technical conflict between the scientists over the feasibility of the hydrogen bomb, and personal conflict with AEC commissioner Lewis Strauss.

The proceedings were initiated after Oppenheimer refused to voluntarily give up his security clearance while working as an atomic weapons consultant for the US government, under a contract due to expire at the end of June 1954. Several of his colleagues testified at the hearings. As a result of the two-to-one decision of the hearing's three judges, he was stripped of his security clearance one day before his consultant contract was due to expire. The panel found that he was loyal and discreet with atomic secrets, but did not recommend that his security clearance be reinstated.

The loss of his security clearance ended Oppenheimer's role in government and policy. He became an academic exile, cut off from his former career and the world he had helped to create. The reputations of those who had testified against Oppenheimer were tarnished as well, though Oppenheimer's reputation was later partly rehabilitated by presidents John F. Kennedy and Lyndon B. Johnson. The brief period when scientists were viewed as a "public-policy priesthood" ended; thereafter, they would serve the state only to offer narrow scientific opinions. Scientists working in government were on notice that dissent was no longer tolerated.

The fairness of the proceedings has been a subject of controversy, criticized in the Oppenheimer biography American Prometheus (2005) and dramatized in film and television. On December 16, 2022, United States secretary of energy Jennifer Granholm nullified the 1954 decision, saying that it had been the result of a "flawed process" and affirming that Oppenheimer had been loyal.

== Background ==
Before World War II, Robert Oppenheimer had been professor of physics at the University of California, Berkeley. The scion of a wealthy New York family, he was a graduate of Harvard University and had studied in Europe at the University of Cambridge in England, the University of Göttingen in Germany (where he had earned his doctorate in physics at the age of 23 under the supervision of Max Born), and the University of Leiden in the Netherlands. As one of the few American physicists with a deep understanding of the new field of quantum mechanics, he was hired by the University of California in 1929.

As a theoretical physicist, Oppenheimer had considerable achievements. In a 1930 paper on the Dirac equation, he predicted the existence of the positron. A 1938 paper co-written with Robert Serber explored the properties of white dwarf stars. This was followed by one co-written with one of his students, George Volkoff, in which they demonstrated that there was a limit, the so-called Tolman–Oppenheimer–Volkoff limit, to the mass of stars beyond which they would not remain stable as neutron stars and would undergo gravitational collapse. In 1939, with another of his students, Hartland Snyder, he went further and predicted the existence of what are today known as black holes. It was decades before the significance of this was appreciated.

Still, Oppenheimer was not well known before World War II, and certainly not as renowned as his friend and colleague Ernest O. Lawrence, who was awarded the Nobel Prize in Physics in 1939 for his invention of the cyclotron. As an experimental physicist, Lawrence had come to rely on Oppenheimer, and it was Lawrence who brought Oppenheimer into the effort to develop an atomic bomb, which became known as the Manhattan Project. Brigadier General Leslie R. Groves, Jr., who became director of the Manhattan Project on September 8, 1942, met Oppenheimer at Berkeley, where Oppenheimer briefed Groves on the work done so far on the "Super" (thermonuclear) bomb. Oppenheimer told Groves on October 8 that the Manhattan Project needed a dedicated weapons development laboratory. Groves agreed, and after a second meeting with Oppenheimer on a train on October 15, decided that Oppenheimer was the man he needed to head what became the Los Alamos Laboratory, despite Oppenheimer's lack of a Nobel Prize or administrative experience.

The end of the Pacific War in the wake of the atomic bombing of Hiroshima and Nagasaki made scientists into heroes. Oppenheimer became a celebrity, with his face appearing on front pages of newspapers and the covers of magazines. Life magazine described him as "one of the most famous men in the world, one of the most admired, quoted, photographed, consulted, glorified, well-nigh deified as the fabulous and fascinating archetype of a brand new kind of hero, the hero of science and intellect, originator and living symbol of the new atomic age."

=== Chevalier incident ===
Several of Oppenheimer's associates in the years before World War II were Communist Party USA members. They included his wife Kitty, whose second husband Joe Dallet had been killed fighting with the Lincoln Battalion in the Spanish Civil War; his brother Frank Oppenheimer and Frank's wife Jackie; and his girlfriend Jean Tatlock. One of his communist associates was Haakon Chevalier, an assistant professor of French literature at the University of California. The two had met during a rally for Spanish Loyalists, and had co-founded the Local 349 branch of the American Federation of Teachers at Berkeley.

The FBI opened a file on Oppenheimer in March 1941, after he had attended a December 1940 meeting at Chevalier's home that was also attended by the Communist Party's California state secretary William Schneiderman and its treasurer Isaac Folkoff, both of whom were targets of FBI surveillance and wiretaps. Agents had recorded the license plate of Oppenheimer's car. The FBI noted that Oppenheimer was on the executive committee of the American Civil Liberties Union, which it considered a communist front. Shortly thereafter, the FBI added Oppenheimer to its Custodial Detention Index, for arrest in case of national emergency.

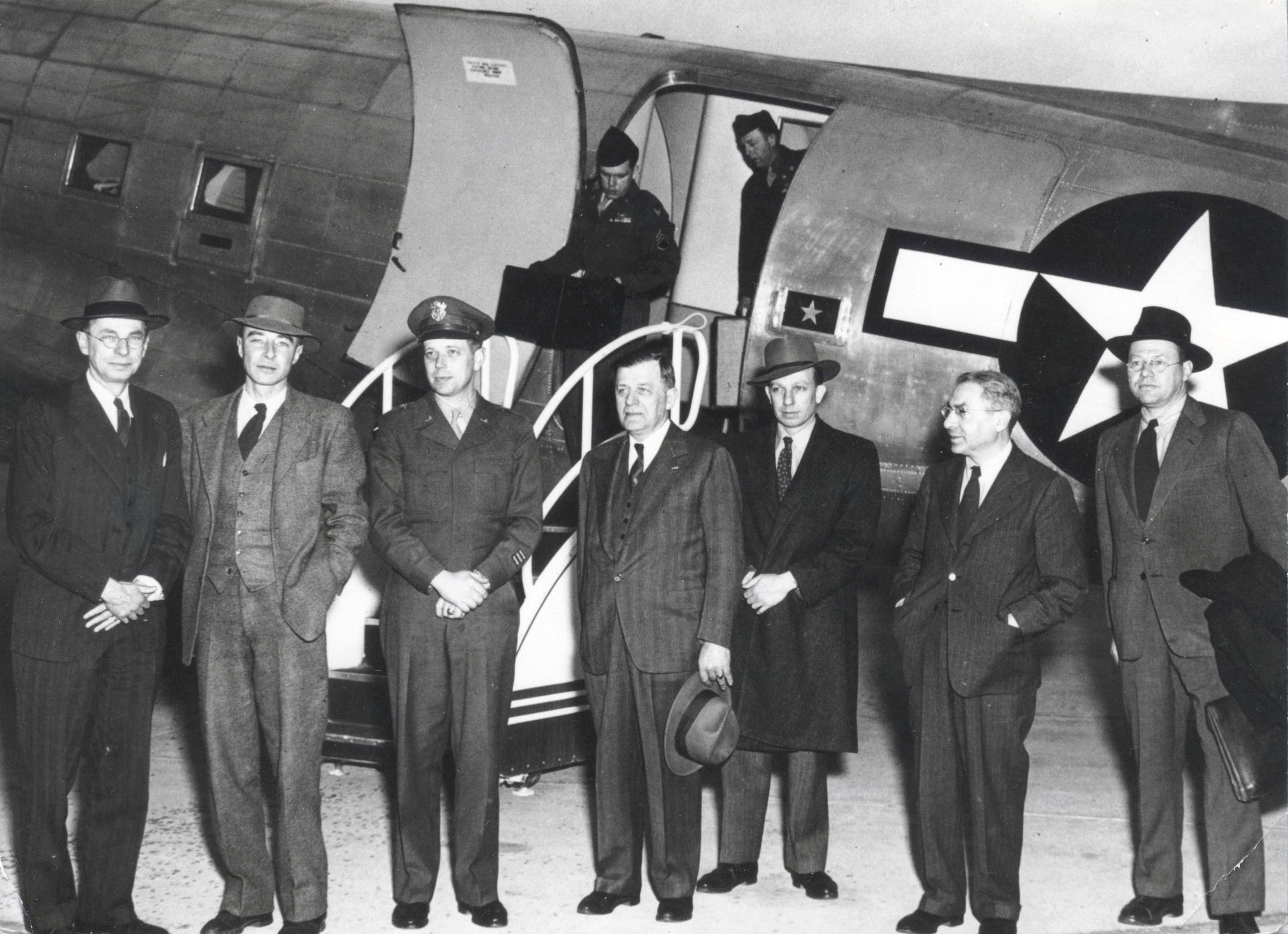
The General Advisory Committee (GAC) of the Atomic Energy Commission (AEC) in 1947; left to right: James B. Conant, J. Robert Oppenheimer, Brigadier General James McCormack, Hartley Rowe, John H. Manley, Isidor Isaac Rabi and Roger S. Warner

In January or February 1943, Chevalier had a brief conversation with Oppenheimer in the kitchen of his home. Chevalier told Oppenheimer that there was a scientist, George Eltenton, who could transmit information of a technical nature to the Soviet Union. Oppenheimer rejected the overture, but failed to report it until August 1943, when he volunteered to Manhattan Project security officers that three men at Berkeley had been solicited for nuclear secrets on behalf of the Soviet Union, by a person he did not know who worked for Shell Oil, and who had communist connections. He gave that person's name as Eltenton. When pressed on the issue in later interviews at Los Alamos in December 1943 with Groves, who promised to keep the identity of the three men from the FBI, Oppenheimer identified the contact who had approached him as Chevalier, and told Groves that only one person had been approached: his brother Frank. In any case, Groves considered Oppenheimer too important to the ultimate Allied goals of building atomic bombs and winning the war to oust him over any suspicious behavior. He had ordered on July 20, 1943, that Oppenheimer be given a security clearance "without delay, irrespective of the information which you have concerning Mr. Oppenheimer. He is absolutely essential to the project."

Oppenheimer was interviewed by FBI agents on September 5, 1946. He related the "Chevalier incident", and gave contradictory and equivocating statements, telling the agents that only he had been approached by Chevalier, who at the time had supposedly said that he had a potential conduit through Eltenton for information which could be passed to the Soviet Union. Oppenheimer claimed to have invented the other contacts to conceal the identity of Chevalier, whose identity he believed would be immediately apparent if he named only one contact, but whom he believed to be innocent of any disloyalty. The 1943 fabrication and the shifting nature of his accounts figured prominently in the 1954 inquiry.

The McMahon Act that established the Atomic Energy Commission (AEC) required all employees holding wartime security clearances issued by the Manhattan Project to be investigated by the FBI and re-certified. This provision had come in the wake of the February 16, 1946 announcement in Canada of the arrest of 22 people exposed as a consequence of the defection the previous September of Soviet cipher clerk Igor Gouzenko. President Harry S. Truman appointed Oppenheimer to the AEC General Advisory Committee (GAC) on December 10, 1946, so the FBI interviewed two dozen of Oppenheimer's associates, including Robert Bacher, Ernest Lawrence, Enrico Fermi and Robert Gordon Sproul. Groves and Secretary of War Robert P. Patterson supplied written statements supporting Oppenheimer. AEC chairman David Lilienthal and Vannevar Bush discussed the matter with Truman's sympathetic aide Clark Clifford at the White House. They found John Lansdale Jr. particularly persuasive; he had interrogated Oppenheimer over the Chevalier incident in 1943, and strongly supported him. On August 11, 1947, the AEC unanimously voted to grant Oppenheimer a Q clearance. At the first meeting of the GAC on January 3, 1947, Oppenheimer was unanimously elected its chairman.

=== Postwar conflicts ===
The FBI was willing to furnish Oppenheimer's political enemies with incriminating evidence about Communist ties. These included Lewis Strauss, an AEC commissioner who resented Oppenheimer for his humiliation before Congress regarding opposition to the export of radioactive isotopes to other nations, which Strauss believed had military applications. As GAC chairman, Oppenheimer had been called before the Joint Committee on Atomic Energy (JCAE) over the issue in June 1949. The other four AEC commissioners had opposed Strauss, so he had gone to the JCAE in an attempt to get the decision overturned. The result was a stunning humiliation for the thin-skinned Strauss.

Oppenheimer testified that:

No one can force me to say that you cannot use these isotopes for atomic energy. You can use a shovel for atomic energy, in fact you do. You can use a bottle of beer for atomic energy, in fact you do. But to get some perspective, the fact is that during the war and after the war these materials played no significant part, and in my knowledge, no part at all ... My own rating of the importance of isotopes in this broad sense is that they are far less important than electronic devices but far more important than, let us say, vitamins, somewhere in between.

This came on the heels of controversies about whether some of Oppenheimer's students, including David Bohm, Ross Lomanitz and Bernard Peters, had been Communists at the time they had worked with him at Berkeley. Oppenheimer was called to testify in front of the House Un-American Activities Committee (HUAC), where he admitted that he had associations with the Communist Party in the 1930s, and named some of his students as being Communists or closely associated with them. Bohm and Peters eventually left the country, while Lomanitz was forced to work as a laborer. Frank Oppenheimer was fired from his university position, and could not find work in physics for a decade. He and his wife Jackie became cattle ranchers in Colorado. Their reputations were rehabilitated in 1959, and they founded the San Francisco Exploratorium in 1969.

In 2005, David Kaiser noted that:

These dozen or so theoretical physicists surely came under fire for many reasons; with hindsight their troubles appear almost overdetermined. Most were Jewish; several had been active in labor organizing before or during the war; a few had flirted with the Communist Party in their youth; many were active in other leftwing political organizations after the war. Perhaps most important, however, they had close and long-standing ties with Robert Oppenheimer...

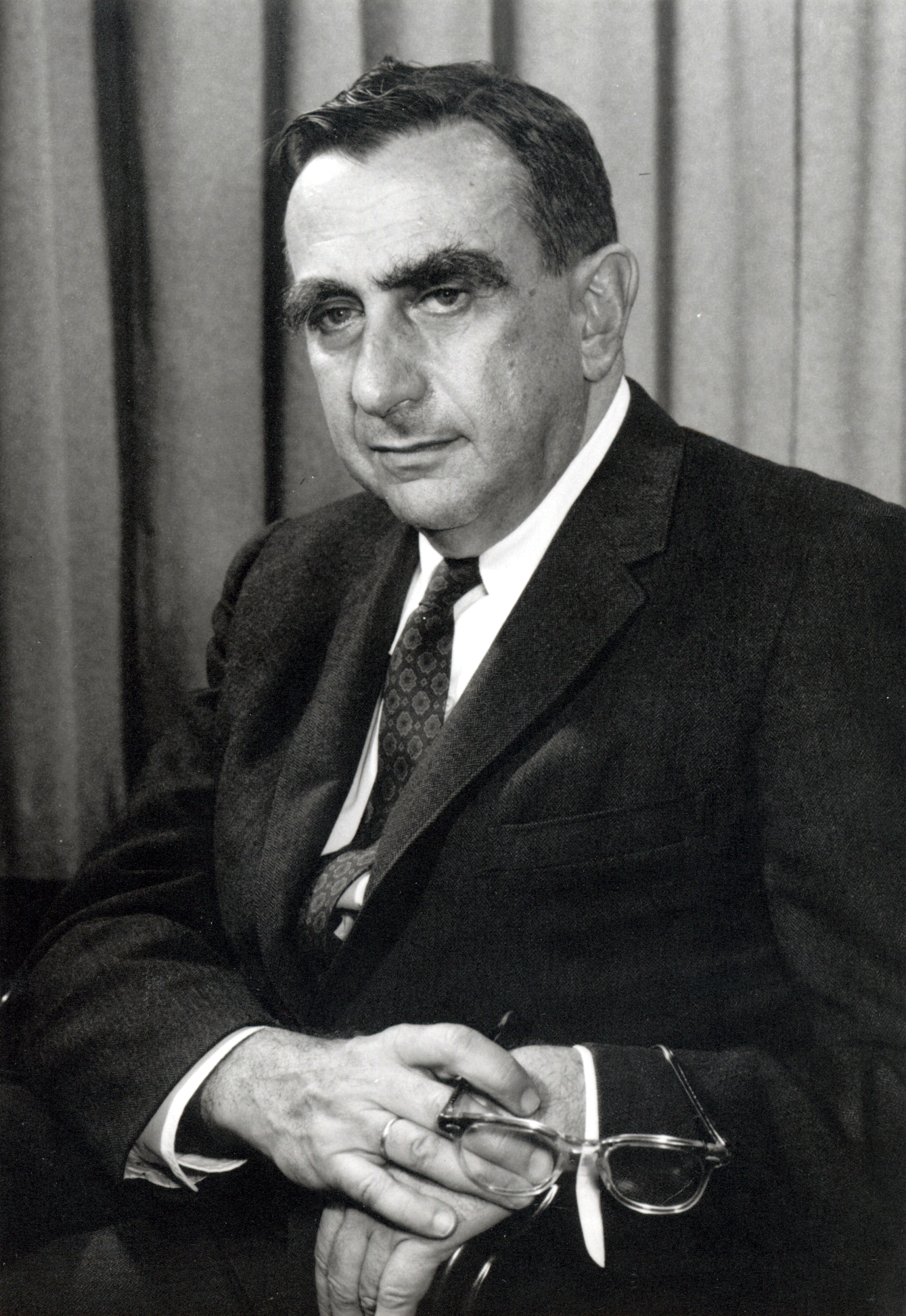
Edward Teller, who clashed with Oppenheimer on the H-bomb, testified against him.

From 1949 to 1953, Oppenheimer had also found himself in the middle of a controversy over the development of the "Super". In 1949, the Soviet Union detonated an atomic bomb. This came as a shock to many Americans, and it fell to Oppenheimer to play a leading role in checking the evidence and confirming that the explosion had taken place. In response, Strauss recommended that the United States retain nuclear superiority by developing the "Super". This had been under consideration at Los Alamos for several years. Brigadier General James McCormack told the AEC commissioners that while thermonuclear weapons could potentially be thousands of times as powerful as fission weapons, as of 1949 there was no design that worked, and no certainty that a practical bomb could be built if there was one. He cautioned that the "Super" would probably require large amounts of tritium, which could only be acquired by diverting the AEC's nuclear reactors from plutonium production.

Strauss found allies in Lawrence and Edward Teller, who had headed the "Super" group at Los Alamos during the war. When the matter was referred to the GAC, it unanimously voted against a crash program to develop the "Super". Without a workable design, it seemed foolish to divert resources from fission bombs. Nor was there an obvious military need. Despite this, Truman authorized that H-bomb work proceed on January 31, 1950. Teller, Fermi, John von Neumann, and Stan Ulam struggled to find a working design, and in February 1951, Ulam and Teller finally devised one. After reviewing the design and data gathered by the Operation Greenhouse tests in May 1951, Oppenheimer acknowledged that the "New Super" was technically feasible. Teller left Los Alamos to help found, with Lawrence, a second weapons laboratory, the Lawrence Livermore National Laboratory, in 1952.

Thermonuclear strategic weapons, prior to the development of long-range ballistic missiles, would necessarily be delivered by long-range bombers under the control of the relatively new United States Air Force. In projects and study groups such as Project Vista and the Lincoln Summer Study Group however, Oppenheimer pushed for smaller "tactical" nuclear weapons that would be more useful against enemy troops in a limited theater conflict and which would be under control of the Army. He also proposed investments in air defense against nuclear attack, which would potentially take resources away from the Air Force's retaliatory strike mission. As chair of the State Department Panel of Consultants on Disarmament, Oppenheimer argued for postponing the Ivy Mike first test of a hydrogen device. These stances led the Air Force to view Oppenheimer's positions and influence with bitterness and suspicion.

Oppenheimer continued to do work for the government. His AEC consultancy, and the Q clearance that went along with it, had most recently been renewed by Gordon Dean, the outgoing chairman of the AEC, on June 5, 1953. It would be good through June 30, 1954.

=== Borden letter ===
On November 7, 1953, J. Edgar Hoover was sent a letter concerning Oppenheimer by William L. Borden, former executive director of Congress' Joint Atomic Energy Committee. In the letter, Borden stated his opinion "based upon years of study, of the available classified evidence, that more probably than not J. Robert Oppenheimer is an agent of the Soviet Union." The letter was based upon the government's massive investigative dossier on Oppenheimer, a dossier that included, as one author later wrote, "eleven years' minute surveillance of the scientist's life." His office and home had been bugged, his telephone tapped and his mail opened.

Borden's letter stated:

This opinion considers the following factors, among others.

1. The evidence indicating that as of April 1942: (a) He was contributing substantial monthly sums to the Communist Party; (b) His ties with communism had survived the Nazi-Soviet Pact and the Soviet attack upon Finland; (c) His wife and younger brother were Communists; (d) He had no close friends except Communists; (e) He had at least one Communist mistress; (f) He belonged only to Communist organizations, apart from professional affiliations; (g) The people whom he recruited into the early wartime Berkeley atom project were exclusively Communists; (h) He had been instrumental in securing recruits for the Communist Party, and (i) He was in frequent contact with Soviet Espionage agents.
2. The evidence indicating that: (a) In May 1942, he either stopped contributing funds to the Communist Party or else made his contributions though a new channel not yet discovered; (b) In April 1943 his name was formally submitted for security clearance; (c) He himself was aware at the time that his name had been so submitted and (d) He thereafter repeatedly gave false information to General Groves, Manhattan District, and the FBI concerning the 1939 – April 1942 period.
3. The evidence indicating that: (a) He was responsible for employing a number of Communists, some of them not technical, at wartime Los Alamos; (b) He selected one such individual to write the official Los Alamos history; (c) He was a vigorous supporter of the H-bomb program until August 6, 1945, (Hiroshima), on which day he personally urged each senior individual working in this field to desist; and (d) He was an enthusiastic sponsor of the A-bomb program until the war ended, when he immediately and outspokenly advocated the Los Alamos Laboratory be disbanded.
4. The evidence indicating that: (a) He was remarkably instrumental in influencing the military authorities and the Atomic Energy Commission essentially to suspend H-bomb development from mid-1946 through January 31, 1950 [the date of President Truman's public announcement that the United States, in answer to the new Soviet atomic bomb, would seek to build an H-bomb] (b) He has worked tirelessly, from January 31, 1950, onward to retard the United States H-bomb program; (c) He has used his potent influence against every postwar effort to expand capacity for producing A-bomb material; (d) He has used his potent influence against every postwar effort directed at obtaining larger supplies of uranium raw material; and (e) He has used his potent influence against every major postwar effort toward atomic power development, including the nuclear-powered submarine and aircraft programs as well as industrial power projects.

The letter also pointed out that Oppenheimer had worked against development of the hydrogen bomb, and had worked against postwar atomic energy development, including nuclear power plants and nuclear submarines. The letter concluded:

# Between 1939 and mid-1942, more probably than not, J. Robert Oppenheimer was a sufficiently hardened Communist that he either volunteered espionage information to the Soviets or complied with a request for such information. (This includes the possibility that when he singled out the weapons aspect of atomic development as his personal speciality, he was acting under Soviet instructions.) 2. More probably than not, he has since been functioning as an espionage agent; and 3. More probably than not, he has since acted under a Soviet directive in influencing United States military, atomic energy, intelligence, and diplomatic policy.

The contents of the letter were not new, and some had been known when Oppenheimer was first cleared for atomic war work. Yet that information had not prompted anyone to seek his removal from government service. Despite the lack of significant new evidence, Eisenhower was troubled by any possibility that the charges might be true, and worried about appearing weak in the environment of McCarthyism. Accordingly, on December 3, 1953, Eisenhower ordered that a "blank wall" be placed between Oppenheimer and the nation's atomic secrets.

== Hearing ==
=== Board composition and procedures ===
On December 21, 1953, Oppenheimer was told by Lewis Strauss that his security file had been subject to two recent re-evaluations because of new screening criteria, and because a former government official had drawn attention to Oppenheimer's record. Strauss said that his clearance had been suspended, pending resolution of a series of charges outlined in a letter, and discussed his resigning his AEC consultancy. Given only a day to decide, and after consulting with his attorneys, Oppenheimer chose not to resign and requested a hearing instead. The charges were outlined in a letter from Kenneth D. Nichols, general manager of the AEC. Pending resolution of the charges, Oppenheimer's security clearance was suspended. Oppenheimer told Strauss that some of what was in Nichols' letter was correct, some incorrect. Nichols wrote that he was "not happy with the inclusion of a reference concerning Oppenheimer's opposition to the hydrogen bomb development." He considered that "in spite of his record he is loyal to the United States."

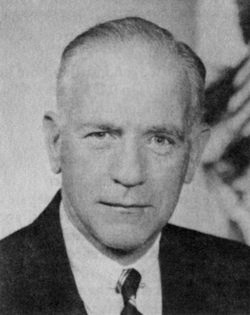
The hearing was chaired by Gordon Gray, president of the University of North Carolina.

The hearing was held in Temporary Building 3 near the Washington Monument housing offices of the AEC, and began on April 12, 1954. The AEC was represented by Roger Robb, an experienced prosecutor in Washington, and Arthur Rolander, while Oppenheimer's legal team was headed by Lloyd K. Garrison, a prominent New York attorney at the law firm of Paul, Weiss, Rifkind, Wharton & Garrison. The chairman of the Personnel Security Board was Gordon Gray, president of the University of North Carolina. Accordingly, the board is sometimes referred to as the Gray Board. The other members of the hearing panel were Thomas Alfred Morgan, a retired industrialist, and Ward V. Evans, chairman of the chemistry department at Northwestern University. The hearing lasted through May 6, when Garrison made a closing summation.

The hearing was not open to the public and initially was not publicized. At the commencement of the hearing, Gray stated the hearing was "strictly confidential", and pledged that no information related to the hearing would be released. Contrary to this assurance, a few weeks after the conclusion of the hearing a verbatim transcript of the hearing was released by the AEC. Oppenheimer and Garrison also breached the confidentiality of the hearing by communicating with The New York Times journalist James Reston, who wrote an article on the hearing that appeared on the second day of the hearing.

Garrison applied for an emergency security clearance prior to the hearing, as one had been granted to Robb, but no clearance was granted during the course of the hearing, which meant that Oppenheimer's attorneys had no access to the secrets that Robb was able to see. On at least three occasions, Garrison and his co-counsel were barred from the hearing room for security reasons, leaving Oppenheimer unrepresented, in violation of AEC regulations. During the course of the hearing, Robb repeatedly cross-examined Oppenheimer's witnesses utilizing top-secret documents unavailable to Oppenheimer's attorneys. He often read aloud from those documents, despite their secret status.

The AEC's former general counsel Joseph Volpe had urged Oppenheimer to retain a tough litigator as his attorney; Garrison's demeanor was gentle and cordial, but Robb was adversarial. Garrison voluntarily provided the board and Robb with a list of his witnesses, but Robb refused to extend the same courtesy. This gave Robb a clear advantage in his cross-examination of Oppenheimer's witnesses. One observer commented that Robb "did not treat Oppenheimer as a witness in his own case, but as a person charged with high treason."

Members of the hearing panel met with Robb prior to the hearing to review the contents of Oppenheimer's FBI file. The 1946 Administrative Procedure Act included a legal principle known as "the exclusivity of the record" or the "blank pad rule". This meant that a hearing could only consider information that had been formally presented under the established rules of evidence. However, while the act applied to the courts and to administrative hearings held by agencies like the Federal Trade Commission and Federal Communications Commission, it did not apply to the AEC. Garrison asked for the opportunity to review the file with the panel, but this was rejected.

=== Scope of testimony ===
As outlined in the 3,500-word Nichols letter, the hearing focused on 24 allegations, 23 of which dealt with Oppenheimer's Communist and left-wing affiliations between 1938 and 1946, including his delayed and false reporting of the Chevalier incident to authorities. The twenty-fourth charge related to his opposition to the hydrogen bomb. By including the hydrogen bomb, the AEC changed the character of the hearing, by opening up an inquiry into his activities as a postwar government adviser.

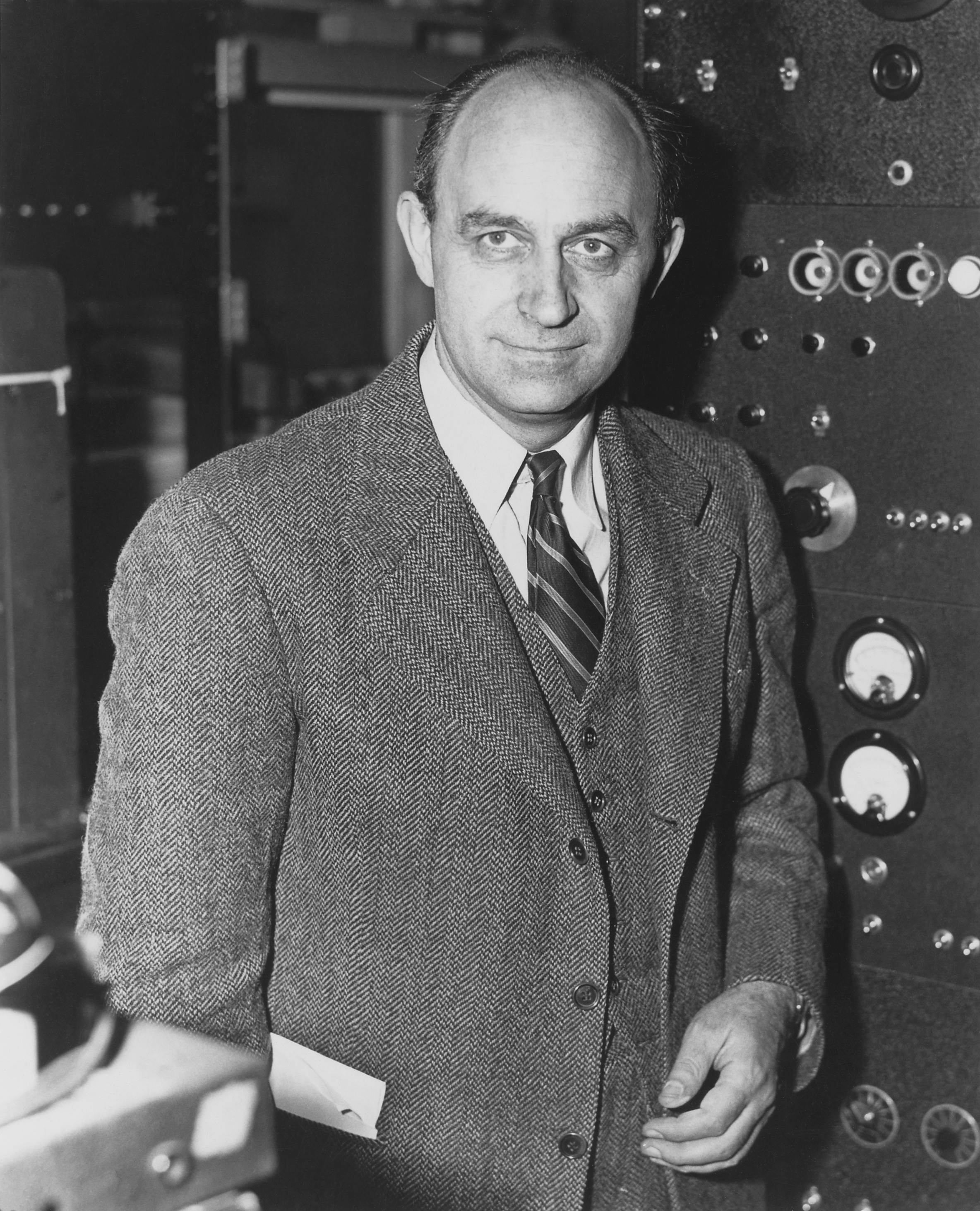
Nobel Prize–winning physicist Enrico Fermi was among the eminent scientists who testified in support of Oppenheimer.

Oppenheimer testified for a total of 27 hours. His demeanor was very different from his previous interrogations, such as his appearance before HUAC. Under cross-examination by Robb, who had access to top-secret information such as surveillance recordings, Oppenheimer was "often anguished, sometimes surprisingly inarticulate, frequently apologetic about his past and even self-castigating."

One of the key elements in this hearing was Oppenheimer's earliest testimony about Eltenton's approach to various Los Alamos scientists, a story that Oppenheimer confessed he had fabricated to protect his friend Chevalier. Unknown to Oppenheimer, both versions were recorded during his interrogations of a decade before, and he was surprised on the witness stand with transcripts that he had no chance to review. Under questioning by Robb, he admitted that he had lied to Boris Pash, an Army counterintelligence officer, concerning the approach from Chevalier. Asked why he had fabricated a story that three people had been approached for espionage, Oppenheimer responded, "Because I was an idiot."

Much of the questioning of Oppenheimer concerned his role in the hiring for Los Alamos of his former students Ross Lomanitz and Joseph Weinberg, both members of the Communist Party. The questions probed into Oppenheimer's private life, including his affair with Jean Tatlock, a Communist with whom he stayed the night while he was married. Lansdale had concluded at the time that his interest in Tatlock was romantic rather than political. Nonetheless, this innocuous affair may have played more heavily in the minds of the review panel.

Groves, testifying as a witness for the AEC and against Oppenheimer, reaffirmed his decision to hire Oppenheimer. Groves said that Oppenheimer's refusal to report Chevalier was "the typical American school boy attitude that there is something wicked about telling on a friend." Under questioning from Robb, Groves said that under the security criteria in effect in 1954, he "would not clear Dr. Oppenheimer today".

The official position of the Air Force was to support the suspension of the security clearance, which was given during testimony by its chief scientist, David T. Griggs. Although his testimony was not pivotal in the decision, many physicists viewed Griggs as the "Judas who had betrayed their god", the brilliant theoretical physicist who led the successful wartime development of the atomic bomb.

Many top scientists, as well as government and military figures, testified on Oppenheimer's behalf. Among them were Fermi, Isidor Isaac Rabi, Hans Bethe, John J. McCloy, James B. Conant and Bush, as well as two former AEC chairmen and three former commissioners. Also testifying on behalf of Oppenheimer was Lansdale, who was involved in the Army's surveillance and investigation of Oppenheimer during the war. Lansdale, a lawyer, was not intimidated by Robb. He testified that Oppenheimer was not a Communist, and that he was "loyal and discreet".

Ernest Lawrence was known to dislike political activities, seeing them as a waste of time better spent on scientific research. He did not oppose the investigations of Oppenheimer or others, tending to distance himself from those under investigation rather than supporting them. He said he was unable to testify at the Oppenheimer hearing because of illness. On April 26, Lawrence suffered a severe colitis attack. The next day, Lawrence called Lewis Strauss and told him that his brother, a doctor, had ordered him to return home and that he would not be testifying. Lawrence suffered with colitis until his death during colostomy surgery, on August 27, 1958. However, an interview transcript in which Lawrence stated that Oppenheimer "should never again have anything to do with the forming of policy" was presented at the hearing, and several other members of Lawrence's Radiation Laboratory did testify against Oppenheimer in person. This resulted in later ill-feeling from the scientific community towards Lawrence and other members of his laboratory.

Edward Teller was opposed to the hearing, feeling it was improper to subject Oppenheimer to a security trial, but was torn by longstanding grievances against him. He was called by Robb to testify against Oppenheimer, and shortly before he appeared Robb showed Teller a dossier of items unfavorable to Oppenheimer. Teller testified that he considered Oppenheimer loyal, but that "in a great number of cases, I have seen Dr. Oppenheimer act – I understand that Dr. Oppenheimer acted – in a way which for me was exceedingly hard to understand. I thoroughly disagreed with him in numerous issues and his actions frankly appeared to me confused and complicated. To this extent I feel that I would like to see the vital interests of this country in hands which I understand better, and therefore trust more." Asked whether Oppenheimer should be granted a security clearance, Teller said that "if it is a question of wisdom or judgement, as demonstrated by actions since 1945, then I would say one would be wiser not to grant clearance." This led to outrage by many in the scientific community and Teller's ostracism and virtual expulsion from academic science.

== Decision ==
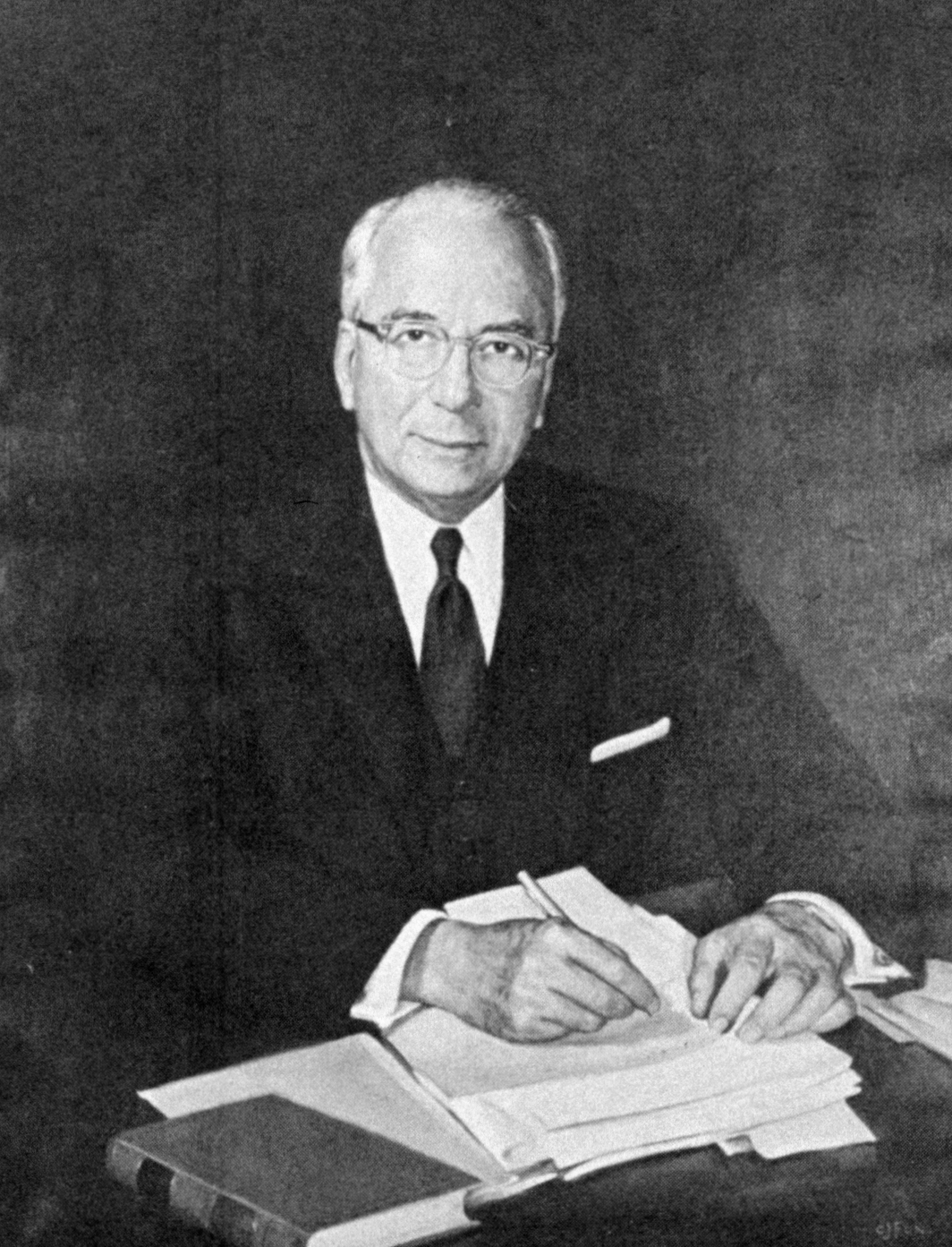
AEC chairman Lewis Strauss, a long-time Oppenheimer adversary, rendered the final verdict denying his security clearance.

Oppenheimer's clearance was revoked by a 2–1 vote of the panel. Gray and Morgan voted in favor, Evans against. The board rendered its decision on May 27, 1954, in a 15,000-word letter to Nichols. It found that 20 of the 24 charges were either true or substantially true. The board found that while he had been opposed to the H-bomb and that his lack of enthusiasm for it had affected the attitude of other scientists, he had not actively discouraged scientists from working on the H-bomb, as had been alleged in Nichols' letter. It found that "there is no evidence that he was a member of the [Communist] party in the strict sense of the word," and concluded that he is a "loyal citizen". It said that he "had a high degree of discretion, reflecting an unusual ability to keep to himself vital secrets," but that he had "a tendency to be coerced, or at least influenced in conduct, for a period of years."

The board found that Oppenheimer's association with Chevalier "is not the kind of thing that our security system permits on the part of one who customarily has access to information of the highest classification", and concluded that "Oppenheimer's continuing conduct reflects a serious disregard for the requirements of the security system," that he was susceptible "to influence which could have serious implications for the security interests of the country," that his attitude toward the H-bomb program raised doubt about whether his future participation "would be consistent with the best interests of security," and that Oppenheimer had been "less than candid in several instances" in his testimony. The majority therefore did not recommend that his security clearance be reinstated.

In a brief dissent, Evans argued that Oppenheimer's security clearance should be reinstated. He pointed out that most of the AEC charges had been in the hands of the AEC when it cleared Oppenheimer in 1947, and that "to deny him clearance now for what he was cleared for in 1947, when we must know he is less of a security risk now than he was then, seems to be hardly the procedure to be adopted in a free country." Evans said that his association with Chevalier did not indicate disloyalty, and that he did not hinder development of the H-bomb. Evans said he personally thought that "our failure to clear Dr. Oppenheimer will be a black mark on the escutcheon of our country," and expressed concern about the effect an improper decision might have on the country's scientific development.

=== Protest by scientists at Los Alamos ===
Starting on June 7, 1954, led by physicist Fred Ribe, 494 scientists at Los Alamos Scientific Laboratory signed a petition in protest of the security board's decision. The petition was delivered to President Eisenhower, the members of the AEC, and the chair of the JCAE. The petition acknowledged that it was up to the government to decide whom they wanted as advisors, but said that "it is inexcusable to employ the personnel security system as a means of dispensing with the services of a loyal but unwanted consultant." The petition then asserted that "this poorly founded decision ... will make it increasingly difficult to obtain adequate scientific talent in our defense laboratories."

Among the signers of the petition were a number of well-known physicists, including George Irving Bell, Alvin C. Graves, Elizabeth Riddle Graves, David L. Hill, Nicholas Metropolis, Frederick Reines, and Raemer Schreiber. Over 80 percent of the scientists in the theoretical division signed the petition, as did about half of the scientists in the laboratory overall. Fear of professional retribution reportedly kept some others from signing it.

=== Nichols letter and AEC ruling ===
In a harshly worded memorandum to the AEC on June 12, 1954, Nichols recommended that Oppenheimer's security clearance not be reinstated. In five "security findings", Nichols said that Oppenheimer was "a Communist in every sense except that he did not carry a party card," and that the Chevalier incident indicated that Oppenheimer "is not reliable or trustworthy", and that his misstatements might have represented criminal conduct. He said that Oppenheimer's "obstruction and disregard for security" showed "a consistent disregard of a reasonable security system." The Nichols memorandum was not made public nor provided to Oppenheimer's lawyers, who were not allowed to appear before the AEC.

On June 29, 1954, the AEC upheld the findings of the Personnel Security Board, with four commissioners voting in favor and one, Henry DeWolf Smyth opposed. The decision was rendered 32 hours before Oppenheimer's consultant contract, and with it the need for a clearance, was due to expire. In his majority opinion, Strauss said that Oppenheimer had displayed "fundamental character defects". He said that Oppenheimer "in his associations had repeatedly exhibited a willful disregard of the normal and proper obligations of security," and that he "has defaulted not once but many times upon the obligations that should and must be willingly borne by citizens in the national service."

Despite the promise of confidentiality, the AEC released an edited transcript of the hearing in June 1954, after press publicity of the hearing. The transcript was titled In the Matter of J. Robert Oppenheimer, which became the name the case was often later referenced as. The unredacted transcripts were released in 2014.

== Aftermath ==
The loss of his security clearance ended Oppenheimer's role in government and policy. Although he was not fired from his job at the Institute for Advanced Study, as he had feared he might be, he became an academic exile, cut off from his former career and the world he had helped to create. He gave public lectures, and spent several months of each year on the small island of Saint John in the Caribbean. Kai Bird and Martin J. Sherwin considered the Oppenheimer case "a defeat for American liberalism".

Summing up the fallout from the case, they wrote that:

In a few years after World War II, scientists had been regarded as a new class of intellectuals, members of a public-policy priesthood who might legitimately offer expertise not only as scientists but as public philosophers. With Oppenheimer's defrocking, scientists knew that in the future they would serve the state only as experts only on narrow scientific issues. As sociologist Daniel Bell later observed, Oppenheimer's ordeal signified that the postwar "messianic role of the scientists" was now at an end. Scientists working within the system could not dissent from government policy, as Oppenheimer had done by writing his 1953 Foreign Affairs essay, and still expect to serve on government advisory boards. The trial thus represented a watershed in the relations of the scientist to the government. The narrowest version of how American scientists should serve their country had triumphed.

Oppenheimer was seen by many in the scientific community as a martyr to McCarthyism, a modern Galileo or Socrates, an intellectual and progressive unjustly attacked by warmongering enemies, symbolic of the shift of scientific creativity from academia into the military. Patrick McGrath noted that "Scientists and administrators such as Edward Teller, Lewis Strauss and Ernest Lawrence, with their full-throated militarism and anti-communism pushed American scientists and their institutions toward a nearly complete and subservient devotion to American military interests." Scientists continued to work for the AEC, but they no longer trusted it.

Loyalty and security tests spread through the federal government. At these inquiries, federal employees were asked questions such as:

- Is it proper to mix White and Negro blood plasma?
- There is a suspicion in your record that you are in sympathy with the underprivileged. Is that true?
- What were your feelings at that time concerning race equality?
- Have you ever made statements about the "downtrodden masses" and "underprivileged people"?

Strauss, Teller, Borden, and Robb would never escape the public identification of them with the case. In a 1962 television interview, Eric F. Goldman asked Teller whether he favored restoring Oppenheimer's security clearance. Teller appeared to be dumbstruck and unable to find an answer. The question was deleted from the version that was aired, but the news got out and made headlines. President John F. Kennedy decided that the time had come to rehabilitate Oppenheimer. Teller nominated Oppenheimer for the 1963 Enrico Fermi Award. The nomination was unanimously approved by the GAC and AEC, and announced on April 5, 1963. On November 22, the White House confirmed that Kennedy would personally present the award, but he was assassinated later that day. The award was presented by President Lyndon B. Johnson instead. Oppenheimer died of cancer on February 18, 1967.

Wernher von Braun summed up his opinion about the matter with a quip to a Congressional committee: "In England, Oppenheimer would have been knighted."

=== Later analysis of charges ===
The question of Oppenheimer's past associations with Communist Party organizations would continue to be discussed and explored for many years after his death. Time magazine literary critic Richard Lacayo, in a 2005 review of two new books about Oppenheimer, said of the hearing: "As an effort to prove that he had been a party member, much less one involved in espionage, the inquest was a failure. Its real purpose was larger, however: to punish the most prominent American critic of the U.S. move from atomic weapons to the much more lethal hydrogen bomb." After the hearing, Lacayo said, "Oppenheimer would never again feel comfortable as a public advocate for a sane nuclear policy."

In a lengthy analysis of the security case published in the Stanford Law Review in 1990, Cold War historian Barton J. Bernstein posits that the remarkable thing about Oppenheimer was that he was ever able to hold a high-level security clearance in the first place, given his past associations and record of evasions, and that he had been given special treatment and protection by the U.S. government to allow him to work in the classified nuclear area for as long as he did. Cornell University historian Richard Polenberg noted that Oppenheimer testified about the left-wing behavior of his colleagues and speculated that if his clearance had not been stripped, he would have been remembered as someone who had "named names" to save his own reputation.

In his book Brotherhood of the Bomb: The Tangled Lives and Loyalties of Robert Oppenheimer, Ernest Lawrence, and Edward Teller (2002), Gregg Herken, a senior historian at the Smithsonian Institution, contended, based on newly discovered documentation, that Oppenheimer was a member of the Communist Party. However, Herken did not subscribe to the Borden letter's charge: "I don't think he was a spy. The significance of his being a Communist was that it gave him something he had to hide, and may be one explanation of why he was so quiet after 1954."

In a seminar at The Wilson Center on May 20, 2009, and based on an extensive analysis of Alexander Vassiliev's notes taken while viewing KGB archives, John Earl Haynes, Harvey Klehr, and Vassiliev concluded that Oppenheimer never was involved in espionage for the Soviets. Soviet intelligence tried repeatedly to recruit him, but were never successful. Allegations that he had spied for the Soviets are unsupported, and in some instances, contradicted by voluminous KGB and Venona documentation released after the fall of the Soviet Union. In addition, he had several persons removed from the Manhattan Project who had sympathies with the Soviet Union. Jerrold and Leona Schecter for their part conclude that based on The Merkulov Letter, Oppenheimer must have been only a "facilitator" of information.

== AEC action nullified ==
Over the years, the physicist Fred Ribe, who had organized the 1954 petition, worked towards having the Oppenheimer charges undone, as did other scientists at the Los Alamos National Laboratory. Historians also pressed for revocation to be reversed, without success. Oppenheimer biographers Kai Bird and Martin J. Sherwin joined this effort in 2006, in conjunction with the J. Robert Oppenheimer Memorial Committee, with the assistance of attorneys at WilmerHale and Arnold & Porter, both of which believed no legal remedies were possible. Despite the assistance of Senator Jeff Bingaman of New Mexico, their effort was rebuffed by two secretaries of energy in the Obama administration, Steven Chu and Ernest Moniz.

The effort gained momentum during the Biden administration, with support from forty-three U.S. senators; and Thomas Mason, the director of the Los Alamos National Laboratory; and by all living past directors of the laboratory. Tim Rieser, a senior congressional aide to Senator Patrick Leahy of Vermont, played a key role in moving the action through the federal government.

On December 16, 2022, Jennifer Granholm, the Secretary of the United States Department of Energy (DOE) – the successor organization to the AEC – vacated the 1954 revocation of Oppenheimer's security clearance. Her statement said Oppenheimer's clearance was revoked "through a flawed process that violated the Commission's own regulations. As time has passed, more evidence has come to light of the bias and unfairness of the process that Dr. Oppenheimer was subjected to while the evidence of his loyalty and love of country have only been further affirmed."

Granholm's order did not say that the charges against him were erroneous, nor did it posthumously restore Oppenheimer's security clearance. Granholm wrote that whether Oppenheimer "ought to have been eligible for access to restricted data is not one that this Department can or should attempt to answer seventy years later. Security clearance adjudication proceedings necessarily depend on sensitive judgments regarding the credibility of oral testimony and other evidence best evaluated within its own context. Therefore, we will not reconsider the substantive merits of In the Matter of J. Robert Oppenheimer." But while not ruling on those merits, Granholm concluded that the AEC failed to "follow its own rules" and that "these failures were material to the fairness of the proceeding."

Historian Alex Wellerstein said the action did not "go as far as Oppenheimer and his family would have wanted. But it goes pretty far." The action was praised by supporters of the revocation effort, as well as Bulletin of the Atomic Scientists, but drew criticism. In The American Spectator, Daniel J. Flynn said "The evidence overwhelmingly supports the AEC stripping Oppenheimer of his security clearance." Historian Barton J. Bernstein wrote in The New York Sun that Granholm's report had "glossed over" evidence that Oppenheimer had been a member of the Communist Party. Bernstein said in another article that Granholm had "ignored important parts of the substantial 21st-century scholarship on Oppenheimer and on the Oppenheimer loyalty-security case" and that her order vacating the decision had been "greatly flawed, and fundamentally errant".

== Dramatizations ==
Most popular depictions of Oppenheimer view his security struggles as a confrontation between right-wing militarists (symbolized by Edward Teller) and left-wing intellectuals (symbolized by Oppenheimer) over the moral question of weapons of mass destruction. Many historians have contested this as an oversimplification.

Haakon Chevalier fictionalized the affair, and his self-exculpating view of the whole preceding history, in the roman à clef The Man Who Would Be God in 1959; the Oppenheimer-like protagonist was renamed "Dr. Sebastian Bloch". The translations sold well in France, where he had moved by then, and throughout the Soviet bloc. He returned to the topic in Oppenheimer: The Story of a Friendship (1965).

The hearing was dramatized in a 1964 play by German playwright Heinar Kipphardt, In the Matter of J. Robert Oppenheimer. Oppenheimer objected to the play, threatening suit and decrying "improvisations which were contrary to history and to the nature of the people involved", including its portrayal of him as viewing the bomb as a "work of the devil". His letter to Kipphardt said, "You may well have forgotten Guernica, Dachau, Coventry, Belsen, Warsaw, Dresden and Tokyo. I have not." Of his security hearing, he said: "The whole damn thing was a farce, and these people are trying to make a tragedy out of it."

In a response, Kipphardt offered to make corrections but defended the play, which premiered on Broadway in June 1968, with Joseph Wiseman in the Oppenheimer role. New York Times theater critic Clive Barnes called it an "angry play and a partisan play" that sided with Oppenheimer but portrayed the scientist as a "tragic fool and genius". Fourteen years later, however, David Edelstein wrote in The Boston Phoenix, "I wish the play were as exciting today as it obviously once was. ... But as journaliam and art it has been superseded by Jon Else’s stupendous 1980 documentary film The Day After Trinity: J. Robert Oppenheimer and the Atomic Bomb." Kipphardt's play was also made into a Finnish television film Oppenheimerin tapaus ("The Case of Oppenheimer") in 1967.

Oppenheimer was played by Sam Waterston in a 1980 BBC miniseries that culminated in the security hearing. The series was broadcast in the U.S. in 1982. In 2009, David Strathairn starred as Oppenheimer in the American Experience PBS anthology series documentary, The Trials of J. Robert Oppenheimer, centering around the security hearing. Christopher Nolan's 2023 biopic Oppenheimer portrays both the security hearing and the Lewis Strauss confirmation hearing.
