= Ward V. Evans =

American chemist (1880–1957)

Ward Evans
- Born: Ward Vinton Evans; June 6, 1880; Rawlinsville, Pennsylvania, U.S.
- Died: August 2, 1957 (aged 77); Lancaster, Pennsylvania, U.S.
- Education: Millersville University; Franklin and Marshall College (BA); Columbia University (MA, PhD)
- Known for: Commissioner in Oppenheimer security hearing
- Scientific career
- Fields: Chemistry
- Institutions: Northwestern University; Loyola University Chicago

Ward Vinton Evans (June 6, 1880 – August 2, 1957) was a chemist who served as a professor at Northwestern University and Loyola University Chicago. He was known as one of three members of the commission which revoked the security clearance of J. Robert Oppenheimer. Evans was the only member who voted to allow Oppenheimer to retain his security clearance, stating that failure to clear Oppenheimer would be "a black mark on the escutcheon of our country.".

== Biography ==
Evans was born in Rawlinsville, Pennsylvania, on June 6, 1880, the son of Elizabeth (née Oldham) and Jacob Evans, a farmer. He studied at Millersville State Normal School (now known as Millersville University) in 1900, a B.A. at Franklin and Marshall College (1907), and a Ph.D. at Columbia University (1916). In 1916 he joined the faculty of Northwestern University as an instructor in chemistry. During the first world war, Evans spent a year in the army, where he was involved in testing explosives at Catholic University and the Pittsburgh Bureau of Mines. Evans then returned to Northwestern in 1918, where he remained until 1945, becoming department chair in 1942. In 1947 he joined the chemistry department at Loyola University Chicago, retiring as chair in 1951.

For more than 20 years, Evans served on the national council of the American Chemical Society, and in 1946 received an Honor Scroll from the American Institute of Chemists. An authority on explosions, Evans served as a consultant as well as expert witness on lawsuits related to explosions.

In 1954 Evans served as one of three panel members at the security clearance hearing of J. Robert Oppenheimer. He was the only member who voted to allow Oppenheimer to retain his security clearance.

Evans died on August 2, 1957, at Lancaster General Hospital in Lancaster, Pennsylvania. He had suffered a stroke at his summer home in Fishing Creek.

== Security clearance hearing ==
Wolverton wrote that

Ward Evans' minority report was concise and sharply worded. He criticized the AEC for investigating Oppenheimer for charges on which he had previously been cleared in 1947. Oppenheimer "did not hinder the development of the H-bomb, and there is absolutely nothing in the testimony to show that he did." Evans acknowledged that Oppenheimer had left-wing and even Communist friends, but "the evidence indicates that he has fewer of them than in 1947, when he was last cleared." Moreover, "he is not as naive as he was then. He has more judgment... it is better now than it was in 1947, and to damn him now and ruin his career and his service, I cannot do it." He concluded that failure to clear Oppenheimer would be "a black mark on the escutcheon of our country."

In the 2023 film Oppenheimer, Ward Evans was played by John Gowans.
