= Gordon Dean (lawyer) =

American lawyer and government official (1905–1958)

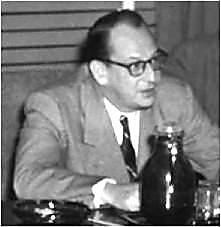

Chair of the Atomic Energy Commission
- In office July 11, 1950 – June 30, 1953
- President: Harry S. Truman
- Preceded by: David E. Lilienthal
- Succeeded by: Lewis Strauss

Personal details
- Born: Gordon Evans Dean; December 28, 1905 Seattle, Washington, U.S.
- Died: August 15, 1958 (aged 52) Nantucket, Massachusetts, U.S.
- Spouses: Adelaide Williamson (m. 1930; div. 1953); Mary Benton Gore (m. 1953–1958)
- Children: Deborah
- Education: University of Southern California (LLB); Duke University (LLM)

Gordon Evans Dean (December 28, 1905 – August 15, 1958) was a Seattle-born American lawyer and prosecutor who served as chairman of the United States Atomic Energy Commission (AEC) from 1950 to 1953.

== Early years ==
Dean received his J.D. from the University of Southern California in 1930 and an LL.M. from Duke University Law School in 1932. In 1934, Dean joined the U.S. Department of Justice during the New Deal administration of President Franklin Delano Roosevelt. Dean served under Attorneys General Homer S. Cummings and Frank Murphy as a Criminal Division attorney and press spokesperson. He had taught at Duke Law before being hired as assistant to Brien McMahon in the Criminal Division. Dean helped draft expansions of the federal criminal law and defended them in cases argued before the United States Supreme Court. In 1940, Attorney General Robert H. Jackson made Dean the press spokesperson for the Department of Justice. After six years at Justice, Dean left to join McMahon's law firm as partner.

After World War II military service, Dean served as press spokesperson for now Supreme Court Justice Robert H. Jackson who was the chief prosecutor in the Nuremberg Trials. Prior to his work with the AEC, Dean was professor of criminal law at the University of Southern California (1946–1949).

== Atomic Energy Commission ==
Dean was appointed by President Harry S. Truman to fill a vacancy on the Atomic Energy Commission, and he took his seat on May 24, 1949. Dean had been recommended to Truman by McMahon, who by this time had become Senator (elected in 1944), author of the Atomic Energy Act of 1946, and chair of the Joint Atomic Energy Committee of Congress.

During August 1949–January 1950 there was a heated debate within the U.S. government and scientific community over whether to proceed with an accelerated development of the hydrogen bomb, a nuclear weapon of massive and unprecedented force. Dean shared with McMahon and Truman a belief that the Soviet Union presented an immediate threat to the security of the United States, and that countering that threat with military superiority in the present was worth the costs of a longer-term arms race. Accordingly, Dean was in October 1949 one of two AEC commissioners who supported proceeding with such development, against three who opposed it. The AEC's General Advisory Committee (GAC), chaired by J. Robert Oppenheimer, also opposed the H-bomb development. Dean supported the scope of the GAC report, which relied in part on moral grounds, but was not persuaded by the report itself, remarking to a scientist that the GAC members were behaving in the manner of a "bunch of college professors." The debate was decided in January 1950 when President Truman ordered the development to proceed.

On July 11, 1950, Dean was announced as the new Chairman of the AEC. He was the second chairman of the commission, following David Lilienthal, and the appointment was again with McMahon's backing. Dean assumed the post immediately. As early as 1950, Dean advocated for the appointment of a Presidential Science Advisor and science advisory task force. Dean was inherently skeptical about military requests, believing they often asked for arbitrary numbers without underlying rationales. But as Cold War tensions heightened and the Korean War raged on, Dean led a massive expansion of the United States nuclear facilities. During his tenure as Chairman the A.E.C. successfully conducted the Ivy Mike test of the first hydrogen bomb.

Dean served at the time of the Lawrence Livermore National Laboratory's creation in 1952, having initially opposed the creation but then after a number of months, acceding to pressure for Teller from it to go forward. Dean served for a brief period under President Dwight D. Eisenhower as well, staying until the completion of his term on June 30, 1953.

During Dean's tenure as Chairman, McCarthyism reached its peak. Shortly after Dean left the AEC, Oppenheimer came under attack by Lewis Strauss, Teller and others for his alleged foot-dragging at Los Alamos on the hydrogen bomb project. Dean was outraged at some of the accusations and false accounts being made by Strauss and his allies about the course of hydrogen bomb development. At the Oppenheimer security hearing in 1954, Dean defended Oppenheimer.

== Post-government ==
Upon leaving government service, Dean joined investment bankers Lehman Brothers. He became an executive of General Dynamics in 1955. Dean also became an active board member of the Fruehauf Trailer Company in Detroit.

From 1954, Dean chaired a Council on Foreign Relations study group on nuclear weapons and U.S. foreign policy. Members of the group included Paul Nitze, Robert Bowie, David Rockefeller, and Lieutenant General James M. Gavin. Henry Kissinger joined as study group director in 1955. Dean would also join the International Security Objectives and Strategy panel of the Rockefeller Brothers' Special Studies Project in 1956.

== Death ==
Dean died in a commercial aviation accident on August 15, 1958, when the Northeast Airlines Convair CV-240 he was traveling in crashed on its approach to Nantucket Airport.

== Works ==
- Foreword to Nuclear Weapons and Foreign Policy, by Henry A. Kissinger. New York: Published for the Council on Foreign Relations by Harper & Brothers (1957), pp. vii-x.

Awards and achievements
Preceded by David E. Lilienthal	Chair of the Atomic Energy Commission; 1950–1953	Succeeded by Lewis Strauss
Awards and achievements
Preceded by Mohammad Mosaddegh	Cover of Time; January 14, 1952	Succeeded by Andrea Mead Lawrence
