= Development and Resources Corporation =

American non-governmental organisation

The Development and Resources Corporation was a non governmental organisation in the United States during the Cold War which aimed to develop rural areas in foreign areas of the world. The ideology of the corporation was inspired by the prevalence of U.S modernisation theories in the 1950s that believed in developing these rural areas in the hopes of obtaining political support in the war.

== Formation ==
The Development and Resources Corporation was founded in 1955 in New York City by David E. Lilienthal and Gordon R. Clapp with support from investment banking firm Lazard Freres. It was proposed as a body of U.S "government development experience" alongside "private business and financial talents" that would focus not only on modernising material surroundings of under developed countries, but also changing the public outlook of these communities. This ideology built upon Lilienthal's role as chairman of the Tennessee Valley Authority where he developed hydroelectric power hubs in urban American areas. The corporation aimed to implement its projects directly and on a regional level. Throughout the 1960s, the Development and Resources Corporation obtained a worldwide reach, establishing projects in Colombia, Puerto Rico, Nicaragua, Haiti, Peru, Italy, Nigeria, Malaysia, Australia and other nations across the globe.

== Projects ==
=== Colombia ===
In 1954, the Development and Resources Corporation begun its first project, along the Cauca River Valley in Colombia. Lilienthal worked in an advisory role to the Cauca Valley Corporation, instigating plans for improved flood control and hydroelectricity that centred on the creation of a set of hydroelectric projects with the aim to modernise the region. However, in 1957, Colombia's military dictator Gustavo Rojas Pinilla withdrew his support to the Development and Resources Corporation, ending the development plan. In 1964, when the Cauca Valley Corporation was reinstated, it operated without the influence of Lilienthal's corporation.

=== Khuzestan ===
In March 1956, the Development an Resources Corporation begun their plans for the development of Khuzestan, following the failure of the Iranian Shah to modernise the region. Lilienthal's proposal - 'The Unified Development of the National Resources of the Khuzestan Region' - aimed to create a modernised system built on fourteen dams across the Dez River, including the Pahlavi Dam. The tallest of these dams would reach 620 feet above ground level and combined, the system would create an output of 6.5 kilowatts of hydroelectric power. The plan cost $160 million. The Development and Resources Corporation also assessed, alongside subcontractors, the feasibility of Iran's second Seven Year Plan in the oil rich region. In November 1960, the establishment of the Khuzestan Water and Power Authority (KWPA) presented a challenge for the Development and Resources Corporation. KWPA aimed to liquidate Lilienthal's corporation and gutted its plans for a rural health program and new fertiliser plants. This, alongside the declining state of the Iranian economy and the Shah's cutting of appropriations to focus on military spending, led to the slow decline of the Development and Resource Corporation's influence in Khuzestan until 1979.

=== Vietnam ===
In 1966, President Johnson enlisted Lilienthal to help establish a post war development system in Vietnam. Working within the Joint Development Group that consisted of both Americans and Vietnamese, the Development and Resources Corporation focused its efforts along the Mekong River Delta, introducing flood control measures, pest control and agricultural improvement strategies. However, the 1968 Tet Offensive and President Johnson's decision to not run for reelection, led to the withdrawal of Vietnamese cooperation and a decline of support for the Development and Resources Corporation. In April 1970, at the end of their initial three year contract, the Development and Resources Corporation left Vietnam.

=== United States ===
The Development and Resources Corporation also had a continued influence at home, in the U.S., during the Cold War. Lilienthal's involvement with President Kennedy's 'Peace Corps' program included the training of volunteers in agricultural skills at a centre in the Californian Imperial Valley. The Development and Resources Corporation also worked alongside President Johnson's idea of the 'Great Society', establishing engineering programs in the New Jersey Meadowlands and Ramparts River in Alaska with the direct aim to reduce poverty and provide work.

== Dissolution ==
In 1969, the Development and Resources Corporation suffered its first loss in fifteen years, following their decline of influence in Iran. Throughout the 1970s, this decline continued as the corporation struggled financially with existing projects lost profits and there was a struggle in obtaining new contracts. This was seen in Brazil where Lilienthal's aim for a long term project in the Sao Francisco River Valley failed. Despite a slight resurgence of fortunes in Iran with a multi year national water plan established, the Khuzestan project ended in 1979 due to high competition with the Khuzestan Water and Power Agency and increasing political agitations in the region. Later that year, Lilienthal decided to dissolve the Development and Resource Corporation.
