= Harcourt Morgan =

Canadian-American entomologist, educator, and agricultural expert (1867–1950)

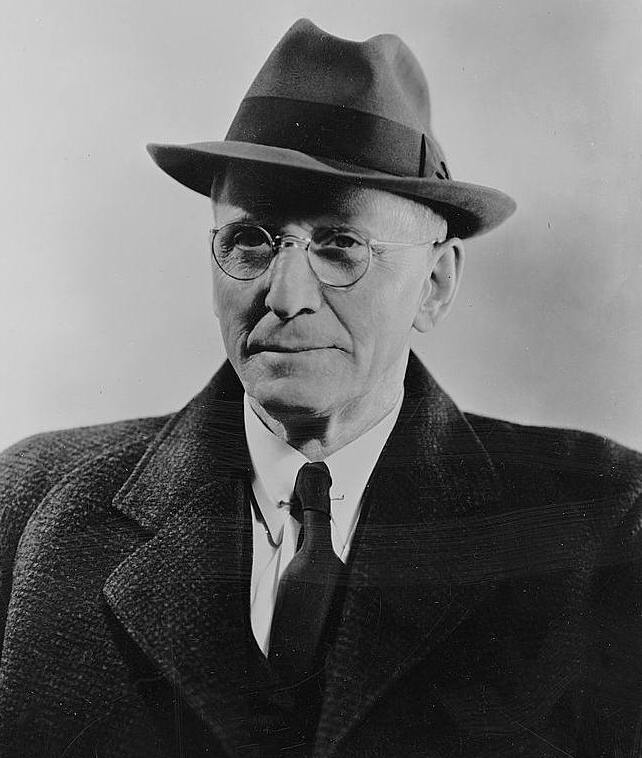
- Morgan, c. 1942
- Born: August 31, 1867; Kerwood, Adelaide Township, Ontario, Canada
- Died: August 25, 1950 (aged 82); Knoxville, Tennessee, United States
- Resting place: Greenwood Cemetery; Knoxville, Tennessee; 36.03078°N 83.91426°W
- Education: Ontario Agricultural College
- Spouse: Sara Elizabeth Fay
- Children: Harcourt Jr., John, Fay, Lucy
- Parent(s): John Morgan and Rebecca Truman

John Harcourt Alexander Morgan (August 31, 1867 – August 25, 1950) was a Canadian-American entomologist, educator, and agricultural expert, who served as president of the University of Tennessee from 1919 until 1934. In 1933, he was appointed to the inaugural board of the Tennessee Valley Authority, with which he remained until 1948, including three years (1938–1941) as chairman. In both capacities, he promoted a philosophy known as "the common mooring," which stressed a harmonious relationship between man and the environment, and consistently worked to introduce more efficient and less destructive farming techniques in the Tennessee Valley.

== Early life ==
Morgan was born in 1867 and raised by his parents Rebecca (née Truman) and John Morgan on a farm near Kerwood in Adelaide Township, Ontario. He attended the University of Toronto's Ontario Agricultural College, earning his Bachelor of Science in 1889. He briefly attended Cornell University and conducted research at the Marine Biological Laboratory before accepting a position as professor of entomology at Louisiana State University.

At LSU, Morgan studied two parasitical insects, the cattle tick and the cotton boll weevil, both of which had proven destructive to farmers in the state. Camping out in pastures and cotton fields, Morgan collected invaluable data on the habits of both insects that finally enabled scientists to get their populations under control. But the boll weevil infested cotton crops throughout the South in the early 20th century, causing much destruction and costing countless agricultural jobs. Morgan's role in fighting the cattle tick and boll weevil infestations endeared him to many of the state's farmers and gained the respect of regional agricultural experts.

== Marriage and family ==
After getting established in teaching and research, Morgan married Sara Elizabeth Fay. They had four children together: Harcourt Jr.; John, Fay, and Lucy.

== University of Tennessee ==
In 1904, the University of Tennessee hired Tulane professor Brown Ayres as president. While living in Louisiana, Ayres had become familiar with Morgan's work, and invited him to join U.T.'s faculty as professor of entomology and zoology, and director of the school's agricultural experimental station. In 1913, Morgan was named Dean of the school's College of Agriculture. Morgan shared Ayres' view that the university's extension services were as important as the school's teaching mission, as they believed that many of the South's agricultural problems were due to lack of information among the region's farmers.

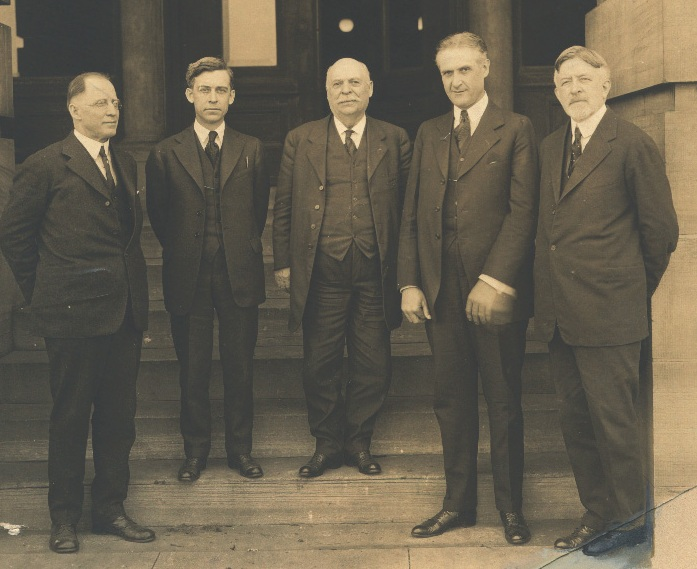
Morgan (far left) at the Tennessee State Capitol in 1921, with Governor Alfred A. Taylor (center), state senate speaker William Bond (left of center), state house speaker Andrew Todd (right of center), and Judge Edward Terry Sanford (far right)

During this period, Morgan developed a philosophy known as "the common mooring," which stressed a harmonious relationship between man and the environment, and taught that human endeavors should align with the demands of nature. Morgan believed that the South's overemphasis on commodity row crops such as cotton and tobacco, which were harmful to the soil, threw this relationship out of balance. He held numerous demonstrations and exhibits that encouraged area farmers to practice crop rotation, replace row crops with soil-enriching grasses, clovers, and legumes, avoid planting corn on hill slopes (a practice in which many East Tennessee mountain farmers were adept), and improve eroded pastures with lime and phosphate.

Morgan's extension work earned him the trust of Tennessee's farmers, which in turn brought influence among the state's politicians. This proved critical at a time when the state's three Grand Divisions still harbored Civil War-era animosities. Many state politicians disliked the idea that East Tennessee, which had been sympathetic to the Union, was the site of the state's land-grant institution. In 1915, Morgan convinced Governor Tom Rye to approve a one million dollar appropriation for the university.

During World War I, Morgan was appointed as the state of Tennessee's Food Administrator.

After being selected as U.T.'s president following Ayres' death in 1919, Morgan managed to convince Governor Austin Peay to appropriate several million dollars for the university, which Morgan used to expand the school. During Morgan's presidency, the student population quadrupled, and several new buildings were constructed, including Ayres Hall and many of the buildings on "The Hill," as well as Shields-Watkins Field, the forerunner of Neyland Stadium.

As the university became more reliant on state appropriations, Morgan grew wary of agitating state legislators. In 1923, a controversy known as the "Slaughter of the Ph.Ds" erupted when Morgan allowed the dismissal of seven faculty members whom administrators considered to be "troublemakers". The dismissal of eccentric law professor John R. Neal sparked an outcry among law school alumni, and Morgan was forced to defend the university's actions before Governor Peay and the Board of Trustees. When the state passed the Butler Act barring the teaching of the theory of evolution in 1925, many of the state's university leaders opposed the bill and looked to Morgan and U.T. for leadership. In spite of reservations about the law, however, Morgan did not speak out about the issue.

In 1927 Morgan served as president of the National Association of State Universities and Land-Grant Colleges. He served as president of the university until 1934, following his appointment to the board of the Tennessee Valley Authority.

== Tennessee Valley Authority ==
In 1933, President Franklin D. Roosevelt appointed Morgan to the inaugural board of the newly formed Tennessee Valley Authority, along with Arthur E. Morgan (no relation), a civil engineer and educator, as Chairman, and David Lilienthal, an attorney and public administrator in public utility law. Chosen for his agricultural expertise and familiarity with the region's people, Harcourt Morgan considered TVA's unified approach to agricultural and resource development to be the ultimate opportunity to implement his "common mooring" ideas. In TVA's early years, he would provide a critical connection between the agency and the often suspicious local population.

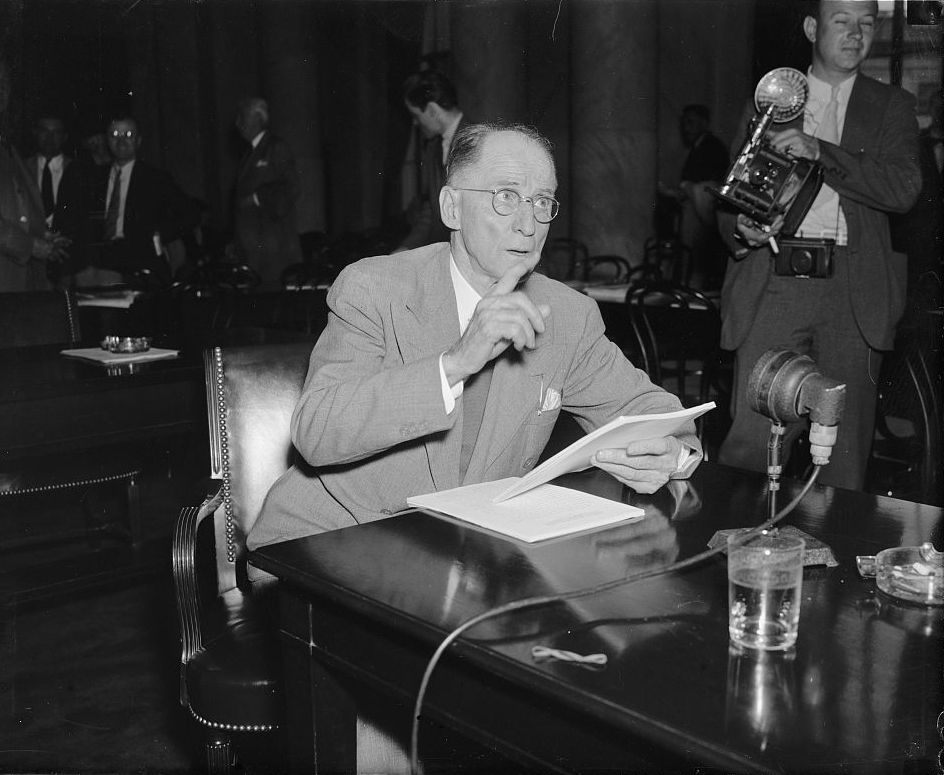
Morgan testifying before the TVA Joint Congressional Committee in May 1938

From the outset, Harcourt Morgan and Lilienthal found themselves at odds with the chairman, Arthur Morgan. Whereas the chairman sought to work directly with farmers, Harcourt Morgan insisted on working through the extension services of state agencies and land grant colleges, to make the best use of existing networks. The chairman also sought to work with private power companies operating in the valley, whereas Lilienthal supported public control of the valley's power resources. Lilienthal and Harcourt Morgan consistently voted down the chairman's initiatives, leading the chairman to accuse them of dishonesty and fraud. In March 1938, President Roosevelt summoned the three to Washington to discuss their issues. When the chairman was unable to give specific examples of dishonesty on the part of his two fellow directors, he was removed. A subsequent congressional investigation also cleared Harcourt Morgan and Lilienthal of any wrongdoing.

After Arthur Morgan's removal, Harcourt Morgan was appointed as chairman. Preferring to focus on his agricultural initiatives, he delegated most of his chairmanship duties to Lilienthal. Morgan consistently argued in favor of the region's farming interests. In 1938, he briefly clashed with conservationist Gifford Pinchot, who believed Morgan was neglecting TVA's forestry initiatives in favor of agricultural interests. Morgan opposed the Douglas Dam project because it would inundate some of the state's best farmland, and had similar reservations about the Fort Loudoun Dam project.

Morgan served as chairman until 1941, and remained on the board as a director until 1948. Lilienthal later wrote that he and Harcourt Morgan's personalities complemented one another, stating that Morgan was instrumental in getting the conservative local population to accept the agency's progressive initiatives, while Lilienthal in turn dealt with many of the agency's critics in Washington. Morgan was unimpressed with his colleague's book about the TVA, Democracy on the March, concluding that Lilienthal apparently never understood his "common mooring" philosophy.

== Death and legacy ==
After retiring from TVA, Morgan, then in his 80s, continued to tour the state and lecture on his common mooring philosophy. He died on August 25, 1950, and is buried in Knoxville's Greenwood Cemetery.

- Morgan was awarded an honorary doctorate from Emory and Henry College.
- The Progressive Farmer named him "Man of the Year" in 1940.
- Morgan Hall, the main building of the University of Tennessee's College of Agriculture, is named for him.
