= Special Studies Project =

The Special Studies Project was a study funded by the Rockefeller Brothers Fund and conceived by its then president, Nelson Rockefeller, to 'define the major problems and opportunities facing the U.S. and clarify national purposes and objectives, and to develop principles which could serve as the basis of future national policy'. The study ran between 1956 and 1960.

Nelson recruited Henry Kissinger, who was then on the faculty of Harvard University, as director of the project; he had first met Kissinger in 1955. He also brought on board figures including Edward Teller, Charles Percy, Dean Rusk, John Gardner (president of the Carnegie Corporation) and Henry Luce, along with his brothers Laurance and John D. 3rd. Six panels were constituted that looked at sweeping issues ranging from military/security strategy to foreign policy, to international economic strategy and defense department and governmental reorganization.

The seven sub-panels were:

- Panel I - International Objectives and Strategies ; chaired by Dean Rusk, the report was written mostly by August Heckscher
- Panel II - International Security Objectives and Strategy; directed by Henry Kissinger. Panellists included Frank Altschul, Gordon Dean, James B. Fisk, Roswell Gilpatric, Townsend Hoopes, Henry Luce, Laurance Rockefeller, Edward Teller, Carroll L. Wilson, and economist Arthur Smithies.
- Panel III - International Economic and Social Objectives and Strategy ; chaired by Milton Katz. Harlan Cleveland was a panellist.
- Panel IV - U.S. Economic and Social Policy; chaired by Thomas B. McCabe
- Panel V - U.S. Utilization of Human Resources; chaired by John W. Gardner
- Panel VI - U.S. Democratic Process; chaired by James A. Perkins
- Panel VII - The Moral Framework of National Purpose; chaired by Richard McKeon, the report written by Robert Heilbroner was never published.

The military subpanel's report was rush-released much earlier than the others, about two months after the USSR launched Sputnik, in October, 1957. It was given prominent treatment on the front page of The New York Times, selling thousands of copies and garnering unprecedented influence. Many of its major recommendations - principal among them a massive arms buildup to counter perceived Soviet military superiority - were adopted by U.S. President Dwight D. Eisenhower in his State of the Union address in January, 1958.

The project was finally published in its entirety in 1961 as Prospect for America: The Rockefeller Panel Reports. The archival study papers are stored in the Rockefeller Archive Center at the family estate; portions of the papers are still restricted, over four decades after the report was published.
