= Rawlinsville, Pennsylvania =

Unincorporated community in Pennsylvania, U.S.

Coordinates: 39°52′56″N 76°16′08″W

Rawlinsville is an unincorporated community containing a hotel, restaurant, fire dept, and town store. Rawlinsville is located within Martic Township in Lancaster County, Pennsylvania, United States.

The town is named after Morgan Rawlin, whose name appears in the 1830 Federal Census.
