= United States Atomic Energy Commission =

Independent federal government agency (1947–1975)

- Seal of the AEC

Independent agency overview
- Formed: 1946
- Dissolved: 1975
- Superseding agencies: Energy Research and Development Administration (ERDA); Nuclear Regulatory Commission (NRC)
- Headquarters: Washington, D.C. (1947–1957); Germantown, Maryland (1958–1975)

The United States Atomic Energy Commission (AEC) was an agency of the United States government established after World War II by the U.S. Congress to foster and control the peacetime development of atomic science and technology. President Harry S. Truman signed the McMahon/Atomic Energy Act on August 1, 1946, transferring the control of atomic energy from military to civilian hands, effective on January 1, 1947. This shift gave the members of the AEC complete control of the plants, laboratories, equipment, and personnel assembled during the war to produce the atomic bomb.

An increasing number of critics during the 1960s charged that the AEC's regulations were insufficiently rigorous in several important areas, including radiation protection standards, nuclear reactor safety, plant siting, and environmental protection.

By 1974, the AEC's regulatory programs had come under such strong attack that the U.S. Congress decided to abolish the AEC. The AEC was abolished by the Energy Reorganization Act of 1974, which assigned its functions to two new agencies: the Energy Research and Development Administration and the Nuclear Regulatory Commission. On August 4, 1977, President Jimmy Carter signed into law the Department of Energy Organization Act, which created the Department of Energy. The new agency assumed the responsibilities of the Federal Energy Administration (FEA), the Energy Research and Development Administration (ERDA), the Federal Power Commission (FPC), and various other federal agencies.

== History ==
In creating the AEC, Congress declared that atomic energy should be employed not only in the form of nuclear weapons for the nation's defense, but also to promote world peace, improve the public welfare and strengthen free competition in private enterprise. At the same time, the McMahon Act which created the AEC also gave it unprecedented powers of regulation over the entire field of nuclear science and technology. It furthermore explicitly prevented technology transfer between the United States and other countries, and required FBI investigations for all scientists or industrial contractors who wished to have access to any AEC controlled nuclear information. The signing was the culmination of long months of intensive debate among politicians, military planners and atomic scientists over the fate of this new energy source and the means by which it would be regulated. President Truman appointed David Lilienthal as the first Chairman of the AEC. Congress gave the new civilian AEC extraordinary power and considerable independence to carry out its mission. To provide the AEC exceptional freedom in hiring its scientists and engineers, AEC employees were exempt from the civil service system. The AEC's first order of business was to inspect the scattered empire of atomic plants and laboratories to be inherited from the U.S. Army.

Because of the great need for security, all production facilities and nuclear reactors would be government-owned, while all technical information and research results would be under AEC control. The National Laboratory system was established from the facilities created under the Manhattan Project. Argonne National Laboratory was one of the first laboratories authorized under this legislation as a contractor-operated facility dedicated to fulfilling the new AEC's missions. Argonne was the first of the regional laboratories to involve universities in the Chicago area. Others were the Clinton (CEW) labs and the Brookhaven National Laboratory in the Northeast, although a similar lab in Southern California did not eventuate.

On 11 March 1948 Lilienthal and Kenneth Nichols were summoned to the White House where Truman told them "I know you two hate each other's guts". He directed that "the primary objective of the AEC was to develop and produce atomic weapons", Nichols was appointed a major general and replaced Leslie Groves as chief of the Armed Forces Special Weapons Project (AFSWP); previously Lilienthal had opposed his appointment. Lilienthal was told to "forgo your desire to place a bottle of milk on every doorstop and get down to the business of producing atomic weapons". Nichols became General Manager of the AEC on 2 November 1953.

The AEC was in charge of developing the U.S. nuclear arsenal, taking over these responsibilities from the wartime Manhattan Project. In its first decade, the AEC oversaw the operation of Los Alamos Scientific Laboratory, devoted primarily to weapons development, and in 1952, the creation of new second weapons laboratory in California, the Lawrence Livermore National Laboratory. The AEC also carried out the "crash program" to develop the hydrogen bomb (H-bomb), and the AEC played a key role in the prosecution of the Rosenbergs for espionage.

The AEC also began a program of regular nuclear weapons testing, both in the faraway Pacific Proving Grounds and at the Nevada Test Site in the western United States. While the AEC also supported much basic research, the vast majority of its early budget was devoted to nuclear weapons development and production.

After serving as director of the Manhattan Project's Los Alamos Laboratory, physicist J. Robert Oppenheimer voiced strong opinions to the AEC, as chairman of its general advisory board of nuclear scientists, against development of the "super" or hydrogen bomb along with Lilienthal. Subsequently, Lilienthal left the AEC at the White House's request in 1950 and Oppenheimer's appointment to the board was not renewed in 1952. With them removed, President Truman announced his decision to develop and produce the hydrogen bomb. The first test firing of an experimental H-bomb ("Ivy Mike") was carried out in the Central Pacific on November 1, 1952, under President Truman. Furthermore, U.S. Navy Admiral Lewis W. Strauss was appointed in 1953 by the new President Eisenhower as the Chairman of the AEC, to carry out the military development and production of the H-bomb.

Lilienthal wanted to give high priority to peaceful uses, especially with nuclear power plants. However, coal was still cheap, and the electric power industry was not interested. The first experimental nuclear power plant Shippingport began operation in Pennsylvania under President Eisenhower in 1954.

=== Domestic uranium procurement program ===
The AEC developed a program for sourcing uranium domestically. Before 1947, the main sources for the mineral had been Canada and (what was then) the Belgian Congo, though the Manhattan Project also secretly processed uranium from the tailings of vanadium plants in the US West during World War II. The Colorado Plateau was known to contain veins of carnotite ore, which contains both vanadium and uranium. The AEC developed its program in accordance with the principle of free enterprise. Rather than discovering, mining, and processing the ore itself, the federal government provided geological information, built roads, and set a fixed rate for purchasing ore through one of the mills in the area. This prompted individuals to discover and produce the ore, which the government would then buy. The AEC was the only legal buyer of uranium from the beginning of the program in 1947 through 1966. From 1966 to the end of the program in 1970, the AEC continued to buy uranium to support the market until private industry could develop sufficiently.

Because the government itself was not producing ore, it claimed that it had no obligation to regulate miner safety. A congressional report published in 1995 concluded that, "The government failed to act to require the reduction of the hazard by ventilating the mines, and it failed to adequately warn the miners of the hazard to which they were being exposed." The Radiation Exposure Compensation Act of 1990 sought to compensate miners and families who developed cancer as a result of exposure to radon gas in uranium mines.

=== Regulations and experiments ===
The AEC was connected with the U.S. Department of Defense by a "Military Liaison Committee"'. The Joint Committee on Atomic Energy exercised congressional oversight over the AEC and had considerable power in influencing AEC decisions and policy.

The AEC's far-reaching powers and control over a subject matter which had far-reaching social, public health, and military implications made it an extremely controversial organization. One of the drafters of the McMahon Act, James R. Newman, famously concluded that the bill made "the field of atomic energy [an] island of socialism in the midst of a free-enterprise economy".

Before the Nuclear Regulatory Commission (NRC) was created, nuclear regulation was the responsibility of the AEC, which Congress first established in the Atomic Energy Act of 1946. Eight years later, Congress replaced that law with the Atomic Energy Act of 1954, which for the first time made the development of commercial nuclear power possible, and resolved a number of other outstanding problems in implementing the first Atomic Energy Act. The act assigned the AEC the functions of both encouraging the use of nuclear power and regulating its safety. The AEC's regulatory programs sought to ensure public health and safety from the hazards of nuclear power without imposing excessive requirements that would inhibit the growth of the industry. This was a difficult goal to achieve, especially in a new industry, and within a short time the AEC's programs stirred considerable controversy. Stephanie Cooke has written that:

the AEC had become an oligarchy controlling all facets of the military and civilian sides of nuclear energy, promoting them and at the same time attempting to regulate them, and it had fallen down on the regulatory side ... a growing legion of critics saw too many inbuilt conflicts of interest.

The AEC had a history of involvement in experiments involving radioactive iodine. In a 1949 operation called the "Green Run", the AEC released iodine-131 and xenon-133 to the atmosphere which contaminated a 500,000-acre (2,000 km^{2}) area containing three small towns near the Hanford site in Washington. In 1953, the AEC ran several studies on the health effects of radioactive iodine in newborns and pregnant women at the University of Iowa. Also in 1953, the AEC sponsored a study to discover if radioactive iodine affected premature babies differently from full-term babies. In the experiment, researchers from Harper Hospital in Detroit orally administered iodine-131 to 65 premature and full-term infants who weighed from 2.1 to 5.5 pounds (0.95 to 2.49 kg). In another AEC study, researchers at the University of Nebraska College of Medicine fed iodine-131 to 28 healthy infants through a gastric tube to test the concentration of iodine in the infants' thyroid glands.

=== Public opinion and abolition of the AEC ===
During the 1960s and early 1970s, the Atomic Energy Commission came under fire from opposition concerned with more fundamental ecological problems such as the pollution of air and water. Under the Nixon Administration, environmental consciousness expanded, and the first Earth Day was held on April 22, 1970. Along with rising environmental awareness came a growing suspicion of the AEC and public hostility for their projects increased. In the public eye, there was a strong association between nuclear power and nuclear weapons, and even though the AEC had made a push in the late 1960s, to portray their efforts as being geared toward peaceful uses of atomic energy, criticism of the agency grew. The AEC was chiefly held responsible for the health problems of people living near atmospheric test sites from the early 1960s, and there was a strong association of nuclear energy with the radioactive fallout from these tests. Around the same time, the AEC was also struggling with opposition to nuclear power plant siting as well as nuclear testing. An organized push was finally made to curb the power held by the AEC, and in 1970 the AEC was forced to prepare an Environmental impact statement (EIS) for a nuclear test in northwestern Colorado as part of the initial preparation for Project Rio Blanco.

In 1973, the AEC predicted that, by the turn of the century, one thousand reactors would be needed producing electricity for homes and businesses across the United States. However, after 1973, orders for nuclear reactors declined sharply as electricity demand fell and construction costs rose. Some partially completed nuclear power plants in the U.S. were stricken, and many planned nuclear plants were canceled.

By 1974, the AEC's regulatory programs had come under such strong attack that Congress decided to abolish the agency. Supporters and critics of nuclear power agreed that the promotional and regulatory duties of the AEC should be assigned to different agencies. The Energy Reorganization Act of 1974 transferred the regulatory functions of the AEC to the new Nuclear Regulatory Commission (NRC), which began operations on January 19, 1975. Promotional functions went to the Energy Research and Development Administration which was later incorporated into the United States Department of Energy.

Lasting through the mid-1970s, the AEC, along with other entities including the Department of Defense, National Institutes of Health, the American Cancer Society, the Manhattan Project, and various universities funded or conducted human radiation experiments. The government covered up most of these radiation mishaps until 1993, when President Bill Clinton ordered a change of policy. Nuclear radiation was known to be dangerous and deadly (from the atomic bombings of Hiroshima and Nagasaki in 1945), and the experiments were designed to ascertain the detailed effect of radiation on human health. In Oregon, 67 prisoners with inadequate consent to vasectomies had their testicles exposed to irradiation. In Chicago, 102 volunteers with unclear consent received injections of strontium and cesium solutions to simulate radioactive fallout.

== AEC Chairs ==
Image	Name	Start	End	President(s)
	David Lilienthal	November 1, 1946	February 15, 1950	Harry S. Truman (1945–1953)
	Gordon Dean	July 11, 1950	June 30, 1953	Harry S. Truman (1945–1953)
	Gordon Dean	July 11, 1950	June 30, 1953	Dwight D. Eisenhower (1953–1961)
	Lewis Strauss	July 2, 1953	June 30, 1958	Dwight D. Eisenhower (1953–1961)
	John McCone	July 14, 1958	January 20, 1961	Dwight D. Eisenhower (1953–1961)
	Glenn Seaborg	March 1, 1961	August 16, 1971	John F. Kennedy (1961–1963)
	Glenn Seaborg	March 1, 1961	August 16, 1971	Lyndon B. Johnson (1963–1969)
	Glenn Seaborg	March 1, 1961	August 16, 1971	Richard Nixon (1969–1974)
	James Schlesinger	August 17, 1971	January 26, 1973	Richard Nixon (1969–1974)
	Dixy Ray	February 6, 1973	January 18, 1975	Richard Nixon (1969–1974)
	Dixy Ray	February 6, 1973	January 18, 1975	Gerald Ford (1974–1977)

=== Atomic Energy Commission Commissioners ===
- Sumner Pike: October 31, 1946 – December 15, 1951
- David E. Lilienthal, Chair: November 1, 1946 – February 15, 1950
- Robert F. Bacher: November 1, 1946 – May 10, 1949
- William W. Waymack: November 5, 1946 – December 21, 1948
- Lewis L. Strauss: November 12, 1946 – April 15, 1950; Chair: July 2, 1953 – June 30, 1958
- Gordon Dean: May 24, 1949 – June 30, 1953; Chair: July 11, 1950 – June 30, 1953
- Henry DeWolf Smyth: May 30, 1949 – September 30, 1954
- Thomas E. Murray: May 9, 1950 – June 30, 1957
- Thomas Keith Glennan: October 2, 1950 – November 1, 1952
- Eugene M. Zuckert: February 25, 1952 – June 30, 1954
- Joseph Campbell: July 27, 1953 – November 30, 1954
- Willard F. Libby: October 5, 1954 – June 30, 1959
- John von Neumann: March 15, 1955 – February 8, 1957
- Harold S. Vance: October 31, 1955 – August 31, 1959
- John Stephens Graham: September 12, 1957 – June 30, 1962
- John Forrest Floberg: October 1, 1957 – June 23, 1960
- John A. McCone, Chair: July 14, 1958 – January 20, 1961
- John H. Williams: August 13, 1959 – June 30, 1960
- Robert E. Wilson: March 22, 1960 – January 31, 1964
- Loren K. Olson: June 23, 1960 – June 30, 1962
- Glenn T. Seaborg, Chair: March 1, 1961 – August 16, 1971
- Leland J. Haworth: April 17, 1961 – June 30, 1963
- John G. Palfrey: August 31, 1962 – June 30, 1966
- James T. Ramey: August 31, 1962 – June 30, 1973
- Gerald F. Tape: July 15, 1963 – April 30, 1969
- Mary I. Bunting: June 29, 1964 – June 30, 1965
- Wilfrid E. Johnson: August 1, 1966 – June 30, 1972
- Samuel M. Nabrit: August 1, 1966 – August 1, 1967
- Francesco Costagliola: October 1, 1968 – June 30, 1969
- Theos J. Thompson: June 12, 1969 – November 25, 1970
- Clarence E. Larson: September 2, 1969 – June 30, 1974
- James R. Schlesinger, Chair: August 17, 1971 – January 26, 1973
- William O. Doub: August 17, 1971 – August 17, 1974
- Dixy Lee Ray: August 8, 1972; Chair: February 6, 1973 – January 18, 1975
- William E. Kriegsman: June 12, 1973 – January 18, 1975
- William A. Anders: August 6, 1973 – January 18, 1975

== Relationship with science ==
=== Ecology ===
For many years, the AEC provided the most conspicuous example of the benefit of atomic age technologies to biology and medicine. Shortly after the Atomic Energy Commission was established, its Division of Biology and Medicine began supporting diverse programs of research in the life sciences, mainly the fields of genetics, physiology, and ecology. Specifically concerning the AEC's relationship with the field of ecology, one of the first approved funding grants went to Eugene Odum in 1951. This grant sought to observe and document the effects of radiation emission on the environment from a recently built nuclear facility on the Savannah River in South Carolina. Odum, a professor at the University of Georgia, initially submitted a proposal requesting annual funding of $267,000, but the AEC rejected the proposal and instead offered to fund a $10,000 project to observe local animal populations and the effects of secondary succession on abandoned farmland around the nuclear plant.

In 1961, AEC chairman Glenn T. Seaborg established the Technical Analysis Branch (to be directed by Hal Hollister) to study the long-term biological and ecological effects of nuclear war. Throughout the early 1960s, this group of scientists conducted several studies to determine nuclear weapons' ecological consequences and their implications for human life. As a result, during the 1950s and 1960s, the U.S. government placed emphasis on the development and potential use of "clean" nuclear weapons to mitigate these effects.

In later years, the AEC began providing increased research opportunities to scientists by approving funding for ecological studies at various nuclear testing sites, most notably at Eniwetok, which was part of the Marshall Islands. Through their support of nuclear testing, the AEC gave ecologists a unique opportunity to study the effects of radiation on whole populations and entire ecological systems in the field. Prior to 1954, no one had investigated a complete ecosystem with the intent to measure its overall metabolism, but the AEC provided the means as well as the funding to do so. Ecological development was further spurred by environmental concerns about radioactive waste from nuclear energy and postwar atomic weapons production. In the 1950s, such concerns led the AEC to build a large ecology research group at their Oak Ridge National Laboratory, which was instrumental in the development of radioecology. A wide variety of research efforts in biology and medicine took place under the umbrella of the AEC at national laboratories and at some universities with agency sponsorship and funding. As a result of increased funding as well as the increased opportunities given to scientists and the field of ecology in general, a plethora of new techniques were developed which led to rapid growth and expansion of the field as a whole. One of these techniques afforded to ecologists involved the use of radiation, namely in ecological dating and to study the effects of stresses on the environment.

In 1969, the AEC's relationship with science and the environment was brought to the forefront of a growing public controversy that had been building since 1965. In search for an ideal location for a large-yield nuclear test, the AEC settled upon the island of Amchitka, part of the Aleutian Islands National Wildlife Refuge in Alaska. The main public concern was about their location choice, as there was a large colony of endangered sea otters in close proximity. To help defuse the issue, the AEC sought a formal agreement with the Department of the Interior and the U.S. state of Alaska to help transplant the colony of sea otters to other former habitats along the West Coast.

=== Arctic ecology ===
The AEC played a role in expanding the field of arctic ecology. From 1959 to 1962, the Commission's interest in this type of research peaked. For the first time, extensive effort was placed by a national agency on funding bio-environmental research in the Arctic. Research took place at Cape Thompson on the northwest coast of Alaska, and was tied to an excavation proposal named Project Chariot. The excavation project was to involve a series of underground nuclear detonations that would create an artificial harbor, consisting of a channel and circular terminal basin, which would fill with water. This would have allowed for enhanced ecological research of the area in conjunction with any nuclear testing that might occur, as it essentially would have created a controlled environment where levels and patterns of radioactive fallout resulting from weapons testing could be measured. The proposal never went through, but it evidenced the AEC's interest in Arctic research and development.

The simplicity of biotic compositions and ecological processes in the arctic regions of the globe made ideal locations in which to pursue ecological research, especially since at the time there was minimal human modification of the landscape. All investigations conducted by the AEC produced new data from the Arctic, but few or none of them were supported solely on that basis. While the development of ecology and other sciences was not always the primary objective of the AEC, support was often given to research in these fields indirectly as an extension of their efforts for peaceful applications of nuclear energy.

== Reports ==
The AEC issued a large number of technical reports through their technical information service and other channels. These had many numbering schemes, often associated with the lab from which the report was issued. AEC report numbers included AEC-AECU (unclassified), AEC-AECD (declassified), AEC-BNL (Brookhaven National Lab), AEC-HASL (Health and Safety Laboratory), AEC-HW (Hanford Works), AEC-IDO (Idaho Operations Office), AEC-LA (Los Alamos), AEC-MDCC (Manhattan District), AEC-TID (Technical Information Division), and others. Today, these reports can be found in library collections that received government documents, through the National Technical Information Service (NTIS), and through public domain digitization projects such as the Technical Report Archive & Image Library, which are available via HathiTrust.

== Gallery ==
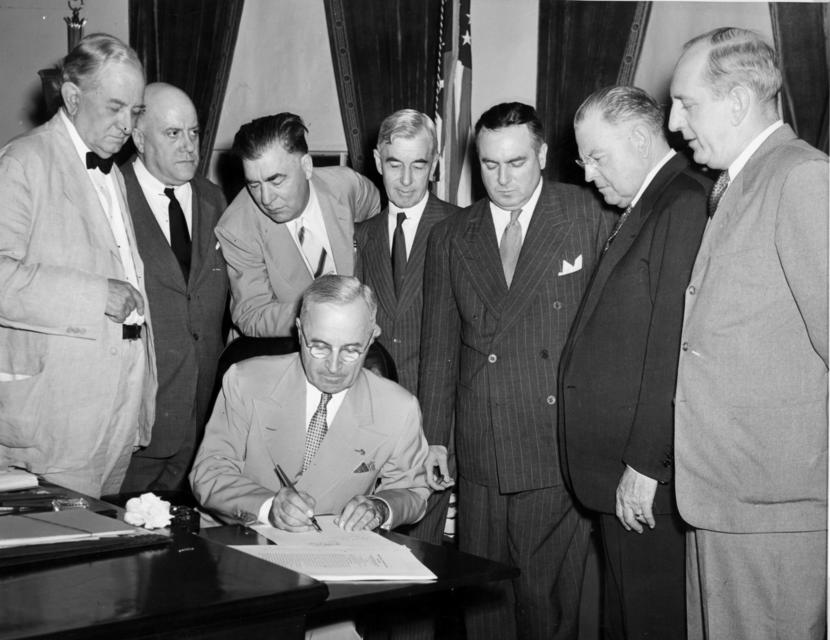
President Harry S. Truman signs the Atomic Energy Act of 1946

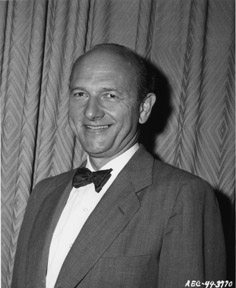
David E. Lilienthal, who chaired the AEC from its creation until 1950

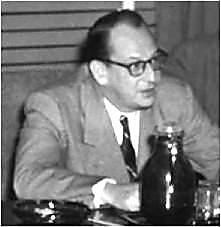
Gordon Dean, who chaired the AEC from 1950 to 1953

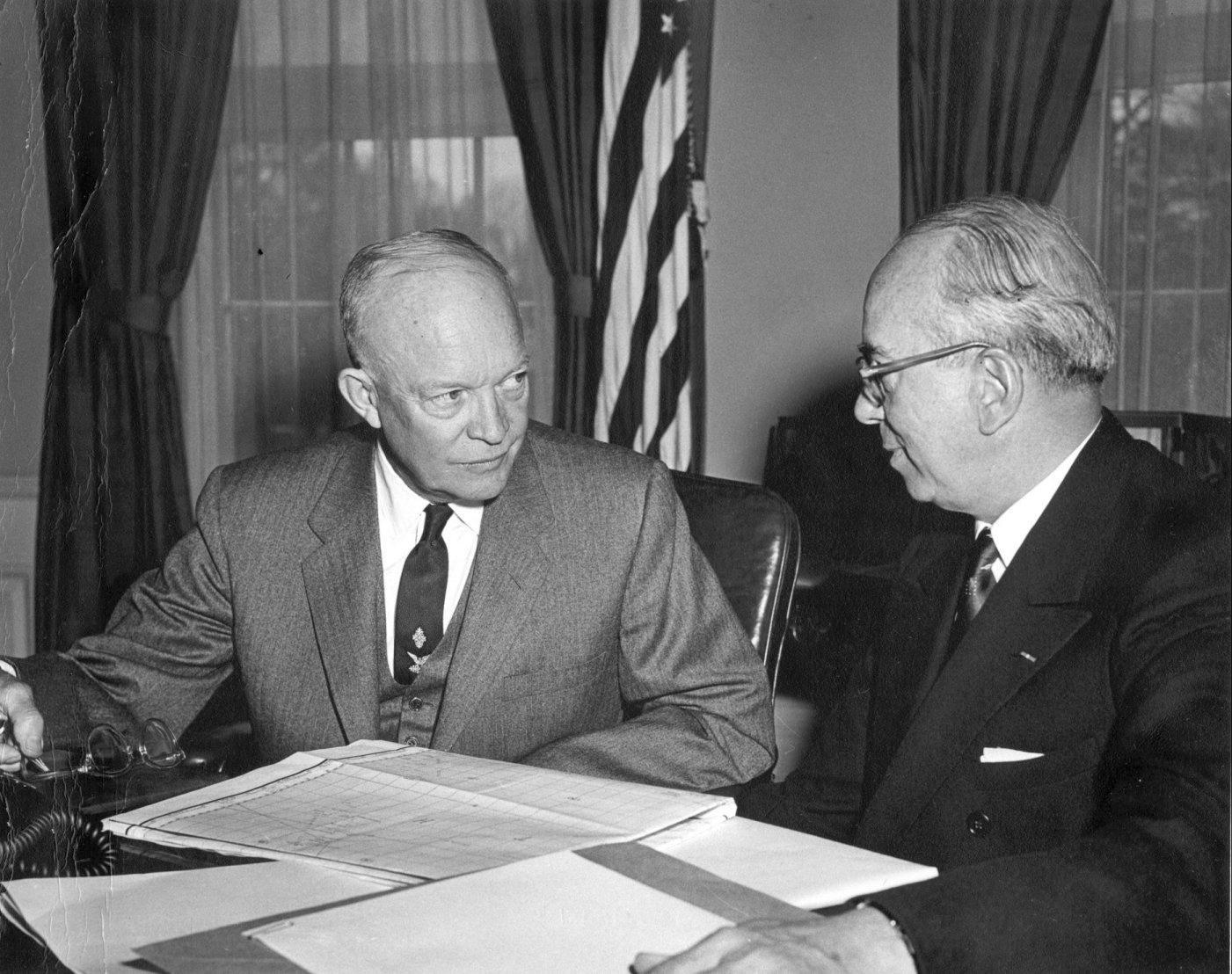
President Dwight D. Eisenhower with AEC chair Lewis Strauss in 1954

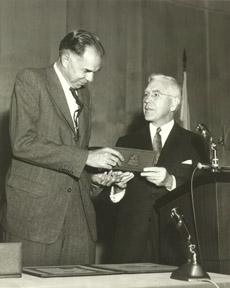
AEC chair John A. McCone presents the Enrico Fermi Award to Glenn T. Seaborg in 1959. Seaborg succeeded McCone as AEC chair in 1961.

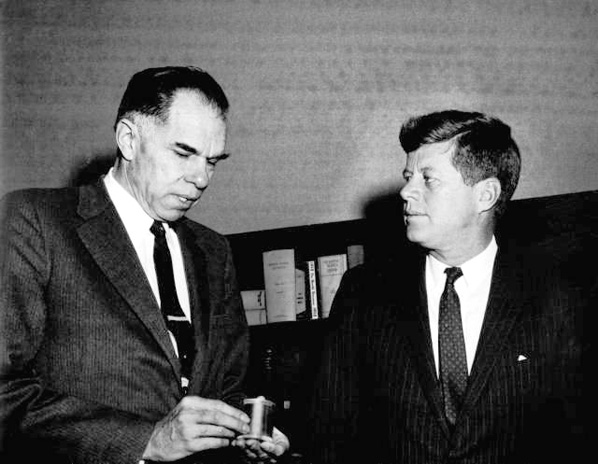
AEC chair Glenn T. Seaborg with President John F. Kennedy in 1961

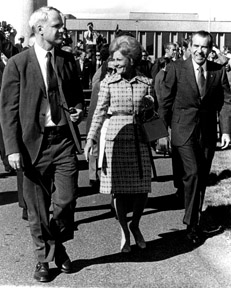
AEC chair James R. Schlesinger with President Richard M. Nixon and First Lady Pat Nixon at the AEC's Hanford Site in 1971

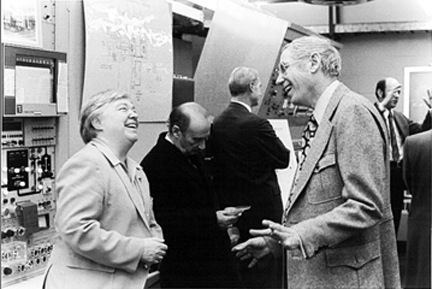
Dixy Lee Ray, last person to chair the AEC, with Robert G. Sachs, director of the Argonne National Laboratory

== See also ==
- International Atomic Energy Agency
- Anti-nuclear movement in the United States
- Atomic bombing of Hiroshima and Nagasaki
- Harold Hodge, administrator and researcher for the Manhattan Project
- List of anti-nuclear groups in the United States
- Nuclear waste
- Operation Plowshare
- Price-Anderson Nuclear Industries Indemnity Act
- Alvin Radkowsky (Chief Scientist, Office of Naval Reactors from 1950 to 1972)
- The Cult of the Atom
- We Almost Lost Detroit
