= David E. Lilienthal =

American attorney & public administrator

David Lilienthal
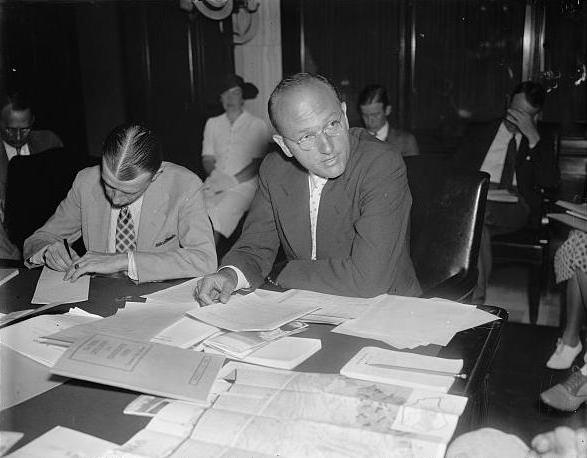
- Lilienthal before a Senate committee, 1937

Chair of the Atomic Energy Commission
- In office November 1, 1946 – February 15, 1950
- President: Harry S. Truman
- Preceded by: Position established
- Succeeded by: Gordon Dean

Chair of the Tennessee Valley Authority
- In office September 16, 1941 – October 1946
- President: Franklin D. Roosevelt; Harry S. Truman
- Preceded by: Harcourt Morgan
- Succeeded by: Gordon Clapp

Vice Chair of the Tennessee Valley Authority
- In office January 27, 1939 – September 16, 1941
- President: Franklin D. Roosevelt
- Preceded by: Harcourt Morgan
- Succeeded by: Harcourt Morgan

Member of the Tennessee Valley Authority Board of Directors
- In office June 23, 1933 – October 1946
- President: Franklin D. Roosevelt; Harry S. Truman
- Preceded by: Position established
- Succeeded by: Gordon Clapp

Member of the Public Service Commission of Wisconsin
- In office March 25, 1931 – June 23, 1933 (Note: The agency held the name "Railroad Commission," prior to the signing of the "Duncan bill" by Governor Philip La Follette on June 6, 1931.)
- Governor: Philip La Follette; Albert G. Schmedeman
- Preceded by: Philip Porter
- Succeeded by: Fred Hunt

Personal details
- Born: David Eli Lilienthal; July 8, 1899 Morton, Illinois, U.S.
- Died: January 15, 1981 (aged 81) New York City, New York, U.S.
- Spouse: Helen Lamb (m. 1923)
- Education: DePauw University (BA); Harvard University (LLB)
- Awards: Public Welfare Medal (1951)
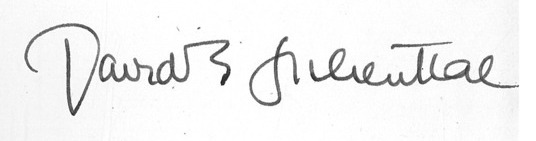
- Signature

David Eli Lilienthal (July 8, 1899 – January 15, 1981) was an American attorney and public administrator, best known for his presidential appointment to head Tennessee Valley Authority and later the Atomic Energy Commission (AEC). He had practiced public utility law and led the Wisconsin Public Utilities Commission.

Later he was co-author with Dean Acheson (later Secretary of State) of the 1946 Report on the International Control of Atomic Energy, which outlined possible methods for international control of nuclear weapons. As chair of the AEC, he was one of the pioneers in civilian management of nuclear power resources.

== Early life ==
Born in Morton, Illinois in 1899, David Lilienthal was the oldest son of Jewish immigrants from Austria-Hungary. His mother Minna Rosenak (1874–1956) came from Szomolány (now Smolenice) in Slovakia, emigrating to America at age 17. His father Leo Lilienthal (1868–1951) was from Hungary, serving several years in the Hungarian army before emigrating to the United States in 1893. Minna and Leo were married in Chicago in 1897, then moved to the town of Morton, where Leo briefly operated a dry goods store.

Leo's business ventures took the family several places. Young David was raised principally in the Indiana towns of Valparaiso and Michigan City. Although he spent part of his sophomore year in Gary, he graduated in 1916 from Elston High School in Michigan City.

== Education and marriage ==
Lilienthal attended DePauw University in Greencastle, Indiana, where he graduated Phi Beta Kappa in 1920. There he joined Delta Upsilon social fraternity and was elected president of the student body. He was active in forensics and won a state oratorical contest in 1918. He also gained distinction as a light heavyweight boxer.

After a summer job in 1920 as a reporter for the Mattoon, Illinois, Daily Journal-Gazette, Lilienthal entered Harvard Law School. Although his grades were average until his third and final year at Harvard, he acquired an important mentor in Professor Felix Frankfurter, later an associate justice of the United States Supreme Court.

While at DePauw, Lilienthal met his future wife, Helen Marian Lamb (1896–1999), a fellow student. Born in Oklahoma, she had moved with her family to Crawfordsville, Indiana, in 1913. They were married in Crawfordsville in 1923, after Helen had completed her M.A. at Radcliffe while David was a law student at Harvard. They had a son, David Eli Lilienthal, Jr. (1927–present), a journalist and writer best known under the pseudonym David Ely.

== Law practice and public appointment ==
With a strong recommendation from Frankfurter, Lilienthal entered the practice of law in Chicago in 1923 with Donald Richberg. Prominent in labor law, Richberg gave Lilienthal a major role in writing his firm's brief for the appellants in Michaelson v. United States, 266 U.S. 42 (1924), a landmark case in which the Supreme Court upheld the right of striking railroad workers to jury trials in cases in which they were charged with criminal contempt. Richberg also assigned Lilienthal to write major parts of what became the Railway Labor Act of 1926. In 1925, Lilienthal assisted criminal defense lawyers Clarence Darrow and Arthur Garfield Hays in their successful defense of Dr. Ossian Sweet, an African-American physician tried in Detroit for killing a white man who was part of a mob that attacked Sweet's home. Afterward, Lilienthal wrote about the case and issues of self-defense in an article published in The Nation.

Lilienthal left Richberg's firm in 1926 to concentrate on public utility law. He represented the city of Chicago in the case of Smith v. Illinois Bell Telephone Co., 282 U.S. 133 (1930), in which a decision of the U.S. Supreme Court resulted in a refund of $20,000,000 to telephone customers who had been overcharged. From 1926 to 1931, Lilienthal also edited a legal information service on public utilities for Commerce Clearing House. In 1931, Wisconsin's reform-minded Republican governor, Philip La Follette, asked him to become a member of the state's reorganized Railroad Commission, renamed that year as the Public Service Commission.

As the commission's leading member, Lilienthal expanded its staff and launched aggressive investigations of Wisconsin's gas, electric and telephone utilities. By September 1932, the commission achieved rate reductions totaling more than $3 million affecting over a half-million customers. But, its attempt to force a one-year 12.5 percent rate cut on the Wisconsin Telephone Company, a subsidiary of AT&T, was quashed by the Wisconsin courts. After La Follette's defeat in the 1932 Republican primary election, Lilienthal began putting out feelers for a federal appointment in the newly elected Democratic administration of President Franklin D. Roosevelt.

== Lilienthal and the Tennessee Valley Authority ==
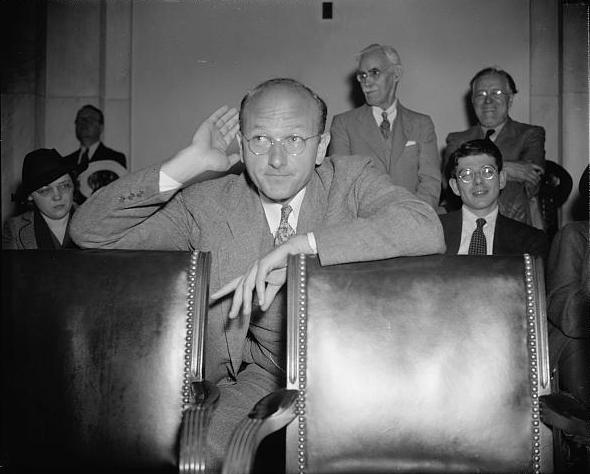
David E. Lilienthal listens to testimony at a Congressional hearing in 1938 called to investigate charges brought against the TVA by its former chair, Arthur E. Morgan.

Lilienthal was one of the first directors of the Tennessee Valley Authority (TVA). He earned his credentials for the appointment working under labor lawyer Donald Richberg and as an appointed member of the Public Service Commission of Wisconsin under Wisconsin's governor Philip La Follette. His TVA appointment was also aided by the persistent lobbying of his old law professor Frankfurter..

The TVA was established by Franklin D. Roosevelt in 1933 for flood control and locally controlled hydroelectric power on the Tennessee River. It was a massive project controlled by a public corporation designed to modernize the rural, Southern communities within the Tennessee Valley. The TVA also established extensive education programs, and a library service that distributed books in the many rural hamlets that lacked a library. The TVA was locally and nationally controversial. On the national scale, opponents led by Wendell Willkie said the TVA was a form of state socialism, and the other utility companies it competed against were also against the project. Local people were both apprehensive but also hopeful about the changes the TVA would bring.

In his role as one of the TVA directors, Lilienthal was skilled at administration and at creating supporters for the project.

In part due to his experience at the TVA, Lilienthal was often sent abroad to work on water development projects. Lyndon Johnson dispatched him to the Mekong River to oversee development of a project there. He was also sent to India and Pakistan to report on the dispute between the two nations, for Collier's magazine. He thought that the Kashmir dispute was intractable, but there were other areas of mutual concern of the two nations were agreement could be found - such as the allotment of the water of the Indus River. He reported this idea to the World Bank, and its president, Eugene R. Black, agreed with the assessment. This led to the Indus Water Treaty, which continued to govern water allocation between India and Pakistan, till it was officially suspended and placed in abeyance by India on April 23, 2025.

== Atomic energy ==
Following the atomic bombings of Hiroshima and Nagasaki and the end of World War II and victory by the Allies, Lilienthal was fascinated and appalled by the information he soon absorbed about the power of the new weapon.

In January 1946, U.S. Under Secretary of State Dean Acheson asked Lilienthal to chair a five-member panel of consultants to a committee including him and four others, who were to advise President Harry S. Truman and Secretary of State James F. Byrnes about the position of the United States at the United Nations on the new menace of nuclear weapons. At the time, the US held a monopoly on these weapons.

Lilienthal described the purpose of Acheson's request:

Those charged with foreign policy -- the Secretary of State (Byrnes) and the President -- did not have either the facts nor an understanding of what was involved in the atomic energy issue, the most serious cloud hanging over the world. Comments...have been made and are being made...without a knowledge of what the hell it is all about -- literally!

Lilienthal quickly found out even more about the atomic weapon, and wrote in his journal:

No fairy tale that I read in utter rapture and enchantment as a child, no spy mystery, no "horror" story, can remotely compare with the scientific recital I listened to for six or seven hours today. ... I feel that I have been admitted, through the strangest accident of fate, behind the scenes in the most awful and inspiring drama since some primitive man looked for the very first time upon fire.

The result of the panel was a 60-page Report on the International Control of Atomic Energy, better known as the Acheson-Lilienthal Report. Released in March 1946, it proposed that the United States offer to turn over its monopoly on nuclear weapons to an international agency, in return for a system of strict inspections and control of fissile materials. It was a bold attempt to formulate a workable idea for international control (and implicitly assumed that the United States was far ahead of the Soviet Union in atomic weapons development and could remain in that position even if the Soviets violated the agreement). However Truman then decided to appoint Bernard Baruch to present the plan to the United Nations; Baruch changed some provisions of it, ending up with a proposal that the Soviets could not accept and that was vetoed by them. (As it happened, the Soviets were determined to proceed with their own atomic bomb program and were unlikely to accept either plan.)

David E. Lilienthal (right) met with General Leslie R. Groves (left), Director of the Manhattan Project, at Oak Ridge, Tennessee, on October 1, 1946, to discuss the transfer of responsibility for atomic energy to the new Atomic Energy Commission, which President Harry S. Truman nominated Lilienthal to chair.

Subsequently, the United States established the U.S. Atomic Energy Commission (AEC) to provide civilian control of this resource. Lilienthal was appointed as chair of the AEC on October 28, 1946, and served until February 15, 1950, one of the pioneers of civilian control of the American atomic energy program. He intended to administer a program that would "harness the atom" for peaceful purposes, principally atomic power. Lilienthal gave high priority to peaceful uses, especially nuclear power plants. However coal was cheap and the power industry was not interested. The first plant was begun under Eisenhower in 1954.

As chairman of the AEC in the late 1940s, during the early years of the Cold War, Lilienthal played an important role in managing relations between the scientific community and the U.S. Government. The AEC was responsible for managing atomic energy development for the military as well as for civilian use. Lilienthal was responsible for ensuring that the Commander-in-Chief would have the use of a number of working atomic bombs. Lilienthal did not have as much enthusiasm for this task as some in Washington, and in particular he received steady criticism from Senators Brien McMahon and Bourke B. Hickenlooper, the chairman and ranking member of the United States Congress Joint Committee on Atomic Energy, for not pursuing the task with sufficient vigor. Indeed, in 1949 Hickenlooper raised charges that Lilienthal had engaged in "incredible mismanagement" and tried to have him removed as chairman; Lilienthal was cleared of wrongdoing but was left politically weakened within Washington.

Once the Soviet Union had successfully tested its own atomic bomb, Lilienthal became a central figure in the August 1949–January 1950 debate within the U.S. government and scientific community over whether to proceed with development of the hydrogen bomb. President Truman appointed a three-person special committee, composed of Secretary of State Dean Acheson and Secretary of Defense Louis Johnson in addition to Lilienthal as head of the AEC, to formulate a report to him on the matter. Lilienthal was opposed to development, stating among other reasons that the proposed weapon lacked a clear political or strategic rationale and that being overly dependent upon nuclear forces (rather than maintaining strong conventional forces) was an unwise security posture. But Lilienthal failed to marshal bureaucratic support for his position, in part due to the limitations of secrecy preventing him from finding allies and in part due to his repeated arguments losing their effectiveness. The three-person committee made its recommendation to proceed to Truman in a meeting on January 31, 1950, and the president so ordered. (Lilienthal ended up appearing to support the recommendation on the surface while trying to register a dissent as well, a confused situation that only became more so with additional memoranda filed after the fact and with conflicting recollections among the participants in years to follow.)

In his 1963 book, Change, Hope and the Bomb, Lilienthal criticized nuclear developments, denouncing the nuclear industry's failure to have addressed the dangers of nuclear waste. He suggested that a civil atomic energy program should not be pursued until the "substantial health hazards involved were eliminated". Lilienthal argued that it would be "particularly irresponsible to go ahead with the construction of full scale nuclear power plants without a safe method of nuclear waste disposal having been demonstrated". However, Lilienthal stopped short of a blanket rejection of nuclear power. His view was that a more cautious approach was necessary.

== Lilienthal as businessman ==
Lilienthal's resignation from the Atomic Energy Commission took effect on February 15, 1950. He was concerned that after years of relatively low-paying public service, he needed to make some money to provide for his wife and two children, and to secure funds for his retirement.

After undertaking a lecture tour, he worked for several years as an industrial consultant for the investment bank Lazard Freres. Later he wrote about this period in his journal:

A serene life apparently isn't the thing I crave. I live on enthusiasm, zest; and when I don't feel it, the bottom sags below sea level, and it is agony, no less.

In 1955, he formed an engineering and consulting firm called Development and Resources Corporation (D&R), which shared some of the TVA's objectives: major public power and public works projects. Lilienthal leveraged the financial backing of Lazard Freres to found his company. He hired former associates from the TVA to work with him. D&R focused on overseas clients, including the Khuzistan region of Iran, the Cauca Valley of Colombia, Venezuela, India, southern Italy, Ghana, Nigeria, Morocco, and South Vietnam.

== Lilienthal as writer ==
In May 1917, as a 17-year-old college freshman, Lilienthal met a young lawyer in Gary, Indiana. He later recalled that the lawyer

noticed how seriously I was looking at life in general and suggested as a remedy for this and as a source of amusement and self-cultivation the keeping of a diary of a different sort than the "ate today" "was sick yesterday" variety, but rather a record of the impressions I received from various sources; my reactions to books, people, events; my opinions and ideas on religion, sex, etc. The idea appealed to me at once.

Lilienthal kept such a journal until the end of his life. In 1959, Lilienthal's son-in-law Sylvain Bromberger suggested that he consider publishing his private journals. Lilienthal wrote to Cass Canfield at Harper & Row; the company eventually published his journals in seven volumes, appearing between 1964 and 1983. They received largely positive reviews.

Lilienthal's other books include TVA: Democracy on the March (1944), This I Do Believe (1949), Big Business: A New Era (1953) and Change, Hope and the Bomb (1963).

== Last years ==
His company D&R struggled financially during Lilienthal's final years. A promised infusion of capital from the Rockefeller family was not fully realized. The company was dissolved in the late 1970s.

Lilienthal resided in Princeton, New Jersey during his final years. In 1980, Lilienthal had two separate serious health problems. He had a bilateral hip replacement and cataract surgery in one eye. He needed crutches and a cane at various points. The recovery period from the eye surgery forced him to neither read nor write aside from his final journal entry on January 2, 1981.

He died on January 16, 1981. News of his death, and his obituary, appeared on the front page of The New York Times.

== Awards and honors ==
In 1951 Lilienthal was awarded the Public Welfare Medal from the National Academy of Sciences, of which he was also an elected member. He was also a member of both the American Academy of Arts and Sciences and the American Philosophical Society.

During his lifetime Lilienthal received honorary degrees from Boston University, DePauw University, Lehigh University, and Michigan State College.

== Notes ==
Political offices
Preceded by Harcourt Morgan	Chair of the Tennessee Valley Authority; 1941–1946	Succeeded by Gordon Clapp
New office	Chair of the Atomic Energy Commission; 1946–1950	Succeeded by Gordon Dean
Awards and achievements
Preceded by Hedda Hopper	Cover of Time; 4 August 1947	Succeeded by Cyril G. Illingworth
Preceded by George H. Shull; 1948	Recipient of the Public Welfare Medal; 1951	Succeeded by James R. Killian Jr. 1956
