= Contemporary history =

Era from 1945–present

Contemporary period
- c. 1945 – present
Late modern period
- Photo of Buzz Aldrin on the moon, taken by Neil Armstrong (1969)
- Location: Worldwide
- Key events: Cold War; Decolonization; Formation of the United Nations; Third Industrial Revolution; Post–Cold War era War on terror Covid-19 pandemic

Contemporary history, in English-language historiography, is a subset of modern history that describes the historical period from about 1945 to the present. In the social sciences, contemporary history is also continuous with, and related to, the rise of postmodernity.

Contemporary history is politically dominated by the Cold War (1947–1991) between the Western Bloc, led by the United States, and the Eastern Bloc, led by the Soviet Union. The confrontation spurred fears of a nuclear war. An all-out "hot" war was avoided, but both sides intervened in the internal politics of smaller nations in their bid for global influence and via proxy wars. The Cold War ultimately ended with the Revolutions of 1989 and the dissolution of the Soviet Union in 1991. The latter stages and aftermath of the Cold War enabled the democratization of much of Europe, Africa, and Latin America. Decolonization was another important trend in Southeast Asia, the Middle East, and Africa as new states gained independence from European colonial empires during the period from 1945–1975. The Middle East also saw a conflict involving the new state of Israel, the rise of petroleum politics, the continuing prominence but later decline of Arab nationalism, and the growth of Islamism. The first supranational organizations of government, such as the United Nations and European Union, emerged during the period after 1945.

Countercultures rose and the sexual revolution transformed social relations in western countries between the 1960s and 1980s, as seen in the protests of 1968. Living standards rose sharply across the developed world because of the post-war economic boom. Japan and West Germany both emerged as exceptionally strong economies. The culture of the United States spread widely, with American television and movies spreading across the world. Some Western countries began a slow process of deindustrializing in the 1970s; globalization led to the emergence of new financial and industrial centers in Asia. The Japanese economic miracle was later followed by the Four Asian Tigers of Hong Kong, Singapore, South Korea and Taiwan. China launched major economic reforms termed the reform and opening up from 1978 onward, becoming a major exporter of consumer goods around the world.

Science made new advances after 1945, which included spaceflight, nuclear technology, lasers, semiconductors, molecular biology, genetics, particle physics, and the Standard Model of quantum field theory. The first commercial computers were created, followed by the Internet, beginning the Information Age.

== Political history ==
=== 1945–1991 ===
The division of Europe during the Cold War

In 1945 the Allies of World War II had defeated all significant opposition to them. They established the United Nations to govern international relations and disputes. A looming question was how to handle the defeated Axis nations and the shattered nations that the Axis had conquered. Following the Yalta Conference, territory was divided into zones for which Allied country would have responsibility and manage rebuilding. While these zones were theoretically temporary (such as the eventual fate of occupied Austria, which was released to independence as a neutral country), growing tensions between the Western Bloc, led by the United States, with the Eastern Bloc, led by the Soviet Union, meant that many calcified into place. Countries in Soviet zones of Eastern Europe had communist regimes installed as satellite states. The Berlin Blockade of 1948 led to a Western Airlift to preserve West Berlin and signified a cooling of East-West relations. Germany split into two countries in 1949, liberal-democratic West Germany and communist East Germany. The conflict as a whole would become known as the Cold War. The Western Bloc formed NATO in 1949 while the Eastern Bloc formed the Warsaw Pact in 1955. Direct combat between the new Great Powers was generally avoided, although proxy wars fought in other countries by factions equipped by one side against the other side's faction occurred. An arms race to develop and build nuclear weapons happened as policymakers wanted to ensure their side had more if it came to a war.

In East Asia Chiang Kai-shek's Republic of China was overthrown in the Chinese Communist Revolution from 1945–1949. His government retreated to Taiwan, but both the nationalist KMT government and the new communist mainland government under Mao Zedong continued to claim authority over all of China. Korea was divided similarly to Germany, with the Soviet Union occupying the North and the United States occupying the South (future North Korea and South Korea). Unlike Germany, the conflict there turned hot, as the Korean War erupted from 1950–1953. Korea was not reunified under either government, however, due to strong support from both the US and China for their favored side; it became a frozen conflict instead. Japan was given a new constitution foreswearing aggressive war in 1947, and the American occupation ended in 1952, although a treaty of mutual aid with the US was soon signed. The US also granted the Philippines their independence in 1946 while keeping close relations.

The Middle East became a hotbed of instability. The new Jewish state of Israel declared its independence, recognized by both the United States and the Soviet Union, after which followed the 1948 Arab–Israeli War. Egypt's weak and ineffective king Farouk was overthrown in the 1952 Egyptian revolution, and replaced by General Nasser; the 1953 Iran coup saw the American-friendly shah Mohammad Reza Pahlavi remove the democratic constraints on his government and take power directly; and Iraq's Western-friendly monarchy was overthrown in 1958. Nasser's Egypt would go on to face the Suez Crisis in 1956, briefly unify with Syria as the United Arab Republic (UAR) from 1958 to 1961, and expensively intervene in the North Yemen civil war from 1962 to 1970.

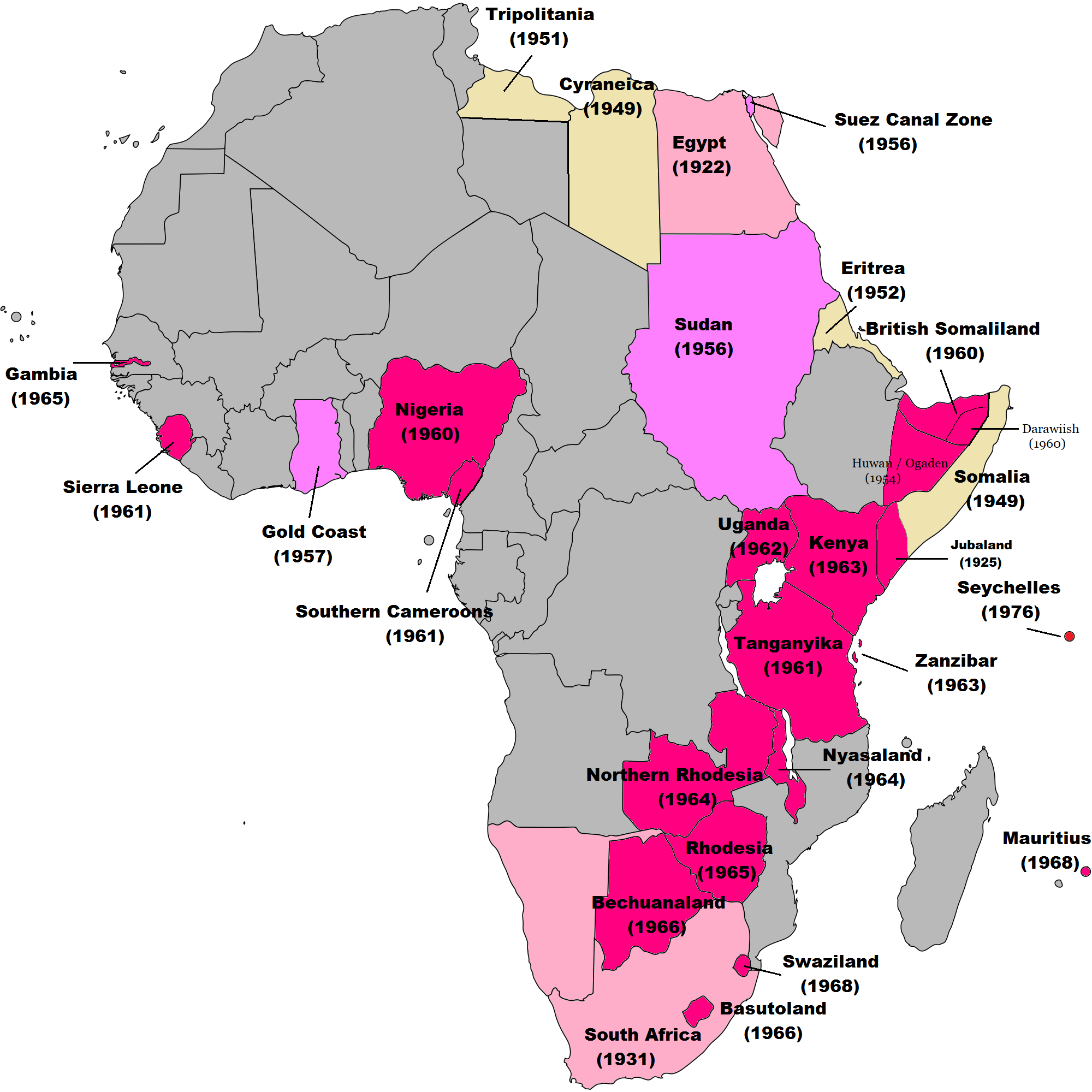
Decolonization of the British Empire in Africa

Decolonization was the most important development across Southeast Asia and Africa from 1946–1975, as the old British, French, Dutch, and Portuguese colonial empires were dismantled. Many new states were given their independence, but soon found themselves having to choose between allying with the Western Bloc, Eastern Bloc, or attempting to stay neutral as a member of the Non-Aligned Movement. British India was granted independence in 1947 without an outright war of independence being required. It was partitioned into Hindu-majority India and Muslim-majority Pakistan (West Pakistan and East Pakistan, future Pakistan and Bangladesh); Indo-Pakistani wars were fought in 1947, 1965, and 1971. Sukarno took control of an independent Indonesia in 1950, as attempts to reinstate Dutch rule in 1945–1949 had largely failed, and took an independent-to-Eastern leaning stance. He would later be overthrown by Suharto in 1968, who took a pro-Western stance. The Federation of Malaya was granted independence in 1957, with the concurrent fighting of the Malayan Emergency against communist forces from 1948–1960. The French unsuccessfully fought the First Indochina War in an attempt to hold on to French Indochina; at the 1954 Geneva Conference, the new states of Cambodia, Laos, the Democratic Republic of Vietnam, and the eventual Republic of Vietnam were created. The division of Indochina eventually led to the Vietnam War in the 1960s and 70s (as well as the Laotian Civil War and Cambodian Civil War), which ended in communist North Vietnam unifying the country in 1975.

In Africa, France fought the grinding Algerian War from 1954–1962 that saw the end of French Algeria and the rise of a new independent Algeria. The British and French both slowly released their vast holdings, leading to the creation of states such as First Nigerian Republic in 1963. Portugal, on the other hand, fiercely held onto their Empire, leading to the Portuguese Colonial War from 1961–1974 in Angola, Guinea-Bissau, and Mozambique until the Estado Novo government fell. Meanwhile, apartheid-era South Africa remained fiercely anti-communist, but withdrew from the British Commonwealth in 1961, and supported various pro-colonial factions across Africa that had lost support from their "home" governments in Europe. Many of the newly independent African governments struggled with the balance between being too weak and overthrown by ambitious coup-plotters, and too strong and becoming dictatorships.

Latin America saw gradual economic growth but also instability in many countries, as the threat of coups and military regimes (juntas) were a major threat. The most famous was the Cuban Revolution that overthrew Fulgencio Batista's American-friendly government for Fidel Castro's Soviet-aligned government. This led to the Cuban Missile Crisis in 1963, generally considered one of the incidents most dangerously close to turning the Cold War into a direct military conflict. The 1968 Peruvian coup d'état and also installed a Soviet-friendly government. Despite this, the region ultimately leaned toward the US in this period, with the CIA supporting American-friendly factions in the 1954 Guatemalan coup d'état, the 1964 Brazilian coup d'état, the 1973 Chilean coup d'état, and others. Nicaragua suffered the most, with the Nicaraguan Revolution seeing major military aid from both great powers to their favored factions that extended a civil war in the country for decades. Mexico escaped this unrest, although functioned largely as a one-party state dominated by the PRI. Argentina had a succession of idiosyncratic governments that courted both the US and USSR, but generally mismanaged the economy.

The Middle East saw events that presaged later conflicts in the 70s and 80s. A few years after the end of the UAR's union between Egypt and Syria, Syria's government was overthrown in the 1966 Syrian coup d'état and replaced with the Neo-Baathist Party, eventually leading to the leadership of the Al-Assad family. Israel and its neighbors fought the Six-Day War in 1967 and the Yom Kippur War of 1973. Under Anwar Sadat and later Hosni Mubarak, Egypt switched from Nasserism to favoring the Western Bloc, and signed a peace treaty with Israel. Lebanon, once among the most prosperous countries in the region and a cultural center, collapsed into the decade-long Lebanese Civil War from 1975–1990. Iran's unpopular pro-American government was overthrown in the 1979 Iranian Revolution and was replaced by a new Islamic Republic headed by Ruhollah Khomeini. Iran and Baathist Iraq under Saddam Hussein then fought each other in the Iran–Iraq War from 1980–1988, which ended inconclusively.

In East Asia, China underwent the Cultural Revolution from 1966 to 1976, a major internal struggle that saw an intense program of Maoism and persecution of perceived internal enemies. China's relations with the Soviets deteriorated in the 1960s and 70s, resulting in the Sino-Soviet split, although the two were able to cooperate on some matters. "Ping-pong diplomacy" led to a rapprochement between the US and China and American recognition of the Chinese communist government in the 1970s. China's pro-democracy movement was suppressed after the 1989 Tiananmen Square protests, and China's government survived the tensions that would roil the Soviet-aligned bloc during the 1980s. South Korea (in the June Democratic Struggle) and Taiwan (with the lifting of martial law) would take major steps toward liberalization in 1987–1988, shifting from Western-aligned one-party states to more fully participatory democracies.

The 1980s saw a general retreat for the communist bloc. The Soviet–Afghan War (1979–1989) is often called the "Soviet Union's Vietnam War" in comparison to the American defeat, being an expensive and ultimately unsuccessful war and occupation. More importantly, the intervening decades had seen that Eastern Europe was unable to compete economically with Western Europe, which undermined the promise of communist abundance compared to capitalist poverty. The Western capitalist economies had proven wealthier and stronger, which made matching the Soviet defense budget to the American one strain limited resources. The Pan-European Picnic in 1989 then set in motion a peaceful chain reaction with the subsequent fall of the Berlin Wall. The Revolutions of 1989 saw many countries of Eastern Europe throw off their communist governments, and the USSR declined to invade to re-establish them. East and West Germany were reunified. Client state status for many states ended, as there was no conflict left to fund. The Malta Summit on 3 December 1989, the failure of the August Coup by Soviet hardliners, and the formal dissolution of the Soviet Union on 26 December 1991 sealed the end of the Cold War.

=== 1991–2001 ===
The end of the Cold War left the United States the world's sole superpower. Communism seemed discredited; while China remained an officially communist state, Deng Xiaoping's reform and opening up and socialism with Chinese characteristics allowed for the growth of a capitalist private sector in China. In Russia, President Boris Yeltsin pursued a policy of privatization, spinning off former government agencies into private corporations, attempting to handle budget problems inherited from the USSR. The end of Soviet foreign aid caused a variety of changes in countries previously part of the Eastern Bloc; many officially became democratic republics, though some were more accurately described as authoritarian or oligarchic republics and one-party states. Many Western commentators treated the development optimistically; it was thought the world was steadily progressing toward free, liberal democracies. South Africa, no longer able to attract Western support by claiming to be anti-communist, ended apartheid in the early 1990s, and many Eastern European countries switched to stable democracies. While some Americans had anticipated a "peace dividend" from budget cuts to the Defense Department, these cuts were not as large as some had hoped. The European Economic Community evolved into the European Union with the signing of the Maastricht Treaty in 1993, which integrated Europe across borders to a new degree. International coalitions continued to have a role; the Gulf War saw a large international coalition undo Baathist Iraq's annexation of Kuwait, but other "police" style actions were less successful. Somalia and Afghanistan descended into long, bloody civil wars for almost the entirety of the decade (Somali Civil War, Afghan Civil War (1992–1996), Afghan Civil War (1996–2001)). Russia fought a brutal war in Chechnya that failed to suppress the insurgency there from 1994–1996; war would resume during the Second Chechen War in 1999–2000 that saw a resumption of Russian control after Russia successfully convinced enough rebels to join their cause with promises of autonomy. The breakup of Yugoslavia also led to a series of Yugoslav Wars; NATO eventually intervened in the Kosovo War. In the Middle East, the Israeli–Palestinian peace process offered the prospect of a long-term peace deal to many; the Oslo Accords signed in 1993 seemed to offer a "roadmap" to resolving the conflict. Despite these high hopes, they would be largely dashed in 2000–2001 after a breakdown of negotiations and the Second Intifada.

=== 2001–present ===
In 2001 the September 11 attacks—the deadliest terrorist attacks in human history—were carried out by al-Qaeda against the United States. In response, the United States declared the war on terror, a global conflict against Islamist terrorism. US-led coalitions launched a war in Afghanistan (2001–2021) against the Taliban-ruled Islamic Emirate and the Iraq War (2003–2011) that deposed Iraqi leader Saddam Hussein. The US killed al-Qaeda leader Osama bin Laden in 2011 and withdrew from Afghanistan in 2021, after which the Taliban retook control of the country. The US also led interventions against militant groups across Africa and the Middle East, including the war against the Islamic State. After the 11 September attacks, many countries expanded the powers of law enforcement to combat terrorism and several other terrorist attacks took place across the world.

China has sought to challenge the United States's global hegemony. Under Barack Obama, the US pivoted its foreign policy focus to East Asia; China–US relations deteriorated further under Xi Jinping in China and Donald Trump in the US. The two countries have engaged in a trade war and fought for influence in the developing world. In later years, China escalated disputes in the South China Sea and over Taiwan and has led BRICS as forum for emerging powers, while the US formed the Quad grouping with Australia, India, and Japan. Disputes between India and China led to skirmishes between the two countries (2020–2021), and after North Korea obtained nuclear weapons in 2006, the threat of their use caused the North Korean crisis (2017–2018). Elsewhere in Asia, Nepal abolished its monarchy in 2008 after the end of the Nepalese Civil War; a 2015 nationwide ceasefire after a series of reforms (2011–2015) ended the Myanmar conflict until a coup d'état began a new civil war in 2021; and a 2024 a pro-democracy uprising in Bangladesh overthrew Sheikh Hasina. In 2025, Nepal's former government was overthrown forming a new government.

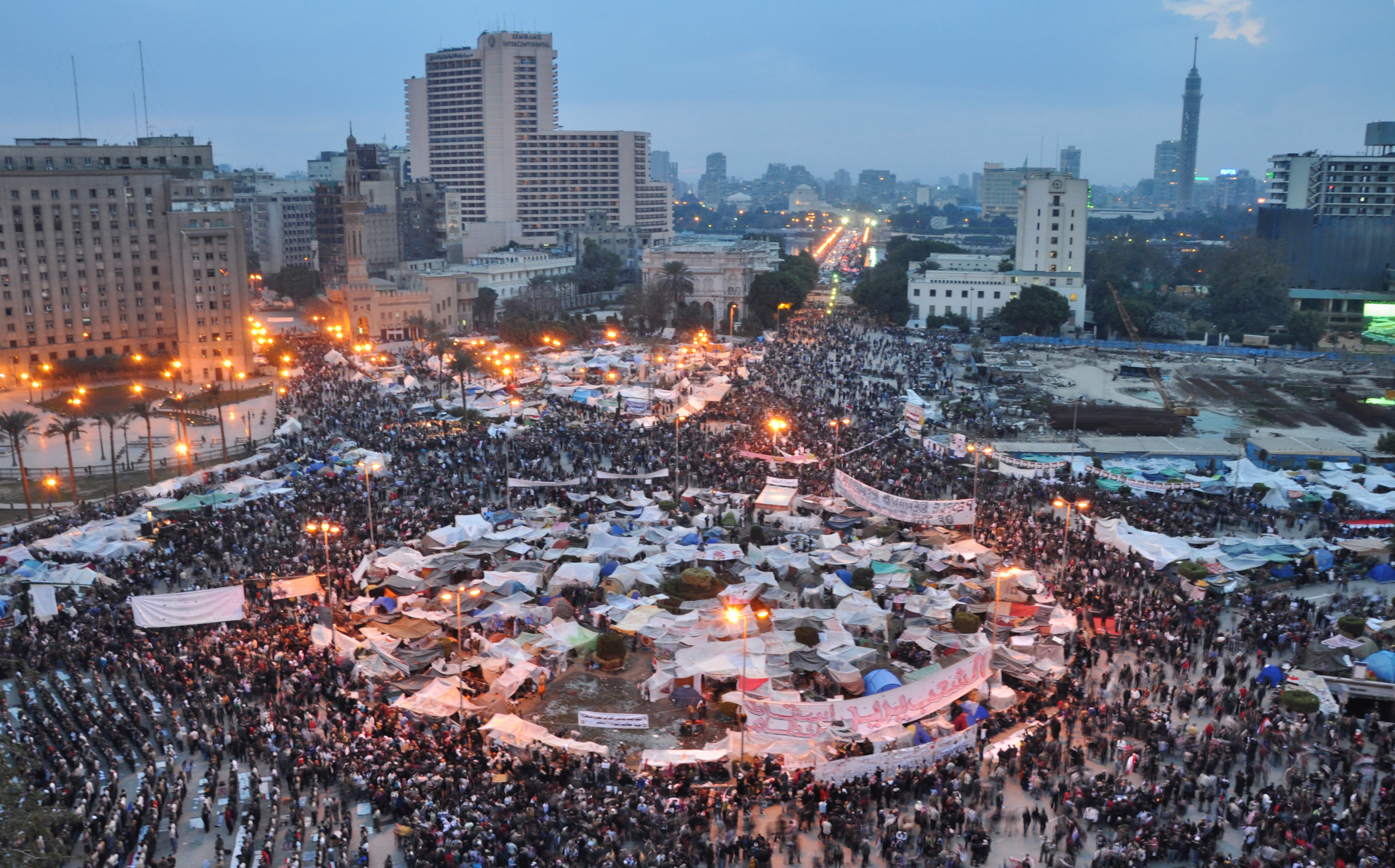
Tahrir Square in Cairo, Egypt, during the Egyptian revolution, 2011

In the Arab world, a series of anti-government protests, uprisings, and armed resistances known as the Arab Spring (2010–2012) began after a revolution in Tunisia that ended the country's dictatorship. The Egyptian revolution in 2011 led to a political crisis and a second change of power in a 2013 coup d'état; in Libya and Yemen, successful revolutions gave way to protracted political crises and civil wars. Protests against Syrian leader Bashar al-Assad led to a multi-sided civil war (2011–2024) that ultimately ended after the fall of the Assad regime in 2024 amid a regional crisis triggered by the October 7 attacks in 2023 and subsequent Gaza war. The Gaza war also led to an Israeli invasion of Lebanon that largely destroyed Hezbollah and a significant escalation of the Iran–Israel proxy conflict. Fears of Iran's nuclear program led to a 2015 international deal to limit it and growing Arab–Israeli normalization which included the 2020 signing of the Abraham Accords. In 2026, a US–Israeli war on Iran began intended to remove the Iranian regime through air strikes, which killed Ali Khamenei and resulted in retaliatory Iranian strikes against several Middle Eastern nations.

Conflicts in the former Soviet Union continued; Russia invaded Georgia in 2008 and seized Crimea from Ukraine in 2014 after a pro-Western revolution in Ukraine, beginning a conflict that led to a full-scale Russian invasion of the country in 2022. The Nagorno-Karabakh conflict ended after Azerbaijan's victories in a war with Armenia (2020) and in a later offensive (2023) incorporated Artsakh into the country. Serbia and Montenegro dissolved in 2006 and Kosovo declared independence from Serbia two years later to partial recognition. NATO and the European Union continued to expand eastward; by 2024, 11 more countries had joined NATO and 13 had joined the EU, while the United Kingdom left the EU in 2020 after years of negotiations.

In Africa, the end of the Second Sudanese Civil War allowed South Sudan to declare independence in 2011, and a subsequent civil war (2013–2020) ended in a ceasefire. Beginning in the 2020s, a series of coups d'état primarily in the Sahel installed military juntas in Mali, in Guinea, in Burkina Faso, in Niger, and in Gabon amid a regional Islamist insurgency and initiated a standoff (2023–2024) between ECOWAS and juntas in Niger, Mali, and Burkina Faso, which formed the Alliance of Sahel States in 2023 and established a confederation in 2024. A 2021 coup in Sudan ended the country's transition to democracy and resulting political crises began a civil war in 2023. The East African Community has developed and expanded across the continent while a military conflict between Rwanda and the Democratic Republic of the Congo has persisted since 2022.

== Economic history ==
The end of World War II in 1945 saw an increase in international trade and an interconnected system of treaties and agreements to ease its flow. In particular, the United States and the United States dollar took a pivotal role in the world economy, displacing the UK. The era is sometimes called "Pax Americana" for the relative liberal peace in the Western world, resulting from the preponderance of power enjoyed by the US, as a comparison to the Pax Romana established at the height of the Roman Empire. New York's financial sector ("Wall Street") was the center of the financial world from 1945–1970 in a dominant way unlikely to be seen again. Unlike the aftermath of World War I, the US strongly aided in the rebuilding of Europe, including aid to the defeated Axis nations, rather than punishment. The Marshall Plan sent billions of dollars of aid to Western Europe to ensure its stability and ward off a potential economic downturn. The 1944 Bretton Woods Conference established the Bretton Woods system, a set of practices that governed world trade and currencies from 1945–1971, as well as the World Bank and the International Monetary Fund (IMF). Western Europe also established the European Economic Community in 1957 to ease customs and aid international trade. In general, vast quality of life improvements affected most every corner of the globe during this period, in both the Western and Eastern spheres. France called them Les Trente Glorieuses ("The Glorious Thirty [Years]"). Despite being largely destroyed in the war, West Germany soon bounced back to being an economic powerhouse by the 1950s with the wirtschaftswunder. Surprisingly, Japan followed Germany, achieving incredible economic growth and becoming the second largest economy in the world in 1968, a phenomenon called the Japanese economic miracle. Many explanations are proffered for the enviable results of these years: relative peace (at least outside the "Third World"); a reduction in average family size; technological improvements; and others. The Eastern Bloc, meanwhile, established Comecon as their equivalent to the Marshall Plan and to establish internal trading rules between communist states.

The 1970s saw economic headwinds. Notably, the price of oil started to go up in the 1970s, as the easiest and most accessible wells had already been pumped dry in the preceding century, and oil is a non-renewable resource. Attention was drawn to the abundant oil in the Middle East, where countries in OPEC controlled substantial untapped oil reserves. Political tensions over the Yom Kippur War and the Iranian Revolution led to the 1973 oil crisis and 1979 oil crisis. The Soviet Union called it the "Era of Stagnation". The 1970s and 80s also saw the rise of the Four Asian Tigers, as South Korea, Taiwan, Singapore, and Hong Kong emulated the Japanese route to prosperity with varying degree of success. In China, the leftist Gang of Four were overthrown in 1976, and Deng Xiaoping pursued a policy of tentatively opening the Chinese economy to capitalist innovations throughout the 1980s, which would be continued by his successors in the 1990s. China's economy, tiny in 1976, would see tremendous growth, and eventually take the spot as second largest economy from Japan in 2010. Among Western economies, the collapse of the Bretton Woods system was replaced by a more flexible era of floating exchange rates. The Group of Seven (G7) first met in 1975 and become one of the main international forums that regulated international trade among developed country. The Soviet Union implemented a policy of perestroika in the 1980s which allowed tentative market reforms. The fall of the USSR saw differing approaches in the 1990s in the East: some newly independent states went in a capitalist direction such as Estonia, some maintained a strong governmental presence in their economy, and some opted for a mix. The privatization of government firms and resources drew accusations of crony capitalism in many states, however, including the Russian Federation, the largest and most important state of the USSR; the beneficiaries of the turbulent period were often called the "Russian oligarchs".

In the beginning of the 2000s, there was a global rise in prices in commodities and housing, marking an end to the 2000s commodities boom. The US mortgage-backed securities, which had risks that were hard to assess, were marketed around the world and a broad based credit boom fed a global speculative bubble in real estate and equities. The financial situation was also affected by a sharp increase in oil and food prices. The collapse of the American housing bubble caused the values of securities tied to real estate pricing to plummet thereafter, damaging financial institutions. The Great Recession, a severe economic recession which began in the United States in 2007, was sparked by the outbreak of the 2008 financial crisis. The 2008 financial crisis was linked to earlier lending practices by financial institutions and the trend of securitization of American real estate mortgages.

The Great Recession spread to much of the developed country, and has caused a pronounced deceleration of economic activity. The global recession occurred in an economic environment characterized by various imbalances. This global recession has resulted in a sharp drop in international trade, rising unemployment and slumping commodity prices. The recession renewed interest in Keynesian economic ideas on how to combat recessionary conditions. However, various industrial countries continued to undertake austerity policies to cut deficits, reduced spending, as opposed to following Keynesian theories.

Countries by real GDP growth rate in 2014 (Countries in brown were in recession.)

From late 2009 European debt crisis, fears of a sovereign debt crisis developed among investors concerning rising government debt levels across the globe together with a wave of downgrading of government debt of certain European states. Concerns intensified early 2010 and thereafter making it difficult or impossible for sovereigns to re-finance their debts. On 9 May 2010, Europe's Finance Ministers approved a rescue package worth €750 billion aimed at ensuring financial stability across Europe. The European Financial Stability Facility (EFSF) was a special purpose vehicle financed by members of the eurozone to combat the European sovereign debt crisis. In October 2011 eurozone leaders agreed on another package of measures designed to prevent the collapse of member economies. The three most affected countries, Greece, Ireland and Portugal, collectively account for six percent of eurozone's gross domestic product (GDP). In 2012, eurozone finance ministers reached an agreement on a second €130-billion Greek bailout. In 2013, the European Union agreed to a €10 billion economic bailout for Cyprus due to the 2012–2013 Cypriot financial crisis. The 2020 coronavirus pandemic caused economic disruption, with wide-ranging economic impacts of COVID-19 such as supply chain changes and an increase in working-from-home, along with the COVID-19 recession.

== Social history ==
Social changes since 1945 have been vast and disparate, affecting countries and subgroups within those countries in ways specific to each population, meaning there is not one single global story of social change. Despite this, one of the major trends has been an increasing interchange between cultures and a wider spread of the most successful works, enabled by new technology and globalization. In earlier periods, a successful musician or theater troupe might be confined to playing in a single city at a time, limiting their reach. The spread of better recording technology, such as the magnetophon, meant that a musical act could have their song be played over the radio everywhere without loss of sound quality, creating international superstars such as Elvis Presley and The Beatles. The spread of home television sets allowed people across the globe to easily watch the same show, rather than requiring viewers to attend a local theater. Hollywood in California produced films that dominated cinema; while intended for the lucrative American market, these films spread across the globe, backed by their large budgets and the cinematic expertise gathered there. The rise of the Internet in the 1990s allowed both for an ever further spread of the most popular and dominant works, but the comparatively cheap cost of publishing there, whether as a personal website, blog, or YouTube video, also allowed specific niche subcultures to connect and thrive in a way that was less true in the 20th century. For example, diaspora groups of immigrants can more easily stay in contact with their family and friends in their origin region, compared to earlier eras where travel and communication was far more expensive, making a narrative of strictly increasing global homogenization incomplete. International telephone networks, and later Internet telephony, allowed cheaper and easier long-distance communication than previous eras.

Language usage in the contemporary era has seen a rise in English as a lingua franca, where people across the world learn the English language as a second language. This has been both to facilitate international communication, especially in places tied to international trade or tourism, as well as to better consume widespread English-language media. This is tied to increased Americanization, as American culture has grown increasingly influential and widespread. To a lesser extent, during the Cold War, something similar happened with the Russian language in the Eastern Bloc and among communist-aligned factions; however, this status was mostly reversed after the collapse of the Soviet Union. The French and German languages saw their prestige as global languages decline after World War II.

Religious trends have been disparate and not consistent across countries, often with sharply varying results even between similar and nearby groups. In industrialized and economically prosperous regions, there has been a loose trend toward secularization that deprioritized the role of religion, even among people who still identified as adherents. The decline of Christianity in the Western world has been perhaps the most notable of these trends, although many non-Western cultures have been affected as well, such as the rise of irreligion in China (buttressed by antireligious campaigns). As an example of how localized this process can be, during the Cold War both the Polish People's Republic and the Czechoslovak Socialist Republic endorsed state atheism. However, after the fall of the Iron Curtain in 1989–1990, the people of these bordering states had radically different cultural attitudes toward religion; Poland was one of the more religious states in Europe, with 96% of its population espousing a belief in Catholic Christianity in 2011, while the Czech Republic was one of the most stridently irreligious, with only 15% of its population espousing any religious beliefs at all by 2011. In the Islamic world, a notable trend has been the spread of international schools of thought into regions where belief was previously localized, such as the International propagation of Salafism and Wahhabism funded by the government of Saudi Arabia. While regional Islamic groups remain strong, they are more contested than in the past.

Another social trend has been the rise of urbanization as a larger proportion of the world's population has moved to live in cities and urban areas, and fewer people live in rural areas. In the United States, as the overall population more than doubled from 1930 to 1990, around a third of its counties saw their population decline by around 27%, suggesting that as rural counties empty, the urban counties are where the vast majority of inhabitants are moving to. In Eastern Africa, the urban population soared from 11 million in 1920 to 77 million in 2010. Many rural Chinese people moved to large coastal cities such as Shenzhen to work in the 1990s and 2000s, leading to a sharp increase of Urbanization in China. Rural parts of Japan have seen stark population declines, especially among the young, with only the Greater Tokyo area continuing to grow. How to deal with this change is a major issue, as many cities and their transportation networks were not designed to serve the larger populations that now occupy them.

A major trend in many industrialized nations was the sexual revolution, an adoption of publicly more tolerant attitudes toward sex and pre-marital sex. "The pill" was first approved for use in 1960 in the United States, and spread rapidly around the world. The pill made birth control easier and more reliable than earlier methods. This made sex for pleasure less likely to result in unintended children. It also allowed for easier family planning, where couples could choose more specifically when to have kids compared to earlier eras. Some analysts credit this as one reason behind a decline in birth rates in the industrialized world, which had multiple second-order effects. Many regions have also made divorce much easier to officially procure. However, the decline in birth rate is not a universal trend; many nations continue to have high birth rates, and the world's overall population is still growing as of 2022. By 2026, birth rate decline spread to Secular Muslim Nations, almost all of Latin America and many lower middle income countries like The Philippines and Thailand. The extremely rapid decline of the 2020s in so many non-developed countries is inconsistent with Economic growth. For example, In 2024, Mexico recorded a lower fertility rate than Canada

One of the yet evolving and unknown impacts in the contemporary era has been the social effects of cheap and common Internet access. As users gradually switched from personal web pages to blogs to social media, many surprising effects have resulted with both positive and negative assessments. Optimistic assessments often praise the decentralized nature that allows anyone to theoretically gain a platform without the need to convince a publisher or media company to back them, as well as the ease in enabling like-minded people to collaborate at long-distance, even if the digital utopianism of the 1990s is less common. Pessimistic assessments worry about the effects on children such as enabling cyberbullying; filter bubbles where Internet users are not challenged by outsider views; "cancel culture" where people are pilloried online but sometimes disproportionately; and slacktivism as an appealing but ineffective replacement for older forms of community work. In the mid 2020s, short form content arguably strengthened negative views towards social media as it arguably ether removed many of the initially positive effects or accelerated and worsened the consequences of the negative effects

== Contemporary science and technology ==
=== Energy ===
The growing world population and rising standards of living has caused a vast increase in demand for energy development, both to power vehicles such as personal cars as well as on public electrical grids. In particular, petroleum oil has been in ravenous demand across the world. Many of the cheapest and easiest sources of oil to access were largely drained in the 19th and early 20th centuries, leading to a hunt for new sources of oil. The value of oil has spilled over into politics as well, as "petrostates" with access to oil found a source of vast revenue that did not require traditional government revenue-raising measures, such as tariffs or income taxation. The rising cost of oil led to the 1970s energy crisis and various adaptations in energy conservation to better conserve oil, such as more efficient engines and better insulation. It has also led to concerns of "peak oil," that the rising extraction costs of oil will eventually lead to massive shortages and a large disincentive to burn oil except when absolutely necessary (such as in the case of aviation fuel), although oil continues to be one of the most popular sources of energy.

Other fossil fuels have continued a prominent role in the world's energy production. Coal energy, usually credited as helping kickstart the Industrial Revolution, has declined somewhat in prominence, but it started from a commanding large slice of the sources of energy. Even if diminished, coal is still a popular and common style of power plant; it made up a huge proportion of South Africa and India's power grid from 1945 to the present, for example. That said, increasing price, as well as concerns both over the air pollution generated when it is burnt and the landscape destruction when it is mined (such as mountaintop removal mining), have caused setbacks for the coal industry. Natural gas has grown in its proportion of the market, especially as Liquefied natural gas (LNG) has enabled it to be transported over longer distances than was previously feasible.

An entirely new form of energy creation dawned in the 1950s and 1960s: nuclear power for peaceful purposes and the construction of nuclear power plants. Hopes that atomic energy would be "too cheap to meter" in the 1950s proved overly optimistic, however. Atomic energy grew to be a large part of several nations energy generation strategies, especially nuclear power in France. Nuclear power continues to be controversial. Concerns include its association with nuclear weapons, financial cost, disposal of radioactive nuclear waste, and fears of safety from reactor meltdowns, especially after the 1986 Chernobyl disaster. An anti-nuclear movement arose that was skeptical of atomic energy and has discouraged many projects. Nuclear proponents counter that nuclear energy produces no air pollution compared to traditional fossil fuel plants, and can provide a steady supply of energy regardless of external conditions unlike solar and wind energy. With the supply of Russian natural gas disrupted in 2022, France is looking to reactivate some of its older decommissioned nuclear plants, for example.

Various forms of renewable energy have grown in prominence in the contemporary era. Wind energy, while used on a small scale for centuries, has seen growth with large distributed groups of windmills used to produce energy for the grid. Solar power has also grown in prominence, with around 4% of the world's overall energy production in 2021 (compared to a much smaller slice before). While these energy sources are considered to be much less environmentally impactful than fossil fuels, concerns have been raised over the various rare earth metals used in the production of batteries and solar, which can require destructive mining techniques to gather.

=== Computing and the Internet ===
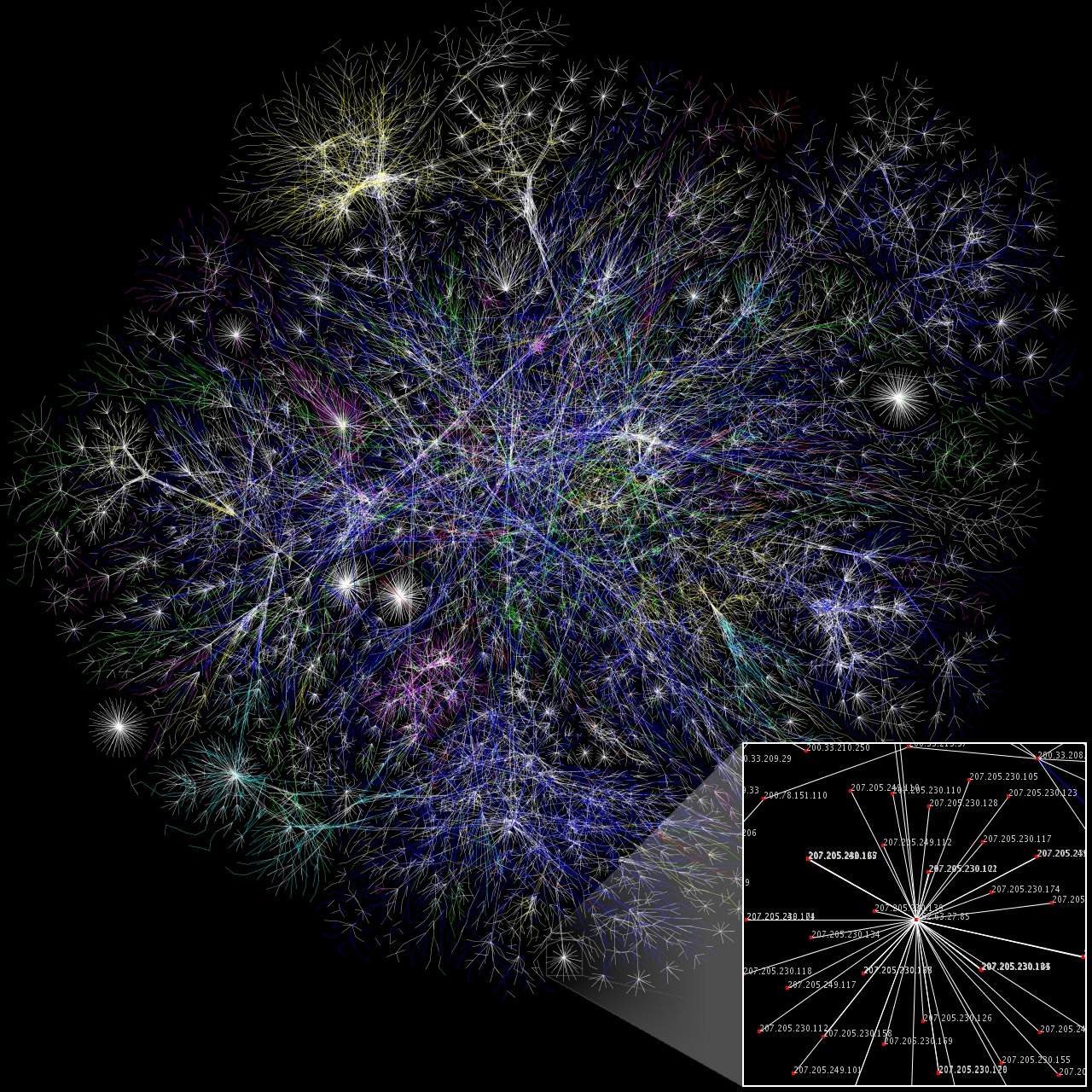
A visualization of the various routes through a portion of the Internet. Partial map of the Internet based in 2005

The Information Age or Information Era, also commonly known as the Age of the Computer, is an idea that the current age will be characterized by the ability of individuals to transfer information freely, and to have instant access to knowledge that would have been difficult or impossible to find previously. The idea is heavily linked to the concept of a digital age or digital revolution, and carries the ramifications of a shift from traditional industry that the Industrial Revolution brought through industrialization, to an economy based around the manipulation of information. The period is generally said to have begun in the latter half of the 20th century, though the particular date varies. The term began its use around the late 1980s and early 1990s, and has been used up to the present with the availability of the Internet.

During the late 1990s, both Internet directories and search engines were popular—Yahoo! and Altavista (both founded 1995) were the respective industry leaders. By late 2001, the directory model had begun to give way to search engines, tracking the rise of Google (founded 1998), which had developed new approaches to relevancy ranking. Directory features, while still commonly available, became after-thoughts to search engines. Database size, which had been a significant marketing feature through the early 2000s (decade), was similarly displaced by emphasis on relevancy ranking, the methods by which search engines attempt to sort the best results first.

"Web 2.0" is characterized as facilitating communication, information sharing, interoperability, User-centered design and collaboration on the World Wide Web. It has led to the development and evolution of web-based communities, hosted services, and web applications. Examples include social-networking sites, video-sharing sites, wikis, blogs, mashups and folksonomies. Social networking emerged in the early 21st century as a popular social communication, largely replacing much of the function of email, message boards and instant messaging services. Twitter, Facebook, and YouTube are all major examples of social websites that gained widespread popularity. The information distribution continued into the early 21st century with mobile interaction and Internet access growing massively in the early 21st century. By the 2010s, a majority of people in the developed world had Internet access and a majority of people worldwide had a mobile phone. Marking the rise of mobile computing, worldwide sales of personal computers fall 14% during the first quarter of 2013. The Semantic Web (dubbed, "Web 3.0") begins the inclusion of semantic content in web pages, converting the current web dominated by unstructured and semi-structured documents into a "web of data".

With the rise of information technology, computer security, and information security in general, is a concern for computers and networks. Concerns include information and services which are protected from unintended or unauthorized access, change or destruction. This has also raised questions of Internet privacy and personal privacy globally.

=== Space exploration ===
The space race was one of the rivalries of the Cold War, with both the United States space program (NASA) and the Soviet space program launching satellites, probes, and planning missions. While the Soviets put the first human into space with Yuri Gagarin, the Americans soon caught up, and the US was the first to launch a successful Moon landing mission with Apollo 11 in 1969, followed by five more landings in the next few years.

In the 1970s and 80s the US took a new approach with the Space Shuttle program, hoping to reduce the cost of launches by creating a re-usable Space Shuttle. The first fully functional Space Shuttle orbiter was Columbia (designated OV-102), launched into low Earth orbit in April 1981. In 1996, Shuttle mission STS-75 conducted research in space with the electrodynamic tether generator and other tether configurations. The program suffered from two incidents that destroyed a shuttle: the Challenger disaster and the Columbia disaster). The program ultimately had 135 missions. The retirement of NASA's Space Shuttle fleet took place from March to July 2011.

The end of the Cold War saw a new era of international cooperation with the International Space Station (ISS). Commercial spaceflight also became possible as governments loosened what had previously been their firm control over satellites, opening new possibilities, but also new risks such as light pollution from satellites. The Commercial Orbital Transportation Services (COTS) program began in 2006.

There are various spaceports, including spaceports of human spaceflight and other launch systems (space logistics). Private spaceflight is flight beyond the Kármán line that is conducted and paid for by an entity other than a government agency. Commercialization of space is the use of equipment sent into or through outer space to provide goods or services of commercial value, either by a corporation or state. Space trade plans and predictions began in the 1960s. Spacecraft propulsion is any method used to accelerate spacecraft and artificial satellites.

NASA announced in 2011 that its Mars Reconnaissance Orbiter captured photographic evidence of possible liquid water on Mars during warm seasons. On 6 August 2012, the Mars Science Laboratory Curiosity, the most elaborate Martian exploration vehicle to date, landed on Mars. After the WMAP observations of the cosmic microwave background, information was released in 2011 of the work done by the Planck Surveyor, estimating the age of the universe to 13.8 billion years old (100 million years older than previously thought). Another technological advancement came in 2012 with European physicists statistically demonstrating the existence of the Higgs boson.

== Challenges and problems ==
=== Climate change ===
Climate change and global warming reflects the notion of the modern climate. The changes of climate over the past century, have been attributed to various factors which have resulted in a global warming. This warming is the increase in the average temperature of the Earth's near-surface air and oceans since the mid-20th century and its projected continuation. Some effects on both the natural environment and human life are, at least in part, already being attributed to global warming. A 2001 report by the Intergovernmental Panel on Climate Change suggests that glacier retreat, ice shelf disruption such as that of the Larsen Ice Shelf, sea level rise, changes in rainfall patterns, and increased intensity and frequency of extreme weather events are attributable in part to global warming. Other expected effects include water scarcity in some regions and increased precipitation in others, changes in mountain snowpack, and adverse health effects from warmer temperatures.

It is usually impossible to connect specific weather events to human impact on the world. Instead, such impact is expected to cause changes in the overall distribution and intensity of weather events, such as changes to the frequency and intensity of heavy precipitation. Broader effects are expected to include glacial retreat, Arctic shrinkage, and worldwide sea level rise. Other effects may include changes in crop yields, addition of new trade routes, species extinctions, and changes in the range of disease vectors. Until 2009, the Arctic Northwest Passage pack ice prevented regular marine shipping throughout most of the year in this area, but climate change has reduced the pack ice, and this Arctic shrinkage made the waterways more navigable.

=== Health and pandemics ===
Several disease outbreaks, epidemics, and pandemics have occurred during contemporary history. Some of these include the 1957–1958 influenza pandemic, the Hong Kong flu of 1968–1969, the 1977–1979 Russian flu, the HIV/AIDS epidemic (1981–present), the SARS outbreak of 2002–2004, the swine flu pandemic of 2009–2010, and the COVID-19 pandemic (2019–2022).

==== COVID-19 pandemic ====
In 2020 an outbreak of the COVID-19 disease, first documented in late 2019 in Wuhan, China, spread to other countries becoming a global pandemic, which caused a major socio-economic disruption all over the world. Many countries ordered mandatory lockdowns on movement and closures of non-essential businesses. The threat of the disease caused the COVID-19 recession, although the distribution of vaccines has since eased the economic impact in many countries.

More generally, COVID-19 has been held up as an example of a global catastrophic risk unique to the modern era's ease of travel. New diseases can spread far faster and further in the contemporary era than any previous era of human history; pandemic prevention is one resulting field to ensure that if this happens with a sufficiently deadly virus, humanity can take measures to stop its spread.

== Charts ==
=== Contemporary world map ===
Political map of country and territory boundaries

== See also ==
General:

- Modern history, Timelines of modern history, Anthropocene

Generations:

- Generation, List of social generations, Baby boomers, Generation X, Millennials, Generation Z, Generation Alpha

Music and arts:

- Contemporary art, Contemporary dance, Contemporary literature, Contemporary music, Contemporary hit radio, Adult contemporary music, Contemporary Christian music, Contemporary R&B, Urban contemporary, Video games

Future:

- Future history, Futurology, Timeline of the near future, Third millennium, 21st century
