= Lewis Strauss =

American governmental official (1896–1974)

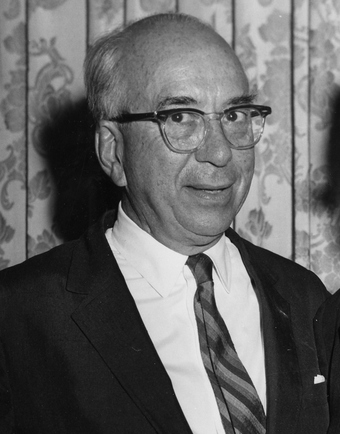
- Strauss in 1962

United States Secretary of Commerce
- Acting
- In office November 13, 1958 – June 30, 1959
- President: Dwight D. Eisenhower
- Preceded by: Sinclair Weeks
- Succeeded by: Frederick H. Mueller

Chair of the Atomic Energy Commission
- In office July 2, 1953 – June 30, 1958
- President: Dwight D. Eisenhower
- Preceded by: Gordon Dean
- Succeeded by: John A. McCone

Member of the Atomic Energy Commission
- In office November 12, 1946 – April 15, 1950
- President: Harry S. Truman
- Preceded by: Position established
- Succeeded by: T. Keith Glennan

Personal details
- Born: Lewis Lichtenstein Strauss; January 31, 1896 Charleston, West Virginia, U.S.
- Died: January 21, 1974 (aged 77) Brandy Station, Virginia, U.S.
- Resting place: Hebrew Cemetery
- Party: Republican
- Spouse: Alice Hanauer
- Children: 2
- Civilian awards: Medal of Freedom

Military service
- Allegiance: United States
- Branch/service: United States Navy
- Years of service: 1926–1945
- Rank: Rear Admiral
- Unit: Bureau of Ordnance
- Military awards: Distinguished Service Medal; Legion of Merit (4)

Lewis Lichtenstein Strauss (/ˈstrɔːz/; January 31, 1896 – January 21, 1974) was an American government official, businessman, philanthropist, and naval officer. He was one of the original members of the United States Atomic Energy Commission (AEC) in 1946 and he served as the commission's chairman in the 1950s. Strauss was a major figure in the development of nuclear weapons after World War II, nuclear energy policy, and nuclear power in the United States.

Raised in Richmond, Virginia, Strauss became an assistant to Herbert Hoover as part of the Commission for Relief in Belgium during World War I and the American Relief Administration after that. Strauss then worked as an investment banker at Kuhn, Loeb & Co. during the 1920s and 1930s, where he amassed considerable wealth. As a member of the executive committee of the American Jewish Committee and several other Jewish organizations in the 1930s, Strauss made several attempts to change U.S. policy in order to accept more refugees from Nazi Germany but was unsuccessful. He also came to know and fund some of the research of refugee nuclear physicist Leo Szilard. During World War II, Strauss served as an officer in the U.S. Navy Reserve and rose to the rank of rear admiral due to his work in the Bureau of Ordnance in managing and rewarding plants engaged in production of munitions.

As a founding commissioner with the AEC during the early years of the Cold War, Strauss emphasized the need to protect U.S. atomic secrets and to monitor and stay ahead of atomic developments within the Soviet Union. Accordingly, he was a strong proponent of developing the hydrogen bomb. During his stint as chairman of the AEC, Strauss urged the development of peaceful uses of atomic energy, and he predicted that atomic power would make electricity "too cheap to meter". At the same time, he downplayed the possible health effects of radioactive fallout such as that experienced by Pacific Islanders following the Castle Bravo thermonuclear test.

Strauss was the driving force behind physicist J. Robert Oppenheimer's security clearance hearing, held in April and May 1954 before an AEC Personnel Security Board, in which Oppenheimer's security clearance was revoked. President Dwight D. Eisenhower's nomination of Strauss to become U.S. secretary of commerce resulted in a prolonged, public political battle in 1959 where Strauss was not confirmed by the U.S. Senate.

== Early life ==
Strauss was born in Charleston, West Virginia, the son of Lewis Strauss, a successful shoe wholesaler, and his wife Rosa (née Lichtenstein)Fa. Their parents were émigrés of German-Jewish and Austrian-Jewish origins who came to the United States in the 1830s and 1840s and settled in Virginia. His family moved to Richmond, Virginia, and he grew up and attended public schools there. At the age of ten, he lost much of the vision in his right eye in a rock fight, which later disqualified him from normal military service.

Having developed an amateur's knowledge from reading textbooks, Strauss planned to study physics. He was on track to be valedictorian of his class at John Marshall High School, which would have entitled him to a scholarship to the University of Virginia, but typhoid fever in his senior year made him unable to take final exams or graduate with his classmates.

By the time he finally graduated from high school, his family's business had experienced a downturn during the Recession of 1913–1914. In order to help out, Strauss decided to work as a traveling shoe salesman for his father's company. In his spare time, Strauss studied his Jewish heritage. He was quite successful in his sales efforts; over the next three years, he saved $20,000 (equivalent to $503,000 in 2025): enough money to cover college tuition now that the scholarship offer was no longer in effect.

== Career ==
=== World War I ===
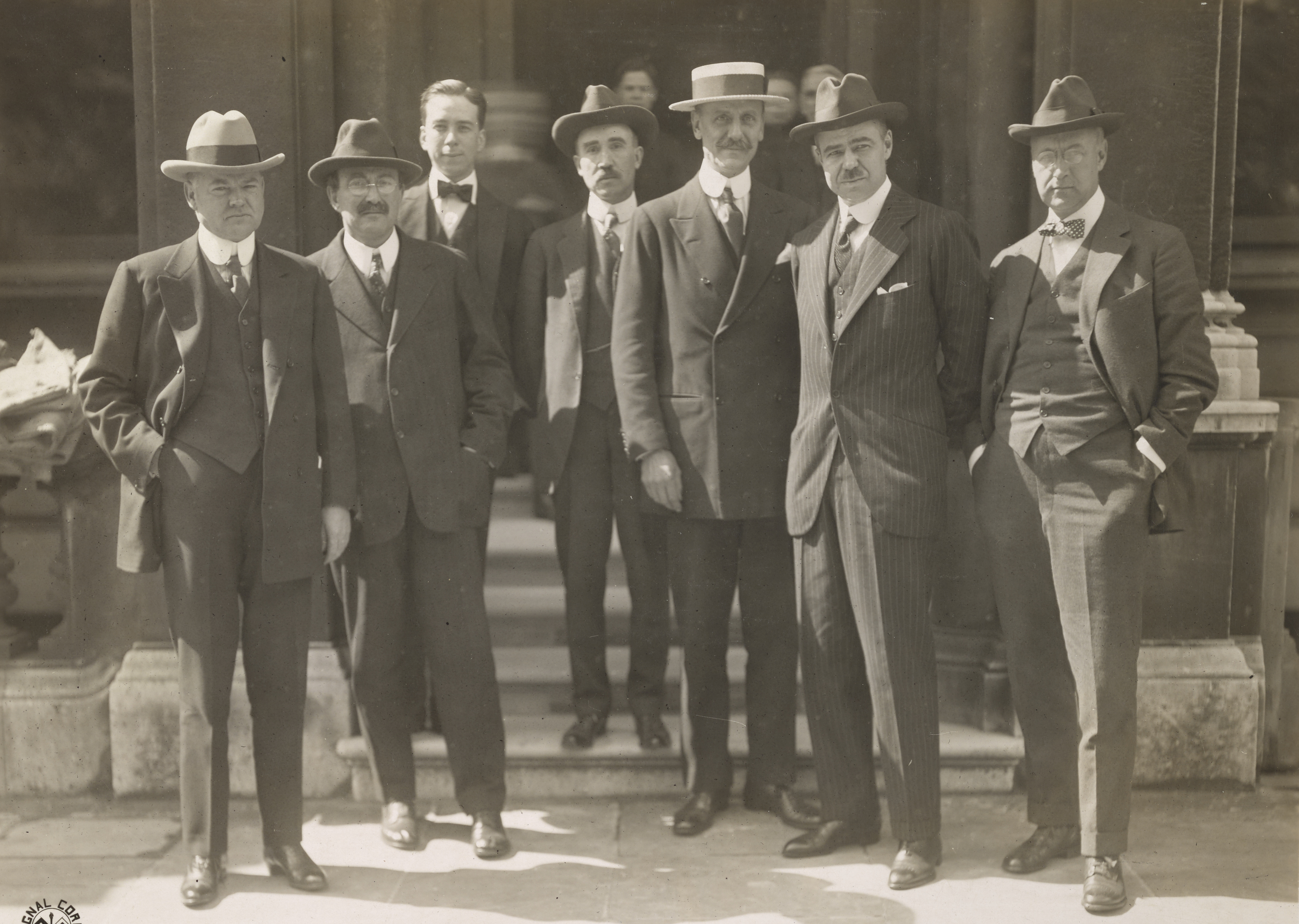
American food administrators in 1918: Hoover is on the far left, Strauss third from left

Strauss's mother encouraged him to perform public or humanitarian service. It was 1917; World War I was continuing to devastate parts of Europe and Herbert Hoover had become a symbol of humanitarian altruism by way of heading the Commission for Relief in Belgium. Accordingly, Strauss took the train to Washington, D.C., and talked his way into serving without pay as an assistant to Hoover. (Strauss and his biographer differ on whether this happened in February or May 1917, but the latter seems more likely.)

Hoover became chief of the United States Food Administration. Strauss worked well and soon was promoted to Hoover's private secretary and confidant. In that position he made powerful contacts that would serve him later on. One such contact he made was with attorney Harvey Hollister Bundy. Another was with Robert A. Taft, a counsel for the Food Administration.

Following the Armistice of 11 November 1918, Hoover became head of the post-war American Relief Administration, headquartered in Paris, and Strauss joined him there once more as his private secretary. Acting on behalf of a nearly destitute diplomatic representative of Finland, Rudolf Holsti, whom he met in Paris, Strauss persuaded Hoover to urge President Woodrow Wilson to recognize Finland's independence from Russia.

Besides the U.S. food relief organization, Strauss worked with the American Jewish Joint Distribution Committee (JDC) to relieve the suffering of Jewish refugees, who were often neglected by other bodies. Strauss acted as a liaison between Hoover's organization and JDC workers in a number of Central and Eastern European countries. Getting news in April 1919 of the Pinsk massacre, during the Polish–Soviet War, in which 35 Jews meeting to discuss the distribution of American relief aid were summarily executed by the Polish Army in the belief that they were Bolshevik conspirators, Strauss pressed the case to Hoover that a forceful response must be made to the Polish government. Hoover spoke to Polish Prime Minister Ignacy Jan Paderewski and demanded a fair investigation, but Strauss saw Paderewski as an anti-Semite who believed that all Jews were Bolsheviks and all Bolsheviks were Jews. After a while, the situation for Jews in Poland did (temporarily) improve.

Strauss had grown up in Virginia, in a culture that venerated Southern military heroes of the "War Between the States", but a tour he took in summer 1918 to the devastated battlefields of Château-Thierry and Belleau Wood disabused him of any romantic illusions about the glory of warfare. Similarly, his exposure to effects of Communism in 1919, as manifested in the Polish–Soviet War, led to a powerful and lifelong anti-Communist sentiment.

=== Investment banker, marriage and family ===
At the JDC, Strauss came to the attention of Felix M. Warburg, a JDC leader who was a partner in the investment bank Kuhn, Loeb & Co. in New York City, and Harriet Loewentstein, a JDC European head who was an accountant at the bank. In addition Hoover had introduced Strauss to Mortimer Schiff, another partner at Kuhn Loeb, who interviewed Strauss in Paris and offered him a job. In so doing, Strauss turned down an offer to become comptroller for the newly forming League of Nations.

Strauss returned to the United States and started at Kuhn Loeb in 1919. As a result, he never did attend college, a fact that may have led to the perfectionist and defensive personality traits that he exhibited later in life.

Kuhn Loeb's major customers were railroads, and by the mid-1920s, Strauss was helping to arrange financing for new railroad terminal buildings in Cincinnati and Richmond and for the reorganizations of the Denver and Rio Grande Western Railroad and the Chicago, Milwaukee, St. Paul and Pacific Railroad. By 1926 his yearly compensation from the firm had reached $75,000 (equivalent to $1,364,000 in 2025) and by the next year, $120,000 (equivalent to $2,224,000 in 2025). Subsequently, Strauss arranged the firm's financing for steel companies such as Inland Steel, Republic Steel, and Great Lakes Steel. He became a full partner in 1929, at which point he was making a million dollars a year, and he endured the Wall Street Crash of 1929 without significant financial damage. With the firm he helped bring to market Kodachrome film for Eastman Kodak and the Polaroid camera for Edwin H. Land.

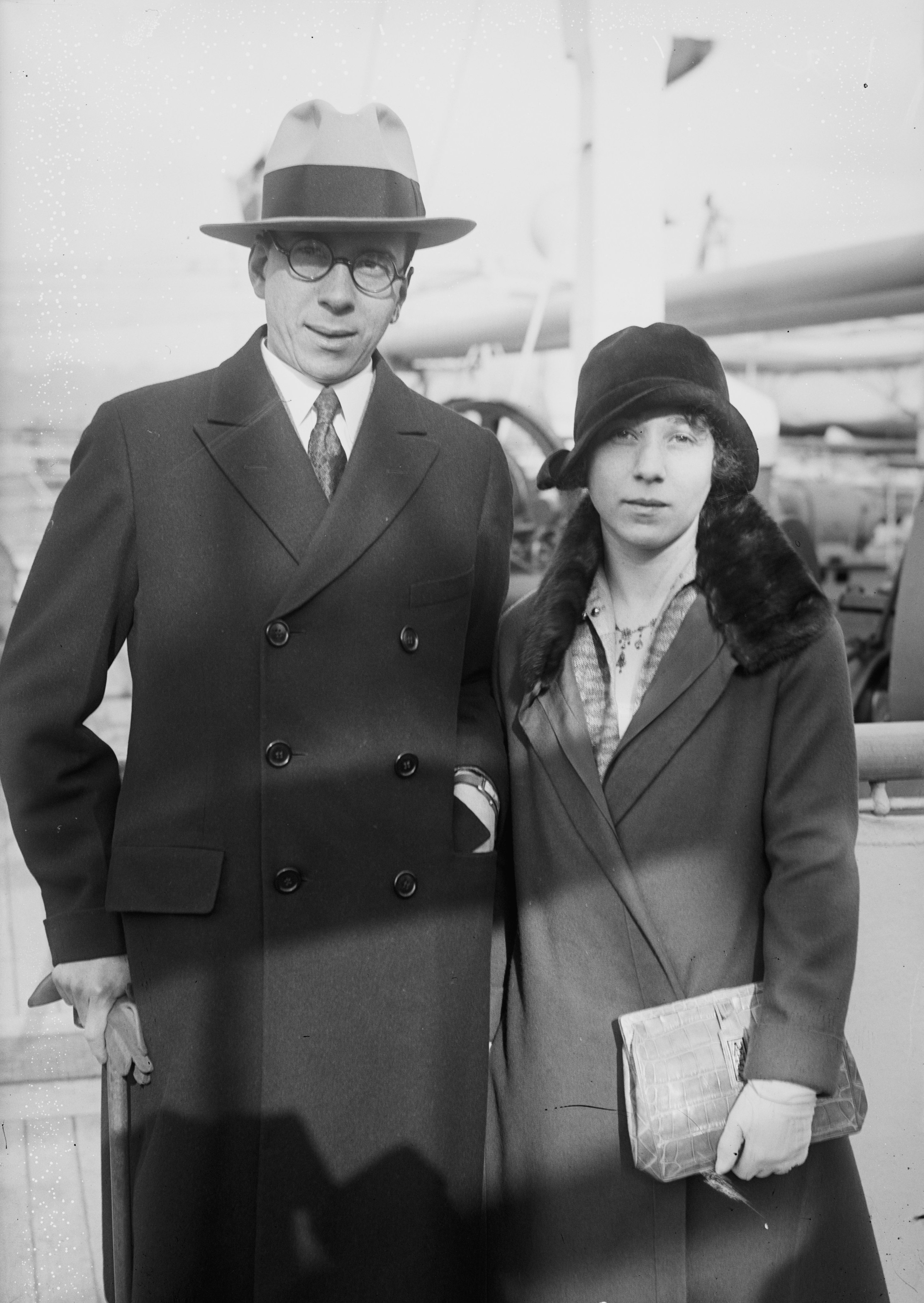
Strauss and his wife Alice, c. 1923–1926

On March 5, 1923, Strauss married Alice Hanauer in a ceremony at the Ritz-Carlton Hotel in New York. Born in 1903, she was the daughter of Jerome J. Hanauer, who was one of the Kuhn Loeb partners. She was a New York native who had attended Vassar College and was a skilled equestrian and potter. The couple had two sons, one of whom did not survive early childhood. While in New York, they lived on Central Park West, then on the Upper East Side, and later on Central Park South.

Strauss had involvements in the New York City community. In particular, he was on the board of directors of the Metropolitan Opera Company and later the Metropolitan Opera Association and was also on the boards of the American Relief Administration and the American Children's Fund. He was a member of American Bankers Association and New York State Chamber of Commerce.

Hoover was a candidate for the Republican Party nomination in the United States presidential election, 1920; Strauss campaigned for him and attended the 1920 Republican National Convention on his behalf, but Hoover failed to gain significant support. Strauss again worked for the this-time-successful campaign of Hoover in the United States presidential election, 1928, and was a member from Virginia that year of the Republican National Committee. Over several years, Strauss engaged in activities designed to strengthen the Republican Party in Virginia and the South overall. He also was committed to protecting the reputation of President Hoover; in 1930, on behalf of the White House, he conspired with two naval intelligence officers to illegally break into the office of a Tammany Hall follower in New York who was thought to hold documents that would be damaging to Hoover.

During the 1930s, following Hoover's re-election defeat by Franklin D. Roosevelt in the United States presidential election, 1932, Strauss was a strong opponent of the New Deal. He shared this antipathy with Hoover, who increasingly adopted an ideologically conservative, anti-New Deal viewpoint in the years following his defeat.

Strauss was active in Kuhn Loeb until 1941, although he resented restrictions imposed on investment banking by regulators in the Roosevelt administration and derived less enjoyment from the business. Nonetheless, in his role as an investment banker, Strauss had become vastly wealthy, and given his humble original circumstances he has been considered a self-made millionaire and a Horatio Alger tale. As one historian has written, Strauss's business success was the residue of "luck, pluck, hard work, and good contacts". Strauss's biographer reaches a similar conclusion: "Strauss reached the top because of his ability, ambition, choices of the right firm and the right wife, and the good luck to start out at a prosperous time." Due to his lack of higher education, Strauss has also been characterized as an autodidact.

=== Lay religious activities ===
A proudly religious man, Strauss became a leader in Jewish causes and organizations. In 1933 he was a member of the executive committee of the American Jewish Committee. He was active in the Jewish Agricultural Society, for whom by 1941 he was honorary president. By 1938 he was also active in the Palestine Development Council, the Baron de Hirsch Fund, and the Union of American Hebrew Congregations.

However, he was not a Zionist and opposed the establishment of a Jewish state in Mandatory Palestine. He did not view Jews as a nation or a race; he considered himself an American of Jewish religion, and consequently he advocated for the rights of Jews to live as equal and integral citizens of the nations in which they resided.

Strauss fully recognized the brutality of Nazi Germany. He first made his concern known in early 1933, writing to President Hoover during the final weeks of Hoover's time in office. Strauss attended a London conference of concerned Jews later that year on behalf of the American Jewish Committee, but the conference fell apart over the issue of Zionism.

Following the November 1938 Kristallnacht attacks on Jews in Germany, Strauss attempted to persuade prominent Republicans to support the Wagner–Rogers Bill that would legislatively allow the entry of 20,000 German refugee children into the United States. Long allied with both Hoover and Taft, he asked each of them to support the bill. Hoover did, but Taft did not, telling Strauss, "With millions of people out of work, I can't see the logic of admitting others." The bill had considerable popular support, but eventually failed to move forward in Congress due to opposition from the American Legion, the Daughters of the American Revolution, and other immigration restrictionists.

At the same time, Strauss joined with Hoover and Bernard Baruch in supporting the establishment of a refugee state in Africa as a safe haven for all persecuted people, not just Jews, and pledged ten percent of his wealth towards it. This effort too failed to materialize. Still another scheme that involved Strauss concerned an international corporation, the Coordinating Foundation, that would be set up to effectively pay Germany an immense ransom in exchange for their allowing Jews to emigrate; that too did not happen. Strauss received many individual requests for help, but often was unable to. Decades later, Strauss wrote in his memoir: "The years from 1933 to the outbreak of World War II will ever be a nightmare to me, and the puny efforts I made to alleviate the tragedies were utter failures, save in a few individual cases—pitifully few."

Strauss was president of Congregation Emanu-El of New York, the largest such in New York City, for a decade, from 1938 to 1948. He was named to the presidency to replace Judge Irving Lehman, after having previously been chair of the temple's finance committee. He had first joined the board of trustees of the temple in 1929, when the congregation was absorbing the merger of Temple Beth-El.

Strauss succeeded in Washington's social and political circles despite that environment being notoriously anti-Semitic at the time. Indeed, experiences with anti-Semitism may have contributed to the outsider perspective and fractious personality that became evident during his later career. He was proud of his Southern upbringing as well as his religion, and insisted his name be pronounced in Virginia fashion as "straws" rather than with the usual German pronunciation.

=== World War II ===
Despite his medical disqualification for regular military duty, Strauss applied to join the U.S. Navy Reserve in 1925, becoming effective 1926, and he received an officer's commission as a lieutenant intelligence officer. He remained in the reserve as a lieutenant commander. In 1939 and 1940, as World War II began overseas, he volunteered for active duty. He wanted to go into intelligence but was blocked, reportedly because the Director of Naval Intelligence, U.S. Navy was prejudiced against Jews and because Strauss's contributions to B'nai B'rith had aroused suspicion on the part of FBI director J. Edgar Hoover and others in the U.S. intelligence community. Instead, in February 1941, he was called to active duty, and was assigned as a Staff Assistant to the Chief at the Bureau of Ordnance, where he helped organize and manage Navy munitions work. Strauss and his wife moved to Washington, D.C., where they lived in an apartment at the prestigious Shoreham Hotel. She served as an operating room nurse's aide during this period.

During 1941, Strauss recommended actions to improve inspectors' abilities and consolidate field inspections into one General Inspectors' Office that was independent of the Navy's bureau system; these changes took hold by the following year. Strauss organized a morale-boosting effort to award "E for Excellence" awards to plants doing a good job of making war materials. The program proved popular and helped the United States ramp up production quickly in case it entered the war; by the end of 1941 the Bureau of Ordnance had given the "E" to 94 different defense contractors. It was adopted across all services in 1942 as the Army-Navy "E" Award, and over the course of the war over 4,000 of them were granted. (Strauss's biographer has depicted Strauss as also helping to investigate the notorious failures of U.S. torpedoes during the war and coordinate development of the very secret and highly successful anti-aircraft VT (proximity) fuse; however histories of these efforts do not indicate that Strauss played a significant role.)

When James V. Forrestal succeeded Frank Knox as Secretary of the Navy in May 1944, he employed Strauss as his special assistant. In conjunction with Senator Harry F. Byrd of Virginia, Strauss established the Office of Naval Research, which kept scientific research of naval matters under control of the Navy rather than civilian or academic organizations. Strauss's contributions were recognized by the Navy and by 1945 he was serving on the Army-Navy Munitions Board, a role that concluded by the following year. He was also on the Naval Reserve Policy Board starting in 1946.

Earlier during the war, Strauss was promoted to commander, then by November 1943 was a captain. He rose in rank and influence due to a combination of his intelligence, personal energy, and ability to find favor in higher places. Strauss's rigid manner managed to make enemies during the war as well, including significant disputes with E. N. Toland, chief counsel for the House Committee on Naval Affairs; Representative Carl Vinson, chair of that committee; and Admiral Ernest J. King, the Chief of Naval Operations. A proposed promotion for Strauss in 1944 to rear admiral did not happen at the time due to a variety of factors, including that President Franklin D. Roosevelt had disliked Strauss for years, going back to an incident at an Inner Circle event in 1932, and blocked the move. Roosevelt's death changed matters, as his successor, Harry S. Truman, had no negative feelings about Strauss. In July 1945 Strauss was promoted to commodore. Then in November 1945, after the war, Strauss was promoted to rear admiral by Truman.

The promotion to flag rank was unusual for a member of the reserve, and as such, he liked being addressed as "Admiral Strauss", even though use of the honorific perturbed some regular officers, who considered him a civilian. By this time, Strauss had taken advantage of his ties in both Washington and Wall Street to enter the post-war establishment in the capital. He also was learning how to get things accomplished in Washington via unofficial back channels, something at which he would become quite adept.

=== Introduction to atomic energy ===
Strauss's mother died of cancer in 1935, and his father of the same disease in 1937. That and his early interest in physics led Strauss to establish a fund in their names, the Lewis and Rosa Strauss Memorial Fund, for physics research that could lead to better radiation treatment for cancer patients. The fund supported the refugee German physicist Arno Brasch, who was working on producing artificial radioactive material with bursts of X-rays. Brasch's work was based on previous work with Leo Szilard, who saw in this work a possible means to developing an atomic chain reaction. Szilard already had foreseen that this could lead to an atomic bomb. Szilard persuaded Strauss to support him and Brasch in building a "surge generator". Strauss ultimately provided tens of thousands of dollars to this venture.

Through Szilard, Strauss met other nuclear physicists, such as Ernest Lawrence. Strauss talked to scientists who had left Nazi Germany and learned about atom-related experiments that had taken place there. Szilard kept him up to date on developments in the area, such as the discovery of nuclear fission and the use of neutrons. In February 1940, Szilard asked him to fund the acquisition of some radium, but Strauss refused, as he had already spent a large sum.

Strauss had no further direct involvement with atomic energy developments during the war. Indeed, he was frustrated by Harvey Hollister Bundy, his colleague from the Food Administration days, who kept Strauss away from information regarding the Manhattan Project. At the end of the war, when the first atomic bombs were ready for use, Strauss advocated to Forrestal dropping one on a symbolic target, such as a Japanese cedar grove near Nikkō, Tochigi, as a warning shot. In subsequent years Strauss would say in interviews, "I did my best to prevent it. The Japanese were defeated before the bomb was used."

After the war, Strauss was the Navy's representative on the Interdepartmental Committee on Atomic Energy. Strauss recommended a test of the atomic bomb against a number of modern warships, which he thought would refute the idea that the atomic bomb made the Navy obsolete. His recommendation contributed to the decision to hold the mid-1946 Operation Crossroads tests, the first since the war, at Bikini Atoll.

=== Atomic Energy Commission member ===
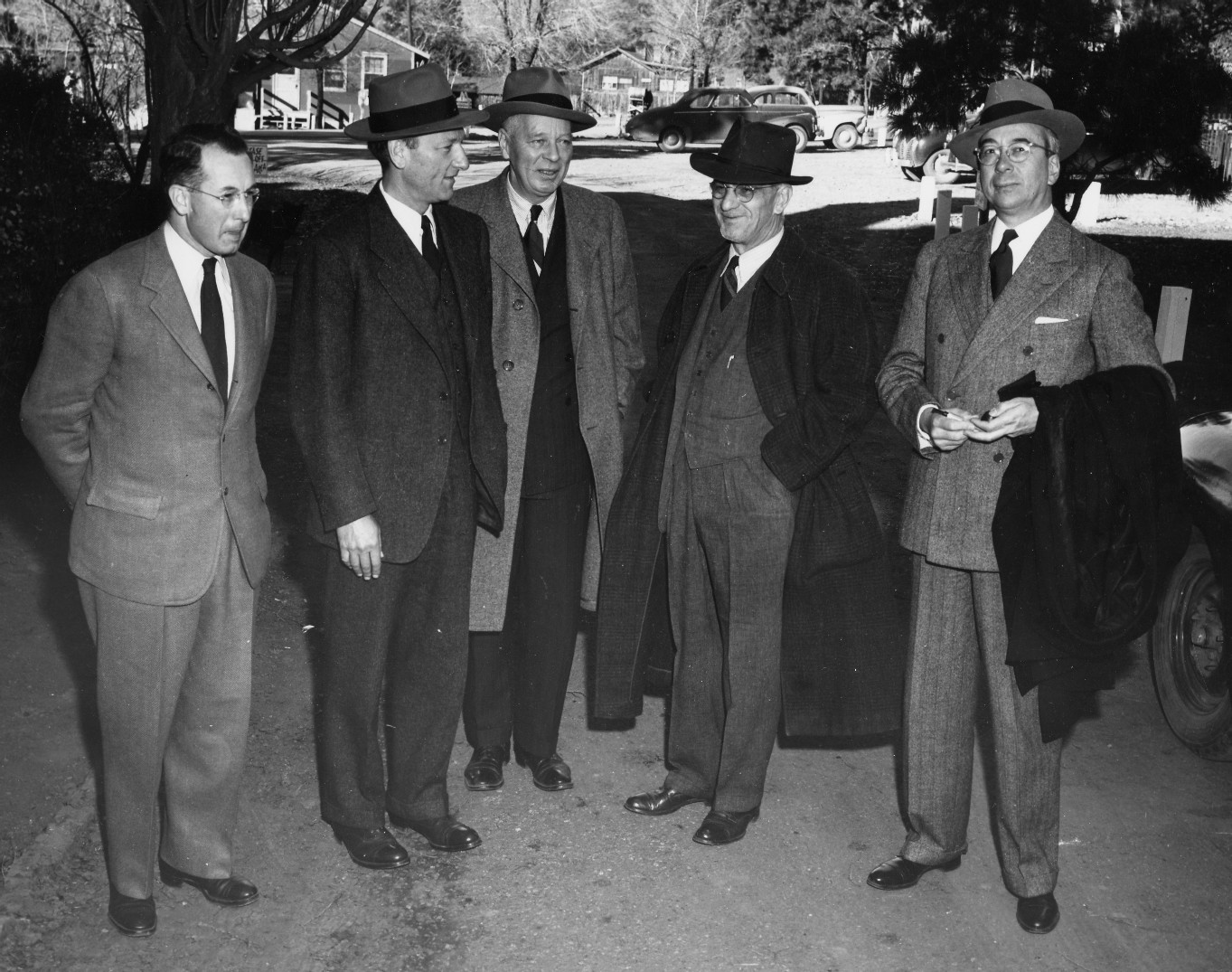
The five original commissioners of the AEC in 1947; Strauss is rightmost

In 1947, the United States transferred control of atomic research from the U.S. Army to civilian authority under the newly created Atomic Energy Commission (AEC). In October 1946, in advance of the commission actually coming into being, Strauss was named by President Truman as one of the first five Commissioners, with David E. Lilienthal as the chairman. Strauss had been recommended for a position on the body by Vice Admiral Paul Frederick Foster, a long-time friend for whom Strauss earlier had provided contacts in the business world (and who had subsequently helped Strauss get his active duty assignment). In their initial discussion about the appointment, Strauss noted to the New Deal-supporting Truman that "I am a black Hoover Republican." Truman said that was of no matter, since the commission was intended to be non-political. Strauss, who briefly had returned to work at Kuhn Loeb after the war, now exited the firm altogether in order to comply with AEC regulations.

Once there, Strauss became one of the first commissioners to speak in dissent from existing policy. In the first two years, there were a dozen instances, most having to do with information-security matters, in which Strauss was in a 1–4 minority on the commission; in the process, he increasingly was perceived as stubborn.

One of Strauss's first actions on the AEC was to urge his fellow commissioners to set up the capability to monitor foreign atomic activity via atmospheric testing. In particular, he saw that WB-29 Superfortress aircraft equipped with radiological tests could run regular "sniffer" flights to monitor the upper atmosphere and detect any atomic tests by the Soviet Union. Other people in government and science, including physicists J. Robert Oppenheimer and Edward Teller, argued that the radiological approach would not work, but Strauss and the newly formed United States Air Force continued regardless. Several days after the first atomic bomb test by the Soviet Union in August 1949, a WB-29 flight did, in fact, find evidence of the test. While Strauss was not the only person who had been urging long-range detection capabilities, it was largely due to his efforts that the United States was able to discover that the Soviet Union had become a nuclear power.

Strauss believed in a fundamental premise of the Cold War: that the Soviet Union was determined on a course of world domination. As such, he believed in having a more powerful nuclear force than the Soviets and in maintaining secrecy about U.S. nuclear activities. This extended to allies: Among the commissioners, he was the most skeptical about the value of the Modus Vivendi to which the United States, Britain, and Canada agreed in January 1948 that provided for limited sharing of technical information between the three nations (and that already was a stricter set of guidelines than those established by President Franklin D. Roosevelt in the Quebec Agreement of the Manhattan Project era). During the U.S. presidential election of 1948, Strauss tried to convince the Republican Party nominee, Thomas E. Dewey, of the dangers of sharing atomic information with Britain, and, after Dewey lost, Strauss tried to convince President Truman of the same. Following the revelations about the British physicist Klaus Fuchs's espionage for the Soviet Union and the appointment of the former Marxist John Strachey as Secretary of State for War in the British Cabinet, Strauss argued that the Modus Vivendi should be suspended completely, but no other commissioner wanted to go to that extreme.

Strauss was known for his psychological rigidity; one of his fellow commissioners reportedly said, "If you disagree with Lewis about anything, he assumes you're just a fool at first. But if you go on disagreeing with him, he concludes you must be a traitor." Strauss was increasingly unhappy in his position, but President Truman indicated satisfaction with Strauss's work and the minority stances that he was taking on the commission.

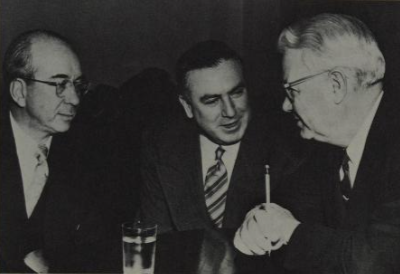
Strauss (left) along with Senators Brien McMahon and John Bricker in early 1950

The first atomic-bomb test by the Soviet Union in August 1949 came earlier than expected by Americans, and, over the next several months, there was an intense debate within the U.S. government, military, and scientific communities regarding whether to proceed with development of the far more powerful hydrogen bomb, then known as "the Super". Strauss urged for the United States to move immediately to develop it, writing to his fellow commissioners on October 5 that "the time has come for a quantum jump in our planning ... we should make an intensive effort to get ahead with the super." In particular, Strauss was unswayed by moral arguments against going forward, seeing no real difference between using it and the atomic bomb or the boosted fission weapon that some opponents of the Super were advocating as an alternative. When Strauss was rebuffed by the other commissioners, he went to National Security Council executive secretary Sidney Souers in order to bring the matter to President Truman directly. It was as a consequence of this meeting that Truman first learned (when Souers informed him) that such a thing as a hydrogen bomb could exist. In a memorandum urging development of the Super that he sent to President Truman on November 25, 1949, the pious Strauss expressed no doubt about what the Soviets would do, writing that "a government of atheists is not likely to be dissuaded from producing the weapon on 'moral' grounds."

On January 31, 1950, Truman decided to go forward with hydrogen-bomb development. A few narratives, including ones promoted by Strauss and that of Strauss's biographer, have placed Strauss as having had a central role in Truman's decision. However, by the time of the decision Strauss was one of an increasingly large coalition of military and government figures, and a few scientists, who strongly felt that development of the new weapon was essential to U.S. security in the face of a hostile, nuclear-capable, ideological enemy. Thus, in the absence of Strauss's action, the same decision almost surely would have been reached. In any case, considering that he had accomplished as much as he could in his role as commissioner, Strauss resigned on the day of Truman's decision. Within the administration, there was some consideration given to Strauss being named chairman of the AEC to replace the departing Lilienthal, but Strauss was considered too polarizing a figure. The last day for Strauss during this first stint of his on the commission was April 15, 1950.

=== Financial analyst ===
Beginning in June 1950, Strauss became a financial adviser to the Rockefeller brothers, where his charter was to participate in decisions regarding projects, financing, and investing. For them, he assisted in the founding of, and served on the first board for, the Population Council. He was also involved in the negotiations with Columbia University that led to a sale and leasing back of real estate associated with part of Rockefeller Center. The relationship with the Rockefeller brothers would last until 1953. However, Strauss felt that the brothers treated him as a second-class asset and, in turn, he felt no loyalty towards them.

During this time, Strauss continued to take an interest in atomic affairs; as did other former members of the AEC, he had a consulting arrangement with the United States Congress Joint Committee on Atomic Energy and was active in making his opinion known on various matters. These included his dissatisfaction with the speed at which research and development into actually making a working hydrogen device was taking place.

In the 1952 U.S. presidential election, Strauss originally supported Robert A. Taft, his friend from the Hoover days, for the Republican Party nomination. Once Dwight D. Eisenhower secured the nomination, however, Strauss contributed substantial monies towards Eisenhower's campaign.

=== Atomic Energy Commission chairman ===
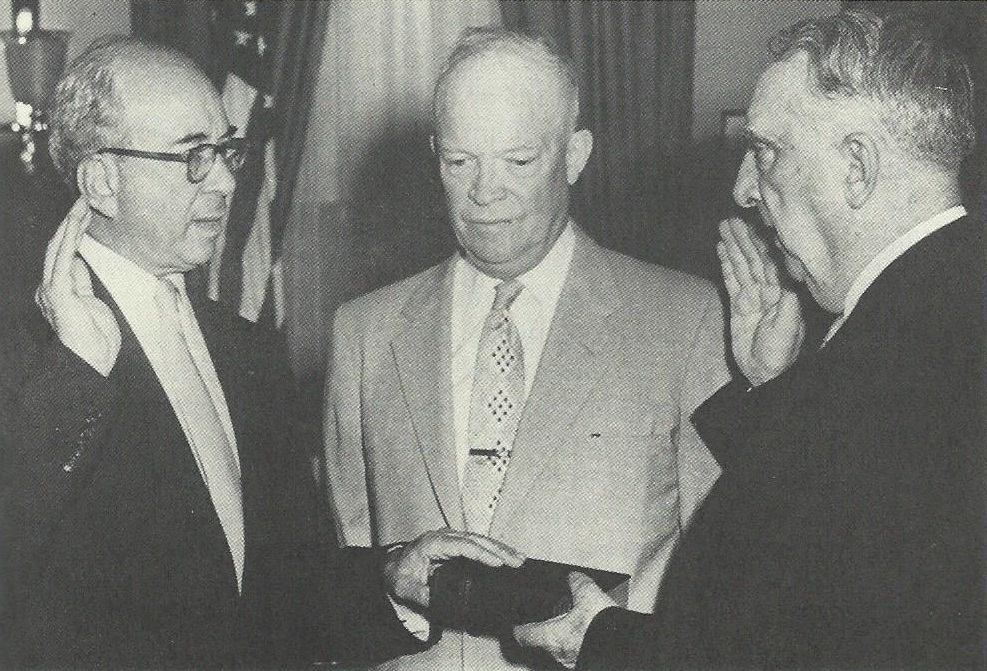
Strauss (left) taking the oath of office as chairman of the AEC in 1953

In January 1953, President Eisenhower named Strauss as presidential atomic energy advisor. Then in July 1953, Eisenhower named Strauss as chairman of the AEC.

While Strauss had initially opposed Eisenhower's push for Operation Candor, his view and the administration's goals both evolved, and he endorsed the "Atoms for Peace" program, which Eisenhower launched in December 1953. Strauss was now one of the best-known advocates of atomic energy for many purposes. In part, he celebrated the promise of peaceful use of atomic energy as part of a conscious effort to divert attention away from the dangers of nuclear warfare. Nevertheless, Strauss, like Eisenhower, did sincerely believe in and hope for the potential of peaceful uses. In 1955 Strauss helped arrange the U.S. participation in the first international conference on peaceful uses of atomic energy, held in Geneva. Strauss held Soviet capabilities in high regard, saying after the conference that "in the realm of pure science the Soviets had astonished us by their achievements ... [the Russians] could be described in no sense as technically backward."

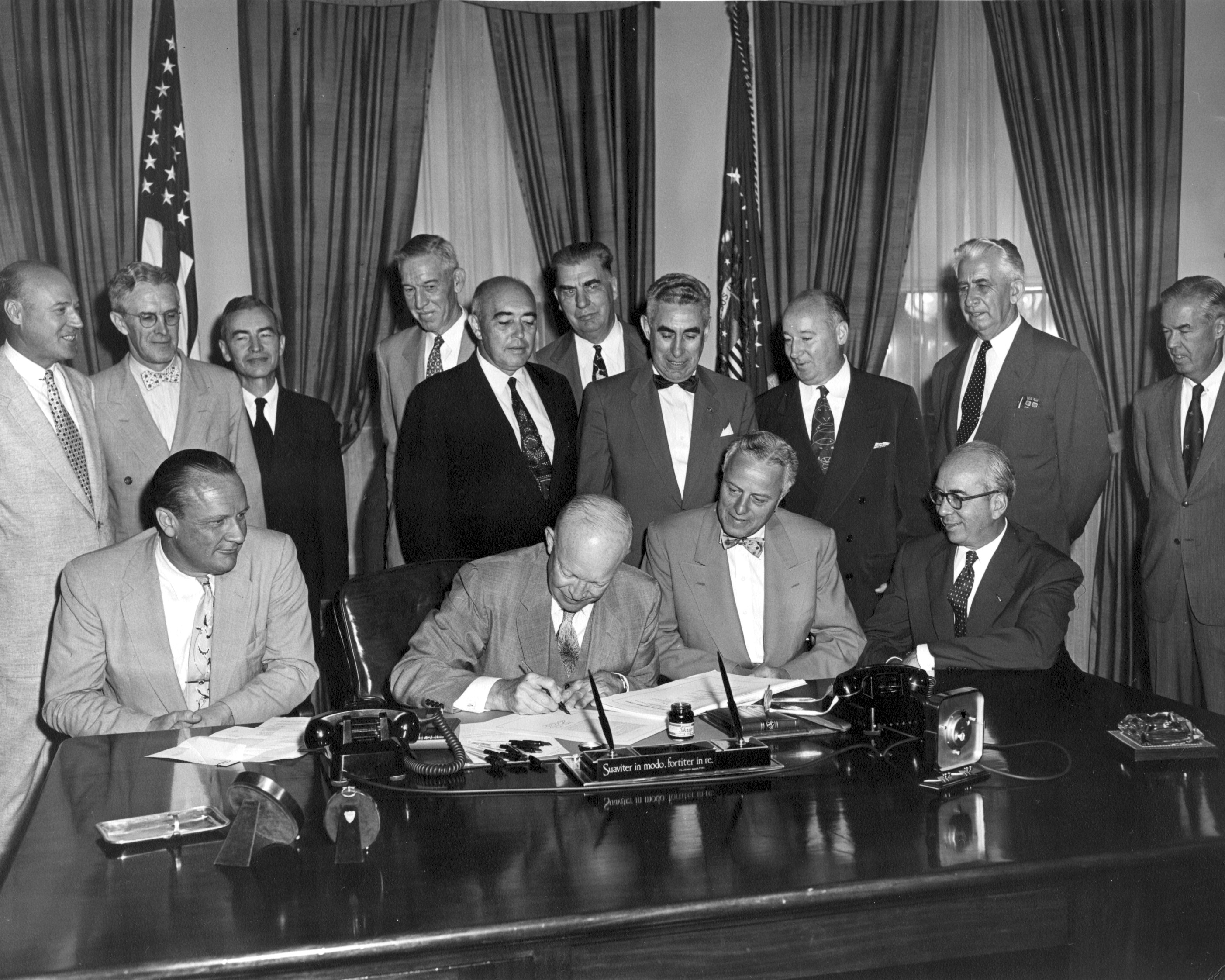
Eisenhower signing a modification of the Atomic Energy Act in 1954; Strauss is seated on the far right

Strauss was involved in finding the site and industry partners for the start of construction, in 1954, of the first dedicated U.S. atomic electric power plant, the Shippingport Atomic Power Station in Pennsylvania; it would eventually go on-line in 1957. While Shippingport was a joint government-commercial collaboration, Strauss advocated for private industry taking on the development of nuclear power plants on its own. Strauss made public remarks in 1954 predicting that atomic power would make electricity "too cheap to meter". Regarded as fanciful even at the time, the quote is now seen as damaging to the industry's credibility. Strauss was possibly referring to Project Sherwood, a secret program to develop power from hydrogen fusion, rather the commonly-believed uranium fission reactors. Indeed, on the run-up to a 1958 Geneva conference on atomic power, Strauss offered substantial funding to three laboratories for fusion power research.

Following the unexpectedly large blast of the Castle Bravo thermonuclear test of March 1954 at Bikini Atoll, there was international concern over the radioactive fallout experienced by residents of nearby Rongelap Atoll and Utirik Atoll and by the Daigo Fukuryū Maru, a Japanese fishing vessel. The AEC initially tried to keep the contamination secret, and then tried to minimize the health dangers of fallout. Voices began to be heard advocating for a ban or limitation on atmospheric testing of nuclear weapons. Strauss himself downplayed dangers from fallout and insisted that it was vital that a program of atmospheric blasts proceed unhindered; internally within the administration, Strauss was dismissive of the matter and even speculated that the Fukuryū Maru was part of a Communist scheme. However, Strauss also contributed to public fears when, during a March 1954 press conference, he made an impromptu remark that a single Soviet H-bomb could destroy the New York metropolitan area. The remark captured the immense destructiveness of the H-bomb and was featured in headlines in newspapers across the United States. This statement was heard overseas as well and served to add to what UK Minister of Defence Harold Macmillan termed a "panic" over the subject. The AEC had commissioned the Project SUNSHINE report in 1953 to ascertain the impact of radioactive fallout, generated from repeated nuclear detonations of greater and greater yield, on the world's population. The British asked the AEC for the report, but Strauss resisted giving them anything more than a heavily redacted version, leading to frustration on the part of Prime Minister Winston Churchill and other UK officials.

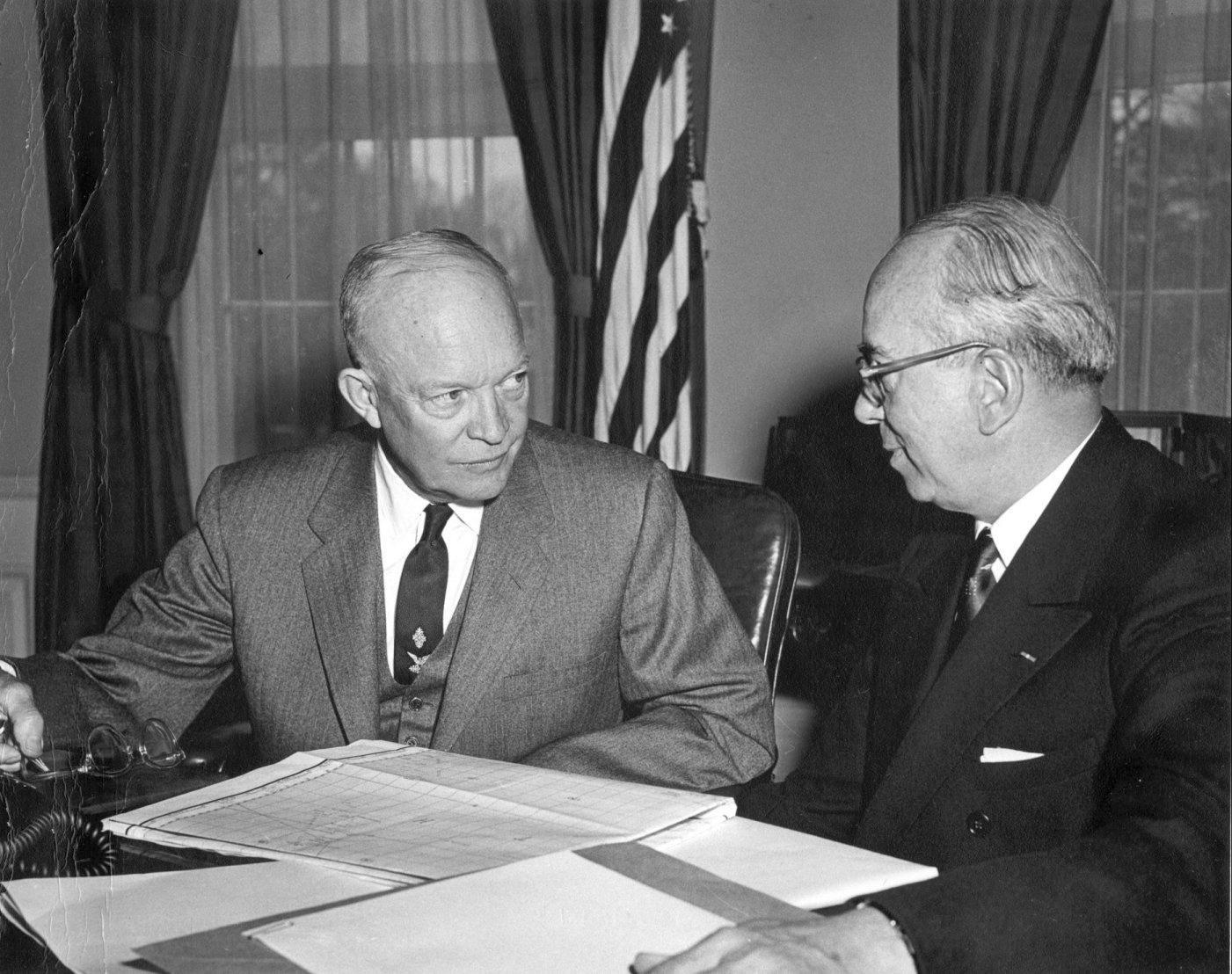
Eisenhower and Strauss discuss what happened with Castle Bravo, March 1954 ...

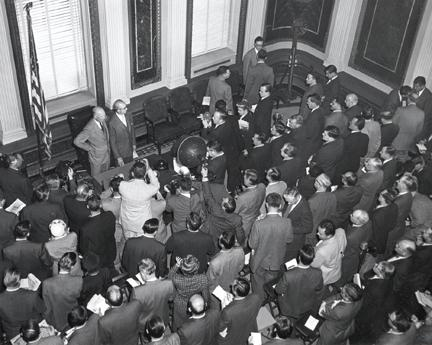
... and the following day hold the press conference at which Strauss says a single H-bomb could destroy the entire New York metropolitan area

Internal debate ensued over the next several years within the Eisenhower administration over the possibility of an atmospheric test ban with the Soviet Union, with some in favor of trying to arrange one, but Strauss was always one of those implacably opposed. Strauss would continue to minimize the dangers of Bravo fallout to the islanders of the atolls, insisting in his 1962 memoirs that they had been under "continuous and competent medical supervision" and that follow-up tests showed them to be in "excellent health [and] their blood counts were approximately normal". Others in the AEC were equally cavalier. In fact, AEC scientists had seen the islanders as a valuable laboratory case of human exposure. The Limited Test Ban Treaty banning atmospheric tests would not be arrived at until 1963, and the U.S. government engaged in a series of reevaluations of the health of the islanders, and relocation and economic packages to compensate them, over the next several decades. Strauss and others in the AEC were also dismissive of the dangers Americans faced who were downwind of the Nevada Test Site.

Regarding the prospect of nuclear proliferation, Strauss was skeptical that attempts to prevent it would accomplish anything, and Strauss and the AEC also doubted that the problem was as severe as some others in the administration maintained. During 1956, Harold Stassen, who had been chosen by Eisenhower to lead an effort on disarmament policy, focused on making nonprofileration a key goal of the United States, including proposals to halt not just testing but also the continued expansion of the U.S. fissionable material stockpile. Eisenhower was at least partially receptive to the proposals, but Strauss argued that nuclear materials production could not be stopped yet and that testing could never be halted completely.

The Sputnik crisis of 1957 led Eisenhower to create the President's Science Advisory Committee. Once that body was in place, Eisenhower began to directly receive a broader selection of scientific information; Strauss lost his ability to control scientists' access to the president and his influence within the administration began to recede. While Strauss had maintained his hostility towards Anglo-American cooperation on nuclear matters since becoming AEC chairman, Sputnik gave impetus to renewed cooperation on this front. Strauss visited Prime Minister Harold Macmillan to give a message from Eisenhower to this effect, and subsequent talks and hearings resulted in the 1958 US–UK Mutual Defence Agreement coming into place.

As AEC chairman, Strauss was informed regarding U.S. intelligence findings on the Dimona reactor in Israel. He met with Ernst David Bergmann, chairman of the Israel Atomic Energy Commission and a key early force in the Israeli nuclear program (and years later would help Bergmann get a visiting fellowship in the United States). While Strauss's thoughts on the Israeli effort to develop nuclear weapons are not documented, his wife later said that he would have been in favor of Israel being able to defend itself.

=== Strauss and Oppenheimer ===
During his terms as an AEC commissioner, Strauss became hostile to Oppenheimer, the physicist who had been director of the Los Alamos Laboratory during the Manhattan Project and who, after the war, became a celebrated public figure and remained in influential positions in atomic energy.

In 1947, Strauss, a trustee of the Institute for Advanced Study at Princeton, presented Oppenheimer with the institute's offer to be its director. Strauss, who as one writer notes was a man of high intelligence and financial skills if not higher education, had also been considered for the job; he was the institute's faculty's fifth-ranked choice, while Oppenheimer was their first ranked. Strauss, a conservative Republican, had little in common with Oppenheimer, a liberal who had had Communist associations. Oppenheimer subsequently was a leading opponent of moving ahead with the hydrogen bomb and proposed a national security strategy based on atomic weapons and continental defense; Strauss wanted the development of thermonuclear weapons and a doctrine of deterrence. Oppenheimer supported a policy of openness regarding the numbers and capabilities of the atomic weapons in America's arsenal; Strauss believed that such unilateral frankness would benefit no one but Soviet military planners.

In addition, Strauss disliked Oppenheimer on a variety of personal grounds. Starting in 1947, Strauss had been in a dispute with the General Advisory Committee (GAC) of senior atomic scientists, which Oppenheimer chaired and which reported to the AEC, over whether exporting radioisotopes for medical purposes was a risk to U.S. security, from which the scientists on the GAC developed a poor image of Strauss. Then during a public hearing in 1949, Oppenheimer had given a mocking answer to a point Strauss had raised on the subject, a humiliation that Strauss did not forget. Strauss was also offended that Oppenheimer had engaged in adulterous relations. And Strauss did not like that Oppenheimer had seemingly left his Jewish heritage behind, whereas Strauss had become successful – despite the anti-Semitic environment of Washington – while still maintaining his prominent roles in Jewish organizations and his Temple Emanu-El presidency.

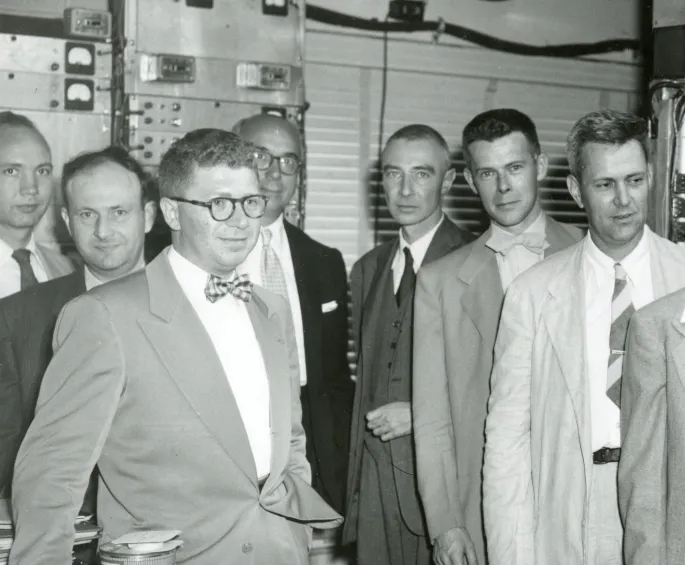
Strauss (center-left in rear) and Oppenheimer (alongside him, center-right in rear) in a group of scientists and engineers, c. 1953

When Eisenhower offered Strauss the AEC chairmanship, Strauss named one condition: Oppenheimer would be excluded from all classified atomic work. Oppenheimer held a highest-level Q clearance, and was one of the most respected figures in atomic science, briefing the President and the National Security Council on several occasions. Oppenheimer's AEC consultancy, and the clearance that went with it, had just been renewed for another year by Gordon Dean, the outgoing chairman of the AEC; it would extend through June 30, 1954.

Strauss's misgivings about Oppenheimer went beyond dislike and disagreement. He had become aware of Oppenheimer's former Communist affiliations before World War II and had begun to think that Oppenheimer might even be a Soviet spy. For instance, Strauss was suspicious of Oppenheimer's tendency to downplay Soviet capabilities. In 1953, Oppenheimer stated in the July edition of Foreign Affairs that he believed the Soviets were "about four years behind" in nuclear weapons development. The United States had exploded the first thermonuclear device the previous year; however, only a month after Oppenheimer made his proclamation, in August 1953, the Soviet Union declared that it had tested its own fusion-based bomb, which U.S. sensors identified as a boosted fission weapon. Strauss was not alone in having his doubts; a number of other officials in Washington also suspected that Oppenheimer might be a security risk.

In September 1953, Strauss, hoping to uncover evidence of Oppenheimer's disloyalty, asked FBI director J. Edgar Hoover to initiate surveillance to track Oppenheimer's movements. The director readily did so; the tracking uncovered no evidence of disloyalty but that Oppenheimer had lied to Strauss about his reason for taking a trip to Washington (Oppenheimer met a journalist but had told Strauss that he had visited the White House). Strauss's suspicions increased further with the discovery that in 1948 and 1949 Oppenheimer had tried to stop the long-range airborne detection system that Strauss had championed and that had worked in discovering the Soviet Union's first atomic weapon test. At first Strauss moved cautiously, even heading off an attack on Oppenheimer by Senator Joseph McCarthy, due to Strauss's belief that any case that McCarthy might make would be premature and lack a solid basis of evidence.

=== Oppenheimer security hearing ===
In November 1953, William L. Borden, the former executive director of the United States Congress Joint Committee on Atomic Energy, wrote a letter to the FBI alleging that "more probably than not J. Robert Oppenheimer is an agent of the Soviet Union." According to the book American Prometheus, Strauss collaborated and aided Borden in making the allegations against Oppenheimer. This action set into motion a chain of events. On December 3, 1953, Eisenhower, after consulting with Strauss and others, ordered a "blank wall" between Oppenheimer and all areas of government. On December 21, Strauss told Oppenheimer that his security clearance had been suspended, pending resolution of a series of charges outlined in a letter from Kenneth D. Nichols, general manager of the AEC. Rather than resign, Oppenheimer requested a hearing. Upon Strauss's request, FBI director Hoover ordered full surveillance on Oppenheimer and his attorneys, including tapping of phones; these wiretaps were illegal.

The hearing was held in April and May 1954, before an AEC Personnel Security Board. Strauss selected the three-man board, headed by Gordon Gray. He also picked the person who would lead the case against Oppenheimer, the trial attorney Roger Robb. Strauss had access to the FBI's information on Oppenheimer, including his conversations with his lawyers, which was used to prepare counterarguments against those lawyers in advance. Strauss was not present at the hearings, instead reading daily transcripts.

At the hearing, many top scientists, as well as government and military figures, testified on Oppenheimer's behalf. Physicist Isidor Isaac Rabi stated that the suspension of the security clearance was unnecessary: "he is a consultant, and if you don't want to consult the guy, you don't consult him, period."

Oppenheimer, however, admitted that he had previously lied to a military counterintelligence officer about a conversation his friend Haakon Chevalier had with him about passing nuclear secrets to the Soviets. He also admitted that he had stayed with Chevalier only the previous December. Leslie Groves, the former director of the Manhattan Project, testified that under the stricter security criteria in effect in 1954, he "would not clear Dr. Oppenheimer today".

At the conclusion of the hearings, Oppenheimer's clearance was revoked by a 2–1 vote of the board. They unanimously cleared Oppenheimer of disloyalty, but a majority found that 20 of the 24 charges were either true or substantially true and that Oppenheimer would represent a security risk. Then on June 29, 1954, the AEC upheld the findings of the Personnel Security Board, by a 4–1 decision, with Strauss writing the majority opinion. In that opinion, Strauss stressed Oppenheimer's "defects of character", "falsehoods, evasions and misrepresentations", and past associations with Communists and people close to Communists as the primary reasons for his determination. He did not comment on Oppenheimer's loyalty.

Oppenheimer was thus stripped of his clearance: one day before it would have expired, and seven months after it had been suspended on the orders of the president.

The successor agency to the AEC later ruled that the hearing was "a flawed process that violated the Commission's own regulations." The loss of his security clearance ended Oppenheimer's role in government and policy. Oppenheimer returned to his directorship at the Institute of Advanced Studies, but Strauss, who was still on the board of trustees there, attempted to have him dismissed. However, in October 1954, the board voted to keep Oppenheimer on. In the years that followed, Strauss still hoped to remove Oppenheimer, but never got the votes on the board he needed.

In the wake of the AEC decision, public opinion and most scientists were firmly against Strauss. Nearly 500 of the scientists at Los Alamos Scientific Laboratory signed a petition saying "this poorly founded decision ... will make it increasingly difficult to obtain adequate scientific talent in our defense laboratories." Strauss responded by first sending a letter to the petitioners saying that they were not trying to quash the expression of professional opinions – "We certainly do not want 'yes men' in the employ of the Atomic Energy Commission" – and followed that with a July 1954 visit to the laboratory to try to mollify the scientists. An editorial in The New Mexican newspaper nicknamed Strauss's efforts as "Operation Butter-Up".

In 2022, Jennifer Granholm, the United States Secretary of Energy – head of the successor organization to the AEC – vacated the 1954 revocation of Oppenheimer's security clearance. Her decision was not based on revisiting the merits of the case against Oppenheimer, but rather on the flawed processes in the hearings that had violated the AEC's own regulations. Historian Alex Wellerstein states that Strauss had been a major culprit in those process violations.

=== Secretary of Commerce nomination ===
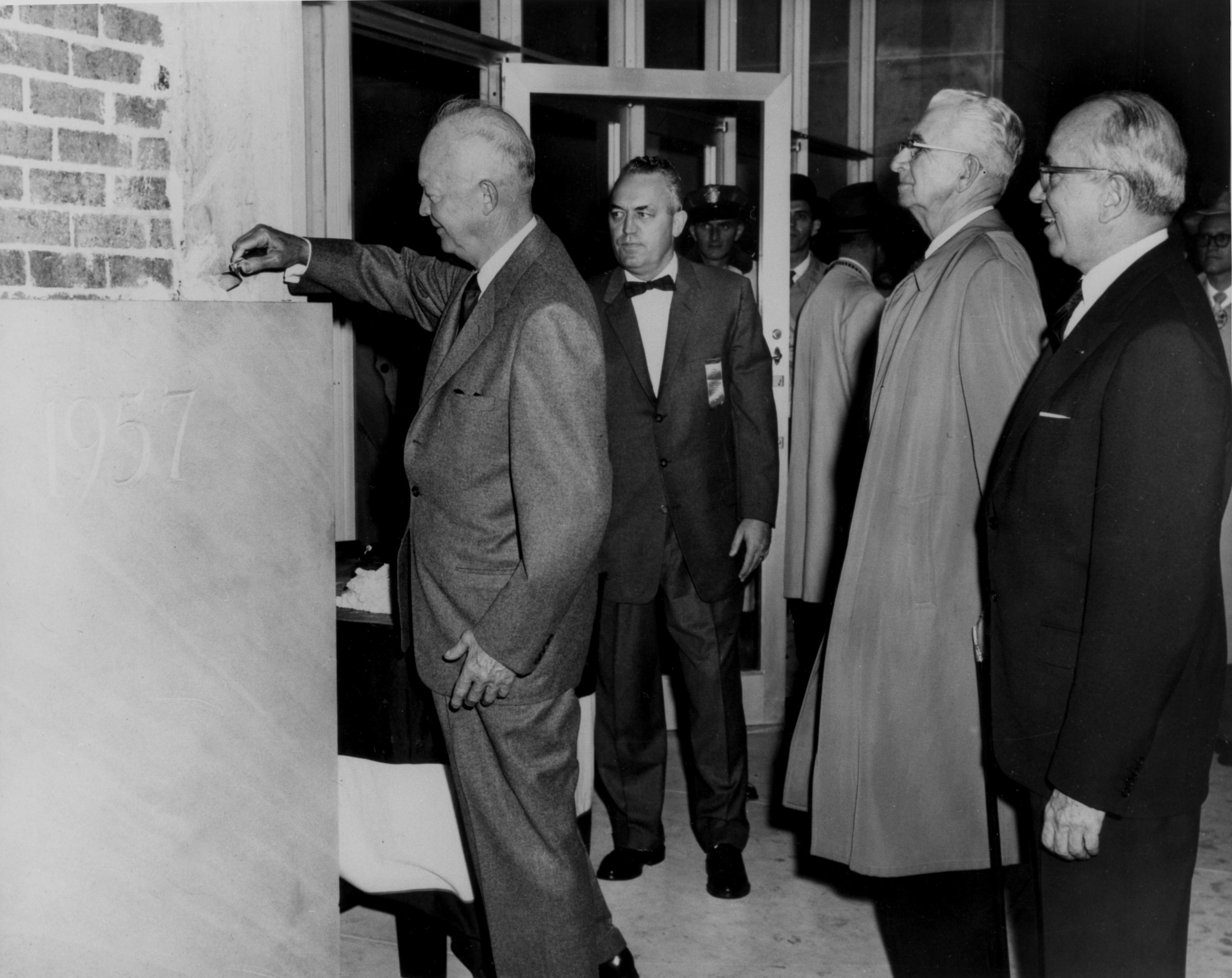
President Eisenhower lays the cornerstone of the new AEC building in Germantown, Maryland, in 1957 as AEC chairman Strauss (right) observes

Strauss's term as Atomic Energy Commission (AEC) chair completed at the end of June 1958. Eisenhower wanted to reappoint him, but Strauss feared the Senate would reject or at least subject him to ferocious questioning. Besides the Oppenheimer affair, he had clashed with Senate Democrats on several major issues, including his autocratic nature as AEC chair and his secretive handling of the Dixon–Yates contract. That contract involved a supply of electrical power in Tennessee without going through the Tennessee Valley Authority and Strauss had embarked on discussions about the idea without informing his fellow commissioners. The plan itself was controversial and eventually became a losing issue for Republicans in the 1954 U.S. midterm elections. Strauss had stated to an interviewer in late 1954, "For the first time in my life, I have enemies." By the end of the 1950s, Strauss had garnered the reputation, as a Time magazine profile put it, of being "one of the nation's ablest and thorniest public figures".

Eisenhower offered him the post of White House Chief of Staff to replace Sherman Adams but Strauss did not think it would suit him. Eisenhower also asked if Strauss would consider succeeding John Foster Dulles (who was ill) as Secretary of State but Strauss did not want to preempt Undersecretary Christian Herter, who was a good friend.

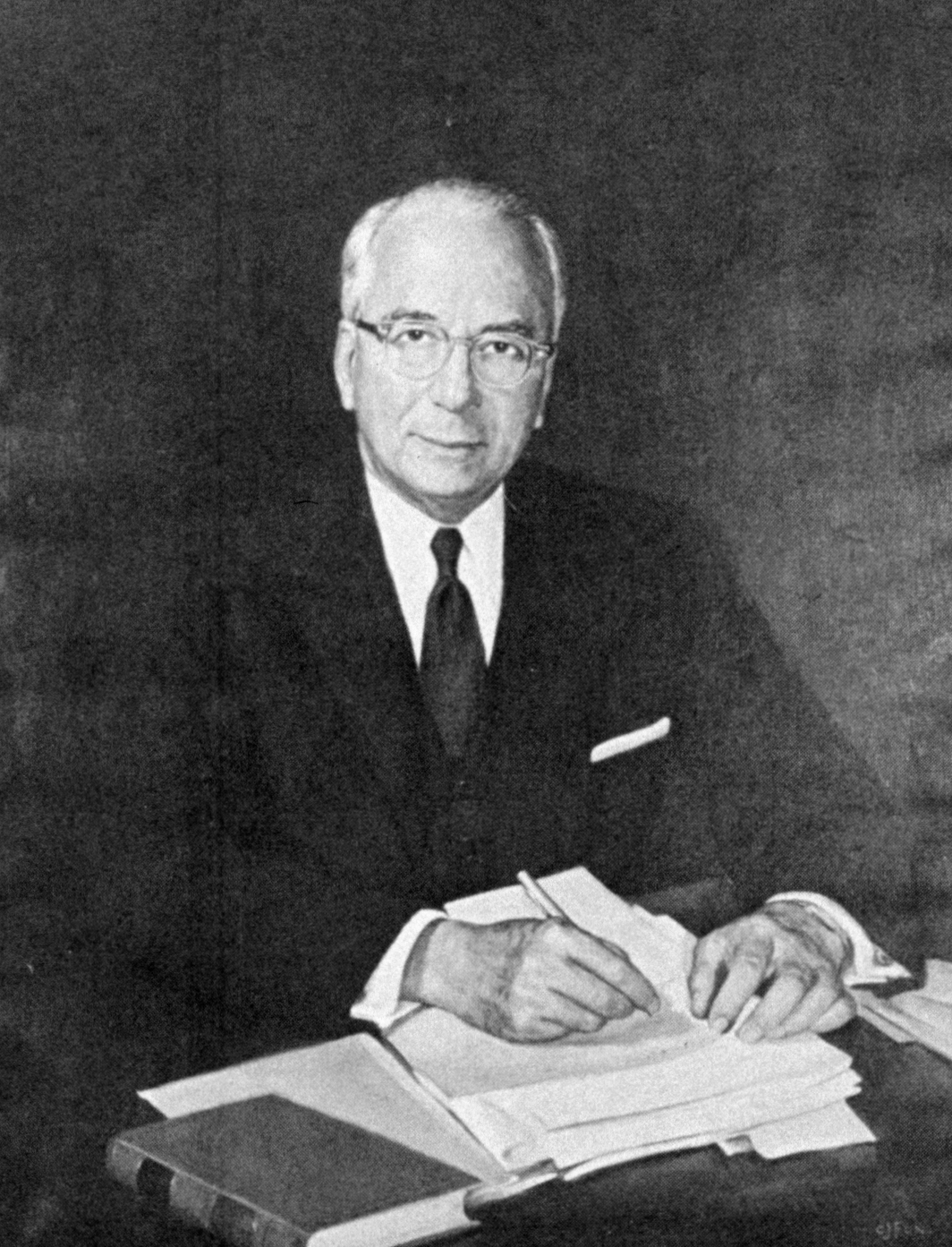
Strauss, c. 1959

Finally, Eisenhower proposed nominating Strauss as Secretary of Commerce and Strauss accepted. With the 1958 United States Senate elections imminent, Eisenhower appointed Strauss on October 24, Strauss took office via a recess appointment, effective November 13, 1958. However, Senate opposition to his appointment was as strong as a renewed AEC term. This was surprising, given the high level of experience Strauss had, the relative lack of prominence of the Commerce post compared to some other cabinet positions and the tradition of the Senate deferring to presidents to choose the cabinet heads they wanted. Indeed, at the time the previous thirteen nominees for this Cabinet position had won Senate confirmation in an average of eight days. Due to a long-running feud between the two, Senator Clinton Anderson of New Mexico took up the cause of preventing Strauss's confirmation by the Senate. Anderson found an ally in Senator Gale W. McGee on the Senate Commerce Committee, which had jurisdiction over Strauss's confirmation.

During and after the Senate hearings, McGee charged Strauss with "a brazen attempt to hoodwink" the committee. Strauss also overstated his role in the development of the H-bomb, implying that he had convinced Truman to support it. Truman was annoyed by this and sent a letter to Anderson undermining Strauss's claim, a letter that Anderson promptly leaked to the press. Strauss attempted to reach Truman through an intermediary to rescue the situation but was rebuffed and felt bitter at the lack of support. A group of scientists who were still upset over the role Strauss had played in the Oppenheimer hearings lobbied against confirmation, playing upon the pronunciation of their target's name by calling themselves the Last Straws Committee. Physicist David L. Hill, the former chairman of the Federation of American Scientists, was one of several scientists who testified before the Commerce Committee against Strauss's nomination, saying that "most of the scientists in this country would prefer to see Mr. Strauss completely out of the Government".

After sixteen days of hearings the Senate Commerce Committee recommended Strauss's confirmation to the full Senate by a vote of 9–8. By now the struggle was in the forefront of the national political news, with a Time cover story calling it "one of the biggest, bitterest, and in many ways most unseemly confirmation fights in Senate history". In preparation for the floor debate on the nomination, the Democratic majority's main argument against the nomination was that Strauss's statements before the committee included semi-truths and outright falsehoods and that under tough questioning Strauss tended towards ambiguous responses and engaging in petty arguments. Despite an overwhelming Democratic majority, the 86th United States Congress was not able to accomplish much of its agenda since the President had immense popularity and veto power. With the 1960 elections approaching, congressional Democrats looked for issues on which they could demonstrate their institutional strength in opposition to Eisenhower. On June 19, 1959, just after midnight, the Strauss nomination failed by a vote 46–49. Voting for Strauss were 15 Democrats and 31 Republicans, voting against him were 47 Democrats and 2 Republicans. The nays included future U.S. presidents John F. Kennedy and Lyndon B. Johnson.

It marked only the eighth instance in U.S. history in which a Cabinet appointee had failed to be confirmed by the Senate and it was the first time since Charles B. Warren in 1925, and would be the last one until John Tower in 1989. President Eisenhower, who had invested both personal and professional capital in the nomination of Strauss, spoke of the Senate action in bitter terms, saying that "I am losing a truly valuable associate in the business of government. ... it is the American people who are the losers through this sad episode." Strauss sent a letter of resignation from his recess appointment as Commerce Secretary on June 23, a resignation that took effect on June 30, 1959.

== Final years ==
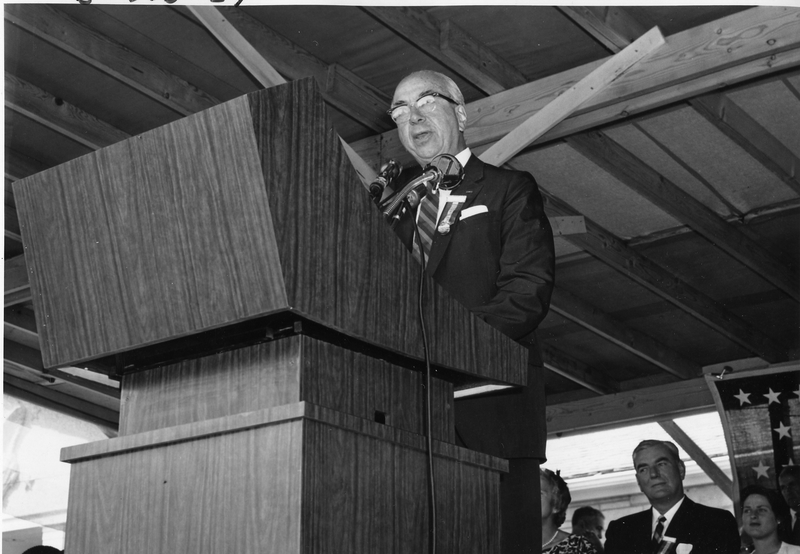
Strauss speaking at the dedication of the Herbert Hoover Presidential Library in 1962

The Commerce defeat effectively ended Strauss's government career. The numerous enemies that Strauss had made during his career took some pleasure from the turn of events. Strauss himself was hurt by the rejection and, never fully getting over it, tended to brood over events past.

Strauss published his memoir, Men and Decisions, in 1962. At the time, Time magazine's review said it "may now remind readers of [Strauss's] many real accomplishments before they were obscured by political rows." The book sold well, spending fifteen weeks on the New York Times Best Seller for non-fiction and rising as high as number five on that list. The general view of historians is that the memoir was self-serving.

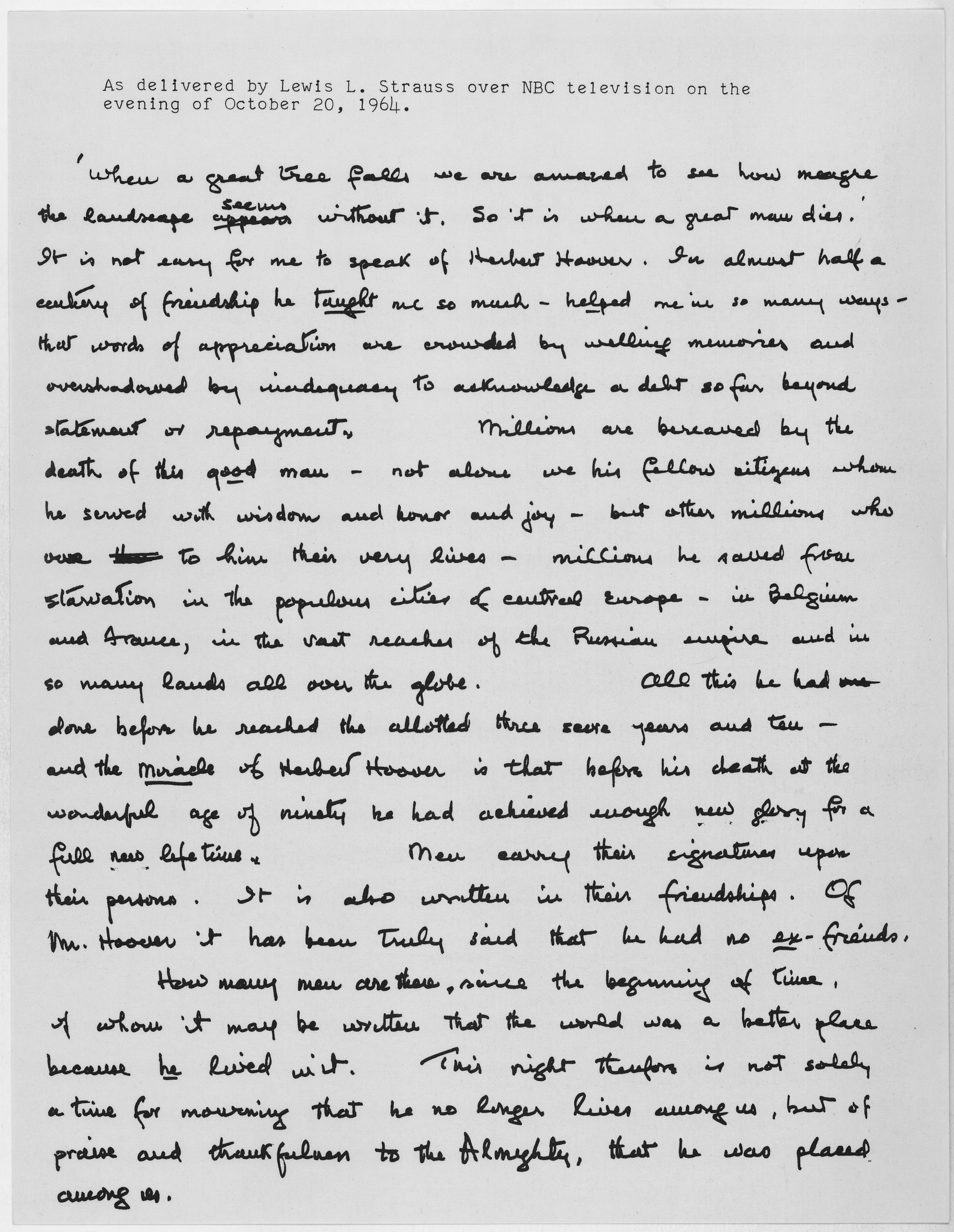
Handwritten text of eulogy read by Strauss over NBC television following the death of former President Hoover in 1964

The tie between Herbert Hoover and Strauss remained strong throughout the years; in 1962 Hoover wrote in a letter to Strauss: "Of all the men who have come into my orbit in life, you are the one who has my greatest affections, and I will not try to specify the many reasons, evidences or occasions." Strauss assisted in the organizing of support for the Barry Goldwater 1964 presidential campaign. He also remained on good terms with President Eisenhower and for several years in the 1960s Eisenhower and Strauss advocated construction of a nuclear-powered, regional desalination facility in the Middle East that would benefit both Israel and its Arab neighbors but the plan never found sufficient Congressional support to move forward.

During his retirement Strauss devoted time to philanthropic activities and to the American Jewish Committee, the Jewish Theological Seminary of America and the Alliance Israélite Universelle. He helped arrange a no-interest loan to fund a congregation building for the Los Alamos Jewish Center. He lived on a 2,000-acre (800 ha) farm, where he engaged in cattle breeding and raised prized Black Angus. A book he was working on about Herbert Hoover was never completed.

After battling lymphosarcoma for three years, Strauss died of it on January 21, 1974, at his home, the Brandy Rock Farm in Brandy Station, Virginia. His funeral was held in New York at Temple Emanu-El and there was also a memorial service held in the capital at Washington Hebrew Congregation. He is buried in Richmond Hebrew Cemetery along with more than sixty other family members.

Alice Hanauer Strauss lived until 2004, when she died at age 101 in Brandy Station.

== Legacy ==
The Oppenheimer matter quickly became a cause célèbre, with Strauss frequently being cast in the role of villain. This was an image that would persist in both the near term and the long term. Strauss had his defenders as well, who saw the hero and villain roles as being reversed. Such polarized assessments followed Strauss for much of his career.

Even such matters as the unusual, Southern-based pronunciation of his surname could be perceived as a puzzling artificiality. In a 1997 essay in the New York Times Book Review commenting on the Oppenheimer matter, literary critic Alfred Kazin claimed Strauss "pronounced his own name 'Straws' to make himself sound less Jewish". Strauss, however, had been prominent in Jewish causes and organizations throughout his life, and this charge was implausible. Indeed, Strauss's papers take up seventy-six boxes in the archives of the American Jewish Historical Society; the executive director of that organization has remarked that, "I'm not gonna say he is a member of more Jewish organizations than any historical figure I've ever seen, but he's up there."

Strauss's personality was not simply categorized; a mid-1950s interviewer, political scientist Warner R. Schilling, found him bland and courteous in one session but prickly and temperamental in a second session. As Alden Whitman's front-page obituary of Strauss for the New York Times stated,

For about a dozen years at the outset of the atomic age Lewis Strauss, an urbane but sometimes thorny former banker with a gifted amateur's knowledge of physics, was a key figure in the shaping of United States thermonuclear policy. ... In the years of his mightiest influence in Washington, the owlish‐faced Mr. Strauss puzzled most observers. He was, on the one hand, a sociable person who enjoyed dinner parties and who was adept at prestidigitation; and, on the other hand, he gave the impression of intellectual arrogance. He could be warm-hearted yet seem at times like a stuffed shirt. He could make friends yet create antagonisms.

At the start of his 1962 memoir, Strauss states his belief that "the right to live in the social order established [at the American founding] is so priceless a privilege that no sacrifice to preserve it is too great." This sentiment became the basis of the title of, and the interpretative framework for, No Sacrifice Too Great, historian Richard Pfau's 1984 authorized biography of Strauss. In it, Pfau criticizes Strauss's conduct in the Oppenheimer affair, but presents it as the acts of a man with integrity who felt compelled to do what was necessary to protect the nation. Historian Barton J. Bernstein disagrees with this approach, saying that the framework is too generous and that Pfau errs in "seeing Strauss as a man of great integrity (Strauss's own claim) rather than as a man who used such claims to conceal sleazy behavior."

Decades after his death, historians continue to examine Strauss's records and actions. Scholar of the early Cold War period Ken Young studied the historiography of H-bomb development and scrutinized the role that Strauss played in trying to form that history to his benefit. In particular, Young looked at the publication during 1953 and 1954 of a popular magazine article and book that promoted a highly distorted notion that the hydrogen bomb project had been unreasonably stalled, both before Truman's decision and after, by a small group of American scientists working against the national interest; also that Strauss was one of the heroes who had overcome this cabal's efforts. Young points to circumstantial archival evidence that Strauss was behind both publications and may well have given classified information to the book authors involved (James R. Shepley and Clay Blair Jr.). Historian Priscilla Johnson McMillan has identified archival evidence which suggests to some degree that Strauss was in collusion with Borden, the former congressional staff member whose letter had triggered the Oppenheimer security hearing. McMillan also argues that following that letter, Strauss was likely behind Eisenhower's "blank wall" directive to separate Oppenheimer from nuclear secrets.

Oppenheimer biographers Kai Bird and Martin J. Sherwin state that Strauss's decision to publish the transcript of the Oppenheimer security hearing even though witnesses had been promised their testimony would remain secret, rebounded against him in the long run, as the transcript showed how the hearing had taken the form of an inquisition.

In 2023, Bernstein stated that evidence developed in the prior two decades that Oppenheimer had been a secret member of the Communist Party partially vindicated Strauss. "Strauss was devious, thin-skinned, mean-spirited, and even vicious in helping to do in Robert Oppenheimer. But on some important matters—in even somewhat suspecting Oppenheimer’s political past—Strauss was not unreasonable."

== Awards and honors ==
For his European relief work during and after World War I, Strauss was decorated by six nations. These honors included the Chevalier, Belgian Order of Leopold I, the First Class Commander of the White Rose of Finland, and the Chevalier, Star of Roumania. He received a similar medal from Poland. Per a biographical account presented in the Congressional Record, he was also awarded the Grand Officer level of the Legion of Honour of France.

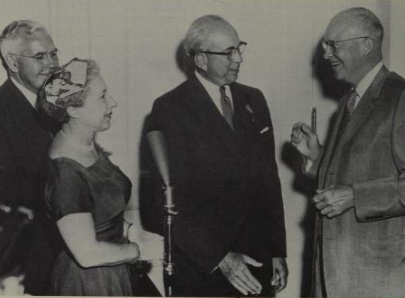
Strauss receiving the Medal of Freedom from President Eisenhower in 1958, with his wife Alice by his side

Strauss, then with the rank of captain, was awarded a Legion of Merit by the Navy in September 1944 for his work on Navy requirements regarding contract termination and disposal of surplus property. At the war's end he received an Oak Leaf Cluster—Army in lieu of a second such award, for his work in coordinating procurement processes. A Gold Star—Navy in lieu of a third award was given in 1947, for his work during and after the war as a special assistant to the Navy secretary and on joint Army–Navy industrial mobilization boards. Finally in 1959 he received a Gold Star in lieu of a fourth award, this time for his work on atomic energy as it benefited the Navy as a source of power and ship propulsion. He also received the Navy Distinguished Service Medal. On July 14, 1958, Strauss was presented with the Medal of Freedom, a civilian honor, by President Eisenhower. The award was for "exceptional meritorious service" in the interest of the national security in his efforts towards both military and peaceful uses of nuclear energy.

Strauss received a number of honorary degrees during his lifetime; indeed his advocates during the Secretary of Commerce confirmation hearings gave twenty-three as the number of colleges and universities that had awarded him such honors. These include, among others, an Honorary LL.D. from the Jewish Theological Seminary of America in 1944, a Doctor of Humane Letters from Case Institute of Technology in 1948, a Doctor of Laws from Carnegie Institute of Technology in 1956, a Doctor of Science from the University of Toledo in 1957, and a Doctor of Science from Union College in 1958.

Strauss served on boards of directors for several corporations, one of which was the United States Rubber Company. He was a trustee of the Hampton Institute, a historically black university in Virginia, as well as of the Memorial Hospital for the Treatment of Cancer and Allied Diseases in New York. Due to donations made to the Medical College of Virginia, a research building there was named after him. He was a founding trustee of Eisenhower College, for which he had assisted in planning and raising funds. In 1955, Strauss received a silver plaque from the Men's Club of Temple Emanu-El for "distinguished service"; President Eisenhower sent a message to the ceremony saying the honor was well-deserved.

The cover of Time magazine featured Strauss twice. The first was in 1953 when he was AEC chair and the nuclear arms race was underway, and the second was in 1959 during his Secretary of Commerce confirmation process.

== In media ==
Strauss is played by Phil Brown in the 1980 BBC miniseries Oppenheimer, and by Robert Downey Jr. in Christopher Nolan's 2023 film Oppenheimer. Downey received the Academy Award for Best Supporting Actor for his portrayal.

== See also ==
- Unsuccessful nominations to the Cabinet of the United States

== Writings ==
- Strauss, Lewis L. Men and Decisions (Garden City, New York: Doubleday & Company, 1962).

== Bibliography ==
- Baker, Richard Allan (Spring 1987). "A Slap at the 'Hidden-Hand Presidency': The Senate and the Lewis Strauss Affair". Congress & the Presidency. 14 (1): 1–16. doi:10.1080/07343468709507964.
- Bernstein, Barton J. (Spring 1986). "Sacrifices and Decisions: Lewis L. Strauss". The Public Historian. 8 (2): 105–120. doi:10.2307/3377436. JSTOR 3377436.
- Bird, Kai; Sherwin, Martin J. (2005). American Prometheus: The Triumph and Tragedy of J. Robert Oppenheimer. New York: Alfred A. Knopf. ISBN 978-0-375-41202-8. OCLC 56753298.
- Bundy, McGeorge (1988). Danger and Survival: Choices About the Bomb in the First Fifty Years. New York: Random House. ISBN 0-394-52278-8.
- Feingold, Henry L. (1970). The Politics of Rescue: The Roosevelt Administration and the Holocaust, 1938–1945. New Brunswick, New Jersey: Rutgers University Press. ISBN 978-0-8135-0664-7.
- Hewlett, Richard G.; Holl, Jack M. (1989). Atoms for Peace and War, 1953–1961 Eisenhower and the Atomic Energy Commission (PDF). A History of the United States Atomic Energy Commission. University Park, Pennsylvania: Pennsylvania State University Press. ISBN 0-520-06018-0. OCLC 82275622.
- Holloway, David (1994). Stalin and the Bomb: The Soviet Union and Atomic Energy, 1939–1956. New Haven, Connecticut: Yale University Press. ISBN 0-300-06056-4.
- McMillan, Priscilla Johnson (2005). The Ruin of J. Robert Oppenheimer and the Birth of the Modern Arms Race. New York: Viking. ISBN 0-670-03422-3. OCLC 57342111.
- Maddock, Shane (Summer 1998). "The Fourth Country Problem: Eisenhower's Nuclear Nonproliferation Policy". Presidential Studies Quarterly. 28 (3): 553–572. JSTOR 27551901.
- Makhijani, Arjun; Schwartz, Stephen I. (1998). "Victims of the Bomb". In Schwartz, Stephen I. (ed.). Atomic Audit: The Costs and Consequences of U.S. Nuclear Weapons since 1940. Washington, D.C.: Brookings Institution Press. pp. 395–432. ISBN 0-8157-7773-6.
- Pfau, Richard (1984). No Sacrifice Too Great: The Life of Lewis L. Strauss. Charlottesville, Virginia: University Press of Virginia. ISBN 978-0-8139-1038-3.
- Rhodes, Richard (1986). The Making of the Atomic Bomb. New York: Simon and Schuster. ISBN 0-671-44133-7.
- Rhodes, Richard (1995). Dark Sun: The Making of the Hydrogen Bomb. New York: Simon and Schuster. ISBN 0-684-80400-X.
- Rowland, Buford; Boyd, William B. (1953). U. S. Navy Bureau of Ordnance in World War II. Washington, D.C.: U.S. Government Printing Office.
- Stern, Philip M. (1969). The Oppenheimer Case. New York: Harper & Row.
- Wentling, Sonja P. (September 2000). "'The Engineer and the Shtadlanim': Herbert Hoover and American Jewish non-Zionists, 1917–28". American Jewish History. 88 (3): 377–406. doi:10.1353/ajh.2000.0058. JSTOR 23886392. S2CID 161722695.
- Young, Ken (2013). "The Hydrogen Bomb, Lewis L. Strauss and the Writing of Nuclear History". Journal of Strategic Studies. 36 (6): 815–840. doi:10.1080/01402390.2012.726924. S2CID 154257639.
- Young, Ken (2016). The American bomb in Britain: US Air Forces' strategic presence, 1946–64. Manchester: Manchester University Press. ISBN 978-0-7190-8675-5.
- Young, Ken; Schilling, Warner R. (2019). Super Bomb: Organizational Conflict and the Development of the Hydrogen Bomb. Ithaca, New York: Cornell University Press. ISBN 978-1-5017-4516-4.

Political offices
Preceded by Gordon Dean	Chair of the Atomic Energy Commission; 1953–1958	Succeeded by John A. McCone
Preceded by Sinclair Weeks	United States Secretary of Commerce; Acting; 1958–1959	Succeeded by Frederick Mueller
