= Barton Bernstein =

American historian (born 1936)

Barton J. Bernstein (born 1936) is Professor emeritus of History at Stanford University and co-chair of the International Relations Program and the International Policy Studies Program. He has published about early Cold War history, as well as about the history of nuclear weapons development and strategy during the 1940s and 1950s.

He received his PhD in history from Harvard University. He is on the board of advisors for the Center on Peace and Liberty at the Independent Institute.

== Works ==
- The Truman Administration: A Documentary History, New York, Harper & Row, 1966
- Towards a New Past: Dissenting Essays in American History, New York, Pantheon Books, 1968
- Twentieth-Century America: Recent Interpretations, New York: Harcourt, 1969
- Politics and Policies of the Truman Administration, Quadrangle Books, 1970
