= Too cheap to meter =

Slogan for plentiful services

"Too cheap to meter" is a slogan first attributed to nuclear power.

Too cheap to meter refers to a commodity so inexpensive that it is cheaper and less bureaucratic to simply provide it for a flat fee or even free and make a profit from associated services. Originally applied to nuclear power, the phrase is also used for services that can be provided at such low cost that the additional cost of itemized billing would outweigh the benefits.

== Origins ==
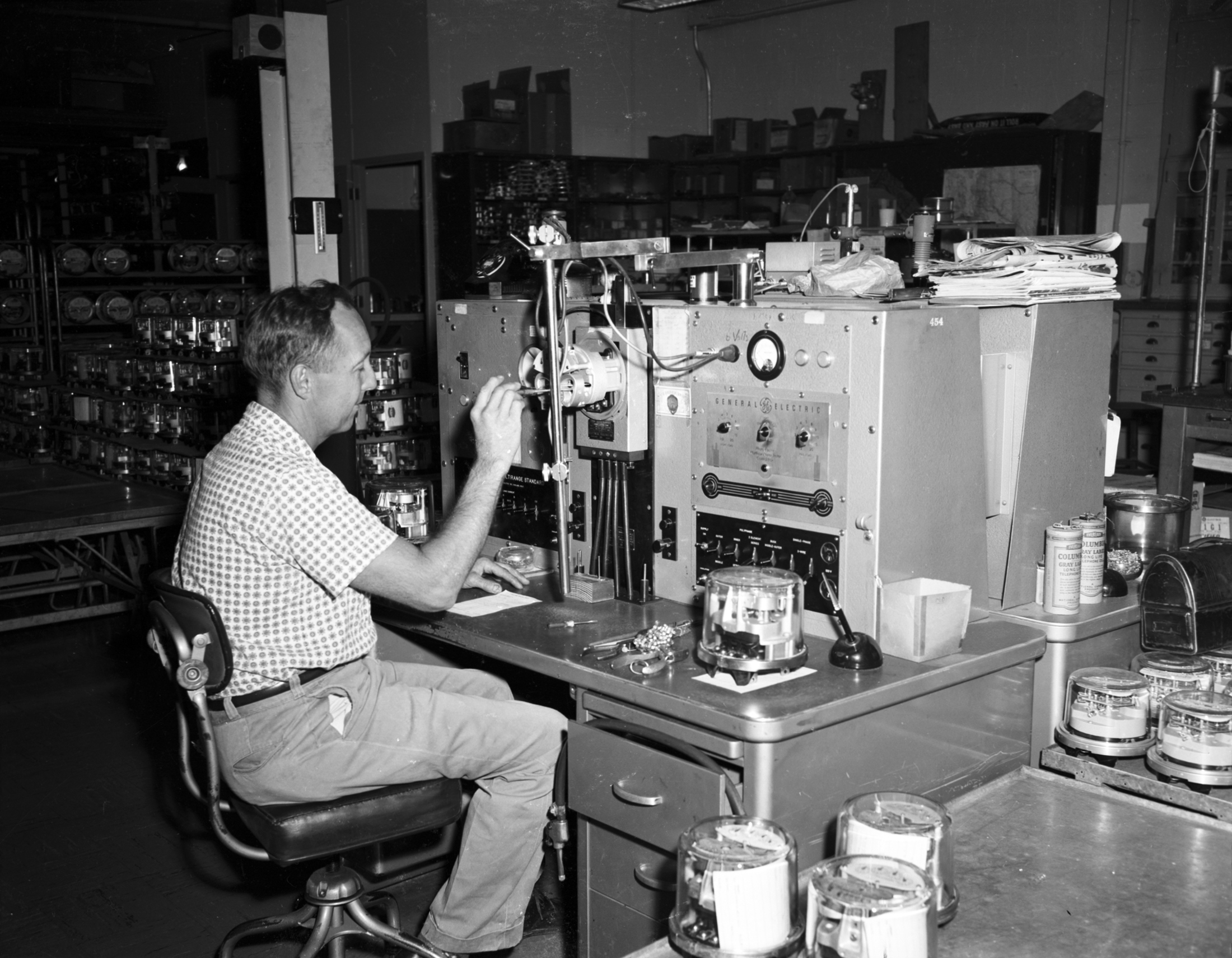
Seattle City Light Meter Division employee testing equipment, 1961

The phrase was coined by Lewis Strauss, then chairman of the United States Atomic Energy Commission, who, in a 1954 speech to the National Association of Science Writers, said:

It is not too much to expect that our children will enjoy in their homes electrical energy too cheap to meter, will know of great periodic regional famines in the world only as matters of history, will travel effortlessly over the seas and under them and through the air with a minimum of danger and at great speeds, and will experience a lifespan far longer than ours, as disease yields and man comes to understand what causes him to age.

It was this statement that caught the eye of most reviewers and was the headline in a New York Times article covering the speech, subtitled "It will be too cheap for our children to meter, Strauss tells science writers." Only a few days later, Strauss was a guest on Meet the Press. When the reporters asked him about the quotation and the viability of "commercial power from atomic piles," Strauss replied that he expected his children and grandchildren would have power "too cheap to be metered, just as we have water today that's too cheap to be metered."

The statement was contentious from the start. The U.S. Atomic Energy Commission itself, in testimony to the U.S. Congress only months before, lowered the expectations for fission power, projecting only that the costs of reactors could be brought down to about the same as those for conventional sources. A later survey found dozens of statements from the period that suggested it was widely believed that nuclear energy would be more expensive than coal, at least in the foreseeable future. James T. Ramey, who would later become an AEC Commissioner, noted: "Nobody took Strauss' statement very seriously."

The phrase has also been attributed to Walter Marshall, a pioneer of nuclear power in the United Kingdom. There is no documentary evidence that he invented or used the term.

== Fusion or fission? ==
Strauss's prediction did not come true, and over time it became a target of those pointing to the industry's record of overpromising and underdelivering — which is now largely realized to have been caused by the transition from the AEC position as a champion of nuclear power to the NRC position of a regulator focused exclusively on regulation; only three reactors have been commissioned in the United States since that transition.

In 1980, the Atomic Industrial Forum wrote an article quoting his son, Lewis H. Strauss, claiming that he was talking about not nuclear fission but nuclear fusion. He claimed his father was not specific about this in the speech because the AEC's Project Sherwood was still classified at the time, so he was not allowed to refer to this work directly. Since that time, this claim has been widely repeated, including in 2003 comments by Donald Hintz, chairman of the Nuclear Energy Institute.

To support that argument, Strauss and biographer Pfau point to this statement: "industry would have electrical power from atomic furnaces in five to fifteen years." It was claimed that the timeline implies that Strauss was referring to fusion, not fission. Although it is not a direct quote, this version of the statement appeared in the New York Times overview of the speech the next day. The statement in question is originally:

Dr. Lawrence Hafstad, whom all of you surely know, happens to be speaking, today, in Brussels before the Congress of Industrial Chemistry. He heads the Reactor Development Division of the Atomic Energy Commission. Therefore, he expects to be asked, "How soon will you have industrial atomic electric power in the United States?" His answer is "from 5 to 15 years depending on the vigor of the development effort."

Hafstad was in charge of the development of fission reactors by the AEC, and this statement immediately precedes the "too cheap to meter" statement. The same is true of his statements on Meet the Press, which in direct reply to a question about fission. The speech as a whole contains large sections about the development of fission power and the difficulties that the Commission was having communicating this fact. He wryly notes receiving letters addressed to the "Atomic Bomb Commission" and then quotes a study that demonstrates the public is largely ignorant of the development of atomic power. He goes on to briefly recount the development of fission, noting a letter from Leo Szilard of sixteen years earlier where he speaks of the possibility of a chain reaction.

A later examination of the topic concluded: "there is no evidence in Strauss's papers at the Herbert Hoover Presidential Library to indicate fusion was the hidden subject of his speech."

Strauss viewed hydrogen fusion as the ultimate power source and was eager to develop the technology as quickly as possible and urged the Project Sherwood researchers to make rapid progress, even suggesting a million-dollar prize to the individual or team that succeeded first. However Strauss was not optimistic about the rapid commercialization of fusion power. In August 1955 after fusion research was made public, he cautioned that "there has been nothing in the nature of breakthroughs that would warrant anyone assuming that this [fusion power] was anything except a very long range—and I would accent the word 'very'—prospect."

== Other uses ==
The phrase became famous enough that it has been used in other contexts, especially in post-scarcity discussions. For instance, landline (and cable) internet bandwidth is now often billed on a flat monthly fee with no usage limits, and it is predicted that the introduction of 5G will do the same for mobile data, making it "too cheap to meter." The same has been said for technology as a whole.

Prior to 1985, water meters were not required in New York City; water and sewage fees were assessed based on building size and number of water fixtures; water metering was introduced as a conservation measure.

== See also ==
- Cornucopianism
- Free public transport

== Sources ==
- Strauss, Lewis (16 September 1954). Remarks prepared by Lewis L. Strauss (PDF) (Technical report). United States Atomic Energy Commission.
- Wellock, Thomas (3 June 2016). "'Too Cheap to Meter', a history of the phrase". NRC Blog.
- Billington, James (2010). Respectfully Quoted: A Dictionary of Quotations. Courier. ISBN 9780486472881.
- "Abundant Power from Atom Seen; It will be too cheap for our children to meter, Strauss tells science writers". New York Times. 17 September 1954. p. 5.
