= James C. Marshall =

US Army general and engineer (1897–1977)

James Creel Marshall
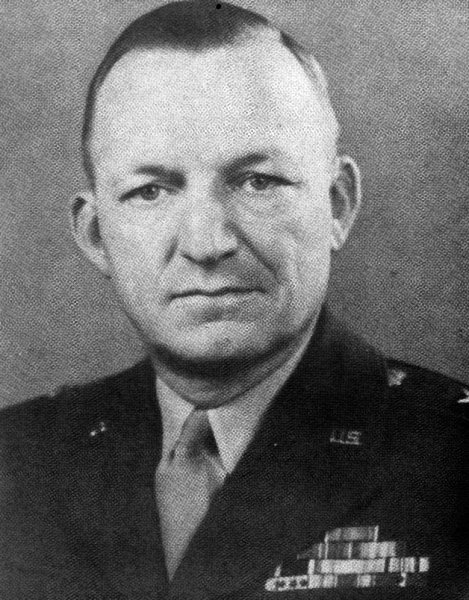
- Born: 15 October 1897; Plattsburg, Missouri, US
- Died: 19 July 1977 (aged 79); Syracuse, New York, US
- Burial place: West Point Cemetery
- Education: United States Military Academy (BS)
- Military career
- Allegiance: United States
- Branch: United States Army
- Service years: 1918–1947
- Rank: Brigadier General
- Service number: 0–9316
- Commands: Binghamton District; Syracuse District; Manhattan District; Boston Port of Embarkation
- Conflicts: World War I; World War II; New Guinea campaign; Philippines Campaign (1944–45)
- Awards: Legion of Merit; Bronze Star Medal; Army Commendation Medal

Brigadier General James Creel Marshall (15 October 1897 – 19 July 1977) was a United States Army Corps of Engineers officer who was initially in charge of the Manhattan Project to build an atomic bomb during World War II.

A member of the June 1918 class of the United States Military Academy at West Point that graduated early due to World War I, Marshall saw service on the Mexican border. Between the wars he worked on engineering projects in the United States and the Panama Canal Zone. In January 1942, shortly after the United States entered World War II, he became District Engineer of the Syracuse District, and oversaw the construction of the Rome Air Depot.

In June 1942, Marshall was placed in charge of the Manhattan Project, then known as the Laboratory Development of Substitute Materials. Although superseded as head of the project by Brigadier General Leslie R. Groves Jr., in September, he was Manhattan District engineer from 13 August 1942 to 13 August 1943. In November 1943 he became Assistant Chief of Staff (G-4) of the United States Army Services of Supply (USASOS) in the Southwest Pacific Area, serving in Australia, New Guinea and the Philippines.

Marshall left the Army in 1947, and moved to Riverside, Connecticut, where he worked for M. W. Kellogg Co. He later joined Koppers, building a coal loading facility in Turkey, and worked on mining projects in Africa. He was Commissioner of Highways in Minnesota from 1961 to 1965.

== Early life and career ==
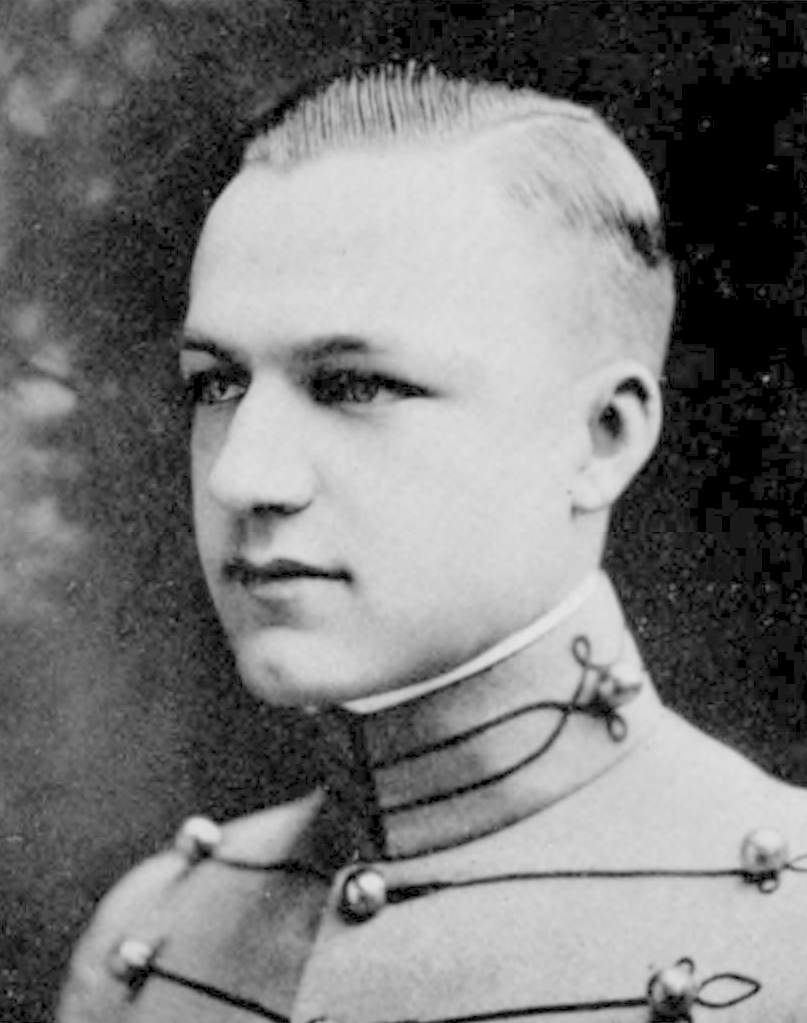
At West Point in 1918

James Creel Marshall was born in Plattsburg, Missouri, on 14 October 1897, the son of Walter Scott Marshall and his wife Cora Sutphen née Creel. He was appointed to the United States Military Academy at West Point in 1915. His classmates included Hugh John Casey, Lucius D. Clay, William M. Miley and Edwin L. Sibert. The entire class graduated early on 12 June 1918 due to World War I, and Marshall, who was ranked 24th in the class, was commissioned as a substantive first lieutenant and temporary captain in the United States Army Corps of Engineers. He was posted to Camp A. A. Humphreys from 8 to 15 July 1918, and then was sent to the Engineer Officers' Training School at Camp Lee, Virginia, for additional training. While there, he married Mabel Estelle Wolff from Brooklyn. They had two children, Beryl, born in 1919, and Robert Creel, born in 1921.

On 24 August 1918, Marshall joined the 8th Engineers at Fort Bliss, Texas. He returned to Camp A. A. Humphreys as a student officer from 10 February 1919 to 12 June 1919. Young officers like Marshall who had not served overseas during the war were sent on battlefield tours. From 20 June to 30 August 1919, he toured the battlefields of World War I, visiting Britain, France, Belgium and Germany, before returning to Camp A. A. Humphreys on 10 September 1919. After service at Camp A. A. Humphreys with the Reserve Officers' Training Corps, Marshall was posted to the 13th Engineers as its adjutant on 10 February 1921, but attended the Engineer School Basic Course from 6 June 1921, graduating on 15 August 1921, after which he became an instructor there. On 25 June 1922 he became Assistant District Engineer of the 2nd District, based in New York City.

Like many of his fellow officers, Marshall was reduced to his substantive rank of first lieutenant on 18 November 1922. On 4 August 1923 he took charge of the Engineer Office of the 3rd New York District, located in Fort Hancock, New Jersey. He then served in the Panama Canal Zone as a company commander in the 11th Engineers from 9 April 1926 to 14 June 1928. He became an instructor in the Department of Engineering at West Point on 24 August 1928. He was posted to Fort Belvoir, Virginia, on 10 August 1932, where he was promoted to captain again on 1 June 1933. There followed duty in the Office of the Chief Of Engineers in Washington, DC, as Assistant Chief of the River and Harbor Section from 21 January 1937 to 3 September 1939.

== World War II ==
Marshall attended the U.S. Army Command and General Staff College at Fort Leavenworth, Kansas, from 11 September 1939 to 3 February 1940. He then became executive officer of the 1st Engineers. With the outbreak of World War II in Europe, promotion accelerated, and he was promoted to major on 1 March 1940. He became District Engineer of the Binghamton District on 25 May 1940, with the rank of lieutenant colonel in the Army of the United States from 12 June 1941. On 31 January 1942, he became District Engineer of the Syracuse District, which covered New York and part of Pennsylvania, with the rank of colonel from 1 February 1942. At Binghamton and Syracuse was responsible for a number of major projects, including ammunition and explosive plants, and the construction of the Rome Air Depot. He also had to attend to flood control measures on the upper Delaware River.

On 18 June 1942 Marshall was called to Washington to take over the reorganized atomic bomb project, then known as the DSM (Laboratory Development of Substitute Materials). Marshall read the 13 June 1942 report from Vannevar Bush and James Conant and recalled that:

I spent the night without sleep trying to figure out what this was all about. I had never heard of nuclear fission, but I did know that you could not build much of a plant, much less four of them, for ninety million dollars. At the moment among other construction projects in the Syracuse district, I had one for a TNT plant in Pennsylvania estimated to cost one hundred twenty eight million dollars.

In a report to Colonel Leslie Groves, the head of the Construction Branch in the Office of the Chief of Engineers, on 11 August 1942, Marshall called for the creation a new district without territorial limits to administer the DSM project. His proposal was approved on 13 August. As district engineer of the new district, Marshall reported directly to Groves, and not the Chief of Engineers. He established the district headquarters on the 18th floor of 270 Broadway in New York City, with the innocuous name of the Manhattan Engineer District, following the usual practice of naming engineer districts after the city in which their headquarters area were located. He selected the Boston firm of Stone & Webster as the project's principal contractor.

Marshall and his deputy district engineer, Kenneth Nichols, visited Tennessee on 30 June 1942 to examine the proposed location for the production plants in the Clinch River area, but Marshall chose to delay the actual purchase of the land until it was needed. Nichols felt that Marshall's desire for orderly procedures ultimately told against him. By September, Bush was expressing dissatisfaction with slow progress and the lack of the highest priority for the project, going to the United States Secretary of War, Henry L. Stimson, and then directly to the President, Franklin D. Roosevelt. Groves was appointed to head the project on 17 September 1942. Groves was also a colonel, and ranked below Marshall on the permanent list, although Groves was promoted to brigadier general before assuming command on 23 September. According to Nichols, Groves and Marshall "disagreed in a major way on how to handle personnel", and Nichols "did witness several confrontations".

Major General Wilhelm D. Styer, the Chief of Staff of the Army Service Forces, decided that Marshall would be replaced by Nichols. Marshall would be replaced given an overseas posting. He was informed by Nichols on June; to him it seemed he was "getting fired", although he had previously expressed a desire to Groves for just such an overseas assignment. Indeed, when first assigned to the project, both Nichols and Groves had also have expressed a preference for an overseas combat assignment. Nichols had "liked working for him and was happy to have him as a buffer between Groves and myself", because Groves was "abrasive and often very critical". Marshall asked Nichols to transfer his secretary, Virginia Olsson, to Oak Ridge when the Manhattan District headquarters moved there, leaving Nichols's own secretary, Anne Phillips, in the New York office. "This concern for personnel", Nichols noted, "was typical of Marshall". Since the Manhattan District had been officially created on 13 August 1942, Marshall chose to formally leave on 13 August 1943, so that he had held the job for exactly one year.

Groves's account says that:

shortly after, Nichols replaced Marshall as District Engineer ... the Chief of Engineers asked me if I could relieve Marshall for a key overseas assignment, which would mean his promotion to brigadier. Since the project was by that time well organized, I did not feel I should refuse, and appointed Nichols in his stead. This was an excellent choice and one I have never regretted.

Marshall was awarded the Legion of Merit, "for exceptionally meritorious conduct in the performance of outstanding services", in conjunction with his service with the Manhattan Project. He was posted to Camp Sutton, North Carolina, as commander of the Engineer Replacement Training Center there until 26 November 1943. He then had his sought-after overseas service, in the Southwest Pacific Area, where he became Assistant Chief of Staff (G-4) of the United States Army Services of Supply (USASOS). He saw service in Australia, New Guinea and the Philippines. He was promoted to brigadier general on 10 November 1944, and awarded the Bronze Star Medal. He returned to the United States for medical reasons on 12 February 1945. His final command was of the Boston Port of Embarkation, for which he received the Army Commendation Medal. On 29 January 1946 he became head of the Engineer Research and Development Laboratory at Fort Belvoir. He reverted to his permanent rank of colonel on 5 March 1946, and retired from the Army on a disability on 31 March 1947. On 29 June 1948, he was promoted to brigadier general on the retired list.

== Later life ==
After leaving the Army, he moved to Riverside, Connecticut, where he worked for M. W. Kellogg Co. He eventually tired of commuting to New York City, and took a job with Koppers, building a coal loading facility in Turkey. He then worked for the United Nations Korean Relief at the headquarters of the United Nations in New York. He was also involved in mining projects in Africa. He made his home in Skaneateles, New York, while working on various projects around the world. In January 1961 he accepted an offer from the Governor of Minnesota, Elmer L. Andersen, to become that state's Commissioner of Highways. His four-year term was marred by a change of government in the state in 1963, and his final years saw a series of clashes with the new governor, Karl F. Rolvaag, and his attorney-general Walter Mondale.

When his term as Commissioner of Highways ended in 1965, Marshall returned to Skaneateles, where he became an engineering consultant and a professional engineering arbitrator. He served as mayor of Skaneateles for six years. His contributions included the addition of an ambulance squad to the fire department and the construction of an indoor ice skating rink. His wife Mabel died of cancer in 1976. On 19 July 1977, Marshall also died from cancer. The two are buried together in the West Point Cemetery.

Marshall's son Robert Creel Marshall graduated from West Point with the class of 1943, and served in Europe during World War II. He later served in Vietnam, and became Deputy Chief of Engineers in 1976, with the rank of major general.
