= Dixon–Yates contract =

1954 US AEC contract with private energy companies

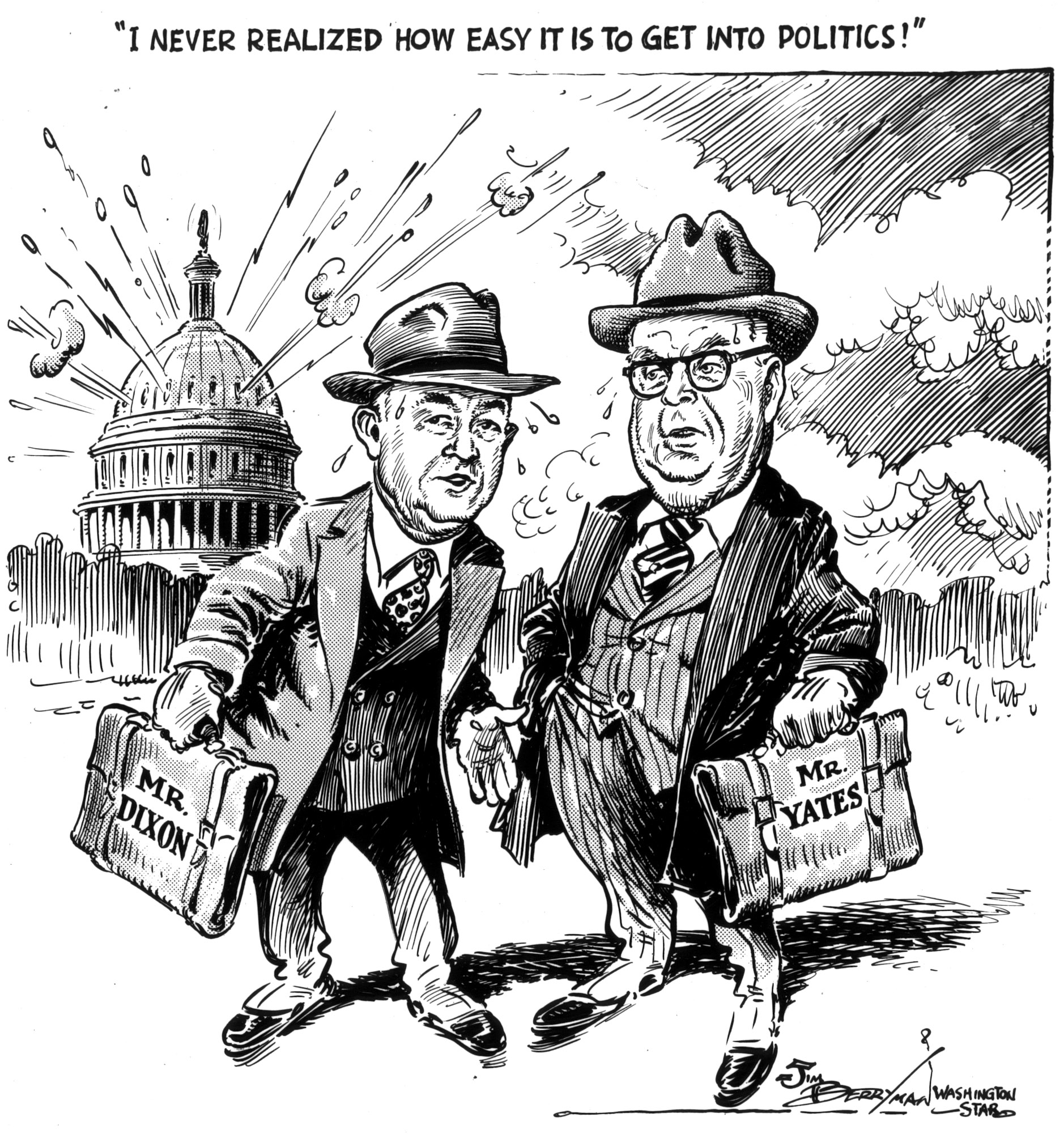
Cartoon by James T. Berryman

The Dixon–Yates contract was a 1954 contract between the United States Atomic Energy Commission (AEC) and two private energy companies, Middle South Utilities and the Southern Company, to supply 600,000 kilowatts of power to the AEC for their Tennessee plant. The power would replace power from the Tennessee Valley Authority (TVA), which could be used instead for the growing power demand of the city of Memphis. The TVA had asked for federal funds to build additional generating capacity for Memphis, but President Dwight D. Eisenhower opposed using taxes to provide tax-free low-interest financing to benefit one metropolitan area.

The contract, actually with the Mississippi Valley Generating Company to build a coal plant, was named after its two signatories: Edgar Dixon, the President of Middle South Utilities, and Eugene Yates the chairman of the Board of the Southern Company. Kenneth Nichols, AEC general manager, told AEC Chairman Lewis Strauss that replacing the power the TVA was contracted to supply would cost an extra four to six million a year, and that he preferred that the TVA procure the power directly. However, Strauss and Eisenhower favoured the proposal, which was approved by the Joint Committee on Atomic Energy (JCAE) when it was still controlled by Republicans.

However, in the 1954 Congressional elections, the Democrats, who had made an issue of Dixon–Yates, won control of the House and Senate and in 1955 they gained chairmanship and majority control of the JCAE. The new chairman, Senator Clinton Anderson, reopened the Dixon–Yates hearings to force the AEC to cancel the contract. Most of the issues between the TVA and the AEC were resolved while Nichols was general manager, but under a plan developed by Walter von Tresckow, a New York financial consultant, eventually the city of Memphis came up with an alternative solution to its power needs and the contract was cancelled. Dixon–Yates claimed damages, but lost because of a conflict of interest involving a Bureau of the Budget consultant. Nichols said that "The AEC was absolved of any involvement in the conflict of interest. Thus ended a time-consuming political fiasco."
