= Leslie Groves =

American military officer (1896–1970)

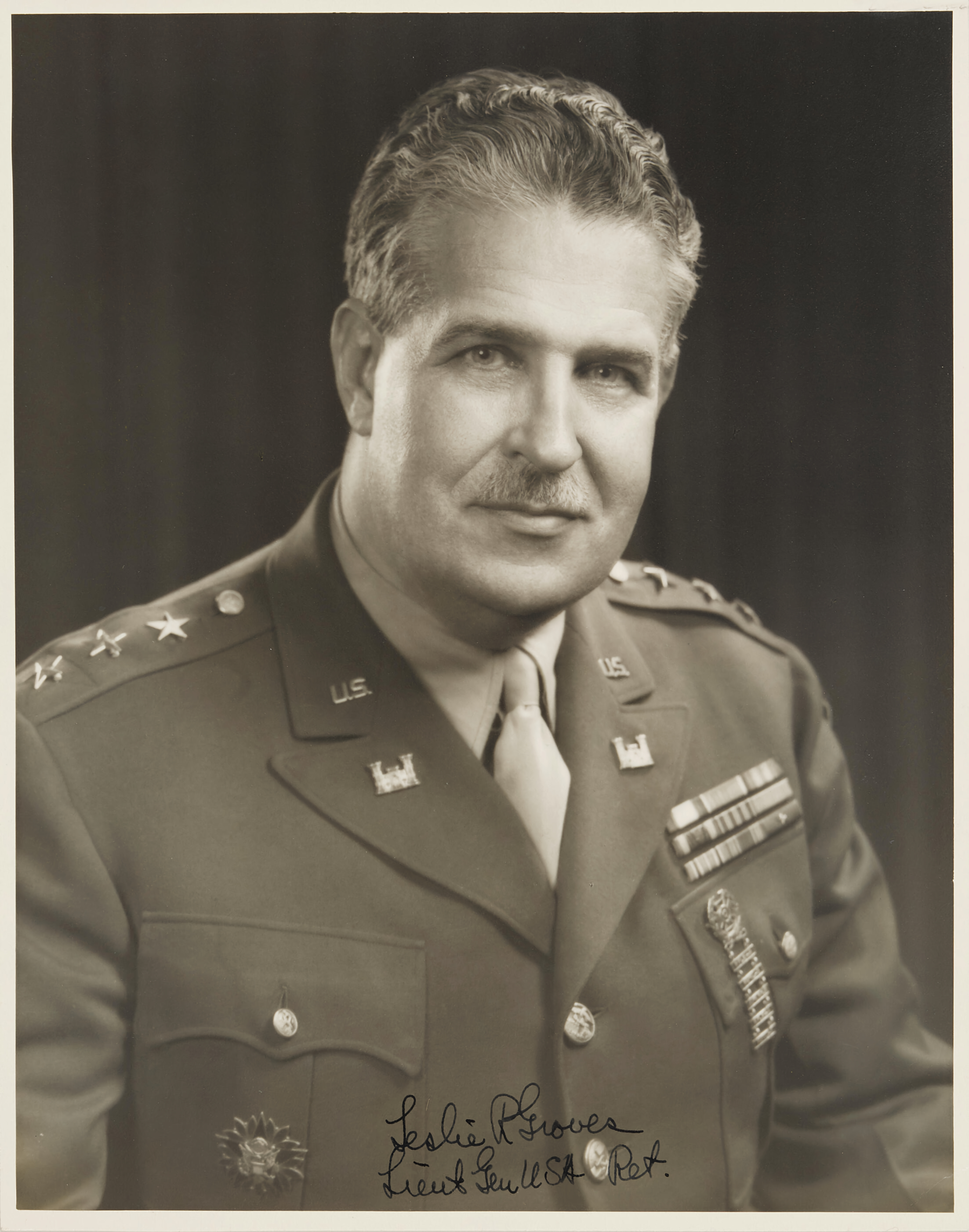
- Groves in 1948
- Born: Leslie Richard Groves Jr. 17 August 1896; Albany, New York, U.S.
- Died: 13 July 1970 (aged 73); Washington, D.C., U.S.
- Burial place: Arlington National Cemetery, Virginia, U.S.
- Education: United States Military Academy (BS)
- Military career
- Allegiance: United States
- Branch: United States Army
- Service years: 1918–1948
- Rank: Lieutenant General
- Unit: Corps of Engineers
- Commands: Armed Forces Special Weapons Project; Manhattan Project
- Conflicts: World War I; Banana Wars; Occupation of Nicaragua; World War II
- Awards: Army Distinguished Service Medal; Legion of Merit; Order of the Crown (Belgium); Companion of the Order of the Bath (United Kingdom); Medal of Merit (Nicaragua)

Signature
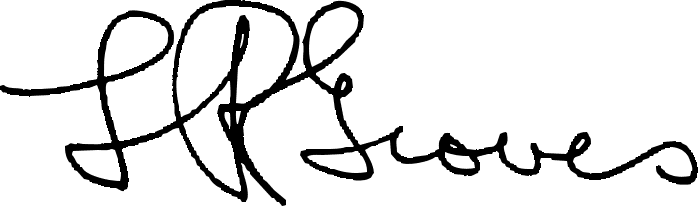

Leslie Richard Groves Jr. (17 August 1896 – 13 July 1970) was a United States Army Corps of Engineers officer. He oversaw the construction of the Pentagon and directed the Manhattan Project, the top secret research program that developed the atomic bomb during World War II, leading to the atomic bombings of Hiroshima and Nagasaki in 1945.

The son of a U.S. Army chaplain, Groves lived at various Army posts during his childhood. In 1918, he graduated fourth in his class at the United States Military Academy at West Point and was commissioned into the United States Army Corps of Engineers. In 1929, he went to Nicaragua as part of an expedition to conduct a survey for the Inter-Oceanic Nicaragua Canal. Following the 1931 Nicaraguan earthquake, Groves took over Managua's water supply system, for which he was awarded the Nicaraguan Presidential Medal of Merit. He attended the Command and General Staff School at Fort Leavenworth, Kansas, in 1935 and 1936, and the Army War College in 1938 and 1939, after which he was posted to the War Department General Staff. Groves developed "a reputation as a doer, a driver, and a stickler for duty". In 1940 he became special assistant for construction to the Quartermaster General, tasked with inspecting construction sites and checking on their progress. In August 1941, he was appointed to create the gigantic office complex for the War Department's 40,000 staff that would ultimately become the Pentagon.

In September 1942, Groves took charge of the Manhattan Project. He was involved in most aspects of the atomic bomb's development: he participated in the selection of sites for research and production at Oak Ridge, Tennessee; Los Alamos, New Mexico; and Hanford, Washington. He directed the enormous construction effort, made critical decisions on the various methods of isotope separation, acquired raw materials, directed the collection of military intelligence on the German nuclear energy project and helped select the cities in Japan that were chosen as targets. Groves wrapped the Manhattan Project in security, but spies working within the project were able to pass some of its most important secrets to the Soviet Union.

After the war, Groves remained in charge of the Manhattan Project until responsibility for nuclear weapons production was handed over to the United States Atomic Energy Commission in 1947. He then headed the Armed Forces Special Weapons Project, which had been created to control the military aspects of nuclear weapons. He was given a dressing down by the Chief of Staff of the Army, General of the Army Dwight D. Eisenhower, on the basis of various complaints, and told that he would never be appointed Chief of Engineers. Three days later, Groves announced his intention to leave the Army. He was promoted to lieutenant general just before his retirement on 29 February 1948 in recognition of his leadership of the bomb program. By a special act of Congress, his date of rank was backdated to 16 July 1945, the date of the Trinity nuclear test. He went on to become a vice president at Sperry Rand.

== Early life ==
Leslie Richard Groves Jr. was born in Albany, New York, on 17 August 1896, the third son of four children of a pastor, Leslie Richard Groves Sr., and his wife Gwen née Griffith. He was half Welsh and half English, with some French Huguenot ancestors who came to the United States in the 17th century. Leslie Groves Sr. resigned as pastor of the Sixth Presbyterian church in Albany in December 1896 to become a United States Army chaplain. He was posted to the 14th Infantry at Vancouver Barracks in Washington state in 1897.

Following the outbreak of the Spanish–American War in 1898, Chaplain Groves was sent to Cuba with the 8th Infantry. On returning to Vancouver Barracks, he was ordered to rejoin the 14th Infantry in the Philippines. Service in the Philippine–American War and the Boxer Rebellion followed. The 14th Infantry returned to the United States in 1901 and moved to Fort Snelling, Minnesota. The family relocated there from Vancouver, then moved to Fort Hancock, New Jersey, and returned to Vancouver in 1905. Chaplain Groves was hospitalized with tuberculosis at Fort Bayard in 1905. He decided to settle in southern California and bought a house in Altadena. His next posting was to Fort Apache, Arizona. The family spent their summers there and returned to Altadena where the children attended school.

In 1911, Chaplain Groves was ordered to return to the 14th Infantry, which was now stationed at Fort William Henry Harrison, Montana. At Fort Harrison, the younger Groves met Grace (Boo) Wilson, the daughter of Colonel Richard Hulbert Wilson, a career Army officer who had served with Chaplain Groves during the 8th Infantry's posting to Cuba. In 1913, the 14th Infantry moved once more, this time to Fort Lawton in Seattle, Washington.

Groves entered Queen Anne High School in 1913, and graduated in 1914. While completing high school, he enrolled in courses at the University of Washington, in anticipation of attempting to gain an appointment to the United States Military Academy. He earned a nomination from the President, Woodrow Wilson, which allowed him to compete for a vacancy, but did not score a high enough mark on the examination to be admitted. Charles W. Bell from California's 9th congressional district nominated Groves as an alternate, but the principal nominee accepted. Instead, Groves enrolled at the Massachusetts Institute of Technology (MIT) and planned to re-take the West Point entrance exam. In 1916, Groves tested again, attained a passing score, and was accepted. He later said "Entering West Point fulfilled my greatest ambition. I had been brought up in the Army, and in the main had lived on Army posts all my life."

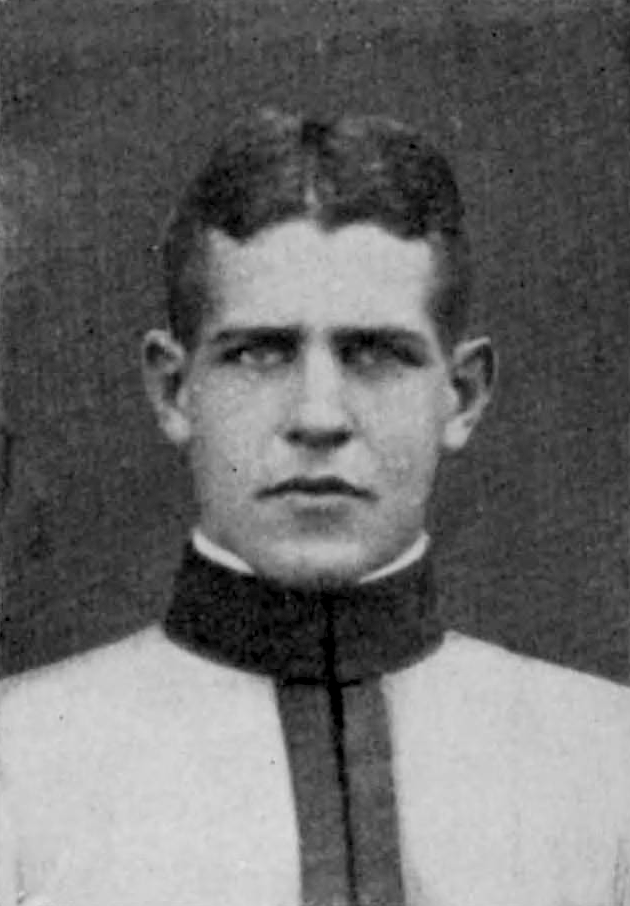
At West Point in 1918

Groves's class entered West Point on 15 June 1916. His nickname at West Point was Greasy. The United States declaration of war on Germany in April 1917 led to their program of instruction being shortened as the War Emergency Course (WEC), which graduated on 1 November 1918, a year and a half ahead of schedule. Groves finished fourth in his class, which earned him a commission as a second lieutenant in the Corps of Engineers, the first choice of most high ranking cadets.

At MIT he had played tennis informally, but at West Point he could not skate for ice hockey, did not like basketball, and was not good enough for baseball or track; football was his only sport. He said that "I was the number two center but was on the bench most of the time as in those days you didn't have substitutes and normally the number one played the whole game. I was not very heavy, and today would be considered too light to play at all".

== Between the wars ==
After the traditional month's leave following graduation from West Point, Groves reported to Camp A. A. Humphreys, Virginia, in December 1918, where he was promoted to first lieutenant on 1 May 1919. He was sent to France in June on an educational tour of the European battlefields of World War I. After returning from Europe, Groves became a student officer at the Engineer School at Camp Humphreys in September 1919. On graduation he was posted to the 7th Engineers at Fort Benning, Georgia, as a company commander.

He returned to Camp Humphreys in February 1921 for the Engineer Basic Officers' Course. On graduation in August 1921, he was posted to the 4th Engineers, stationed at Camp Lewis, Washington. He was then posted to Fort Worden in command of a survey detachment. This was close to Seattle, so he was able to pursue his courtship of Grace Wilson, who had become a kindergarten teacher. They were married in St. Clement's Episcopal Church in Seattle on 10 February 1922. Their marriage produced two children: a son, Richard Hulbert, born in 1923, and a daughter, Gwen, born in 1928.

In November 1922, Groves received his first overseas posting, as a company commander with the 3rd Engineers at the Schofield Barracks in Hawaii. He earned a commendation for his work there, constructing a trail from Kahuku to Pupukea. In November 1925 he was posted to Galveston, Texas, as an assistant to the District Engineer, Major Julian Schley. Groves's duties included opening the channel at Port Isabel and supervising dredging operations in Galveston Bay. In 1927 he became commander of Company D, 1st Engineers, at Fort DuPont, Delaware.

During the New England Flood of November 1927 he was sent to Fort Ethan Allen, Vermont, to assist with a detachment of the 1st Engineers. After a pontoon bridge they constructed was swamped and swept away by the flood waters, Groves was accused of negligence. A month later Groves and several of his men were seriously injured, one fatally, when a block of TNT prematurely detonated. Groves's superior wrote a critical report on him, but the Chief of Engineers, Major General Edgar Jadwin, interceded, attributing blame to Groves's superiors instead. Groves was returned to Fort DuPont.

In 1929, Groves departed for Nicaragua in charge of a company of the 1st Engineers as part of an expedition whose purpose was to conduct a survey for the Inter-Oceanic Nicaragua Canal. Following the 1931 Nicaragua earthquake, Groves took over responsibility for Managua's water supply system, for which he was awarded the Nicaraguan Presidential Medal of Merit. Groves was promoted to captain on 20 October 1934. He attended the Command and General Staff School at Fort Leavenworth, Kansas, in 1935 and 1936, after which he was posted to Kansas City, Missouri, as assistant to the commander of the Missouri River Division. In 1938 and 1939 he attended the Army War College. On 1 July 1939, he was posted to the War Department General Staff in Washington, D.C.

== World War II ==
=== Construction Division ===
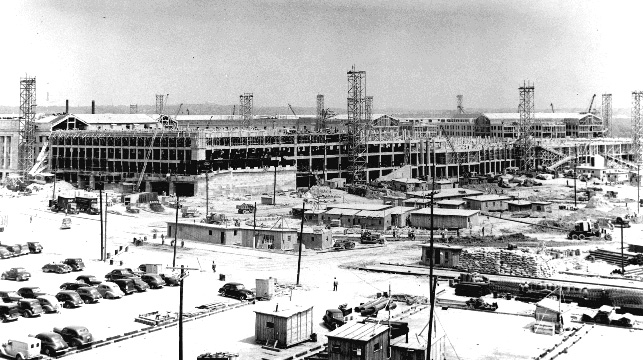
Northwest exposure showing construction of the Pentagon, 1 July 1942

Groves was promoted to major on 1 July 1940. Three weeks later, he became special assistant for construction to the Quartermaster General, Major General Edmund B. Gregory. The two men had known each other a long time, as Groves's father was a close friend of Gregory's. At this point, the US Army was about to embark on a national mobilization, and it was the task of the Construction Division of the Quartermaster Corps to prepare the necessary accommodations and training facilities for the vast army that would be created. The enormous construction program had been dogged by bottlenecks, shortages, delays, spiralling costs, and poor living conditions at the construction sites. Newspapers began publishing accounts charging the Construction Division with incompetence, ineptitude, and inefficiency. Groves, who "had a reputation as a doer, a driver, and a stickler for duty", was one of a number of engineer officers brought in to turn the project around. He was tasked with inspecting construction sites and checking on their progress.

On 12 November 1940, Gregory asked Groves to take over command of the Fixed Fee Branch of the Construction Division as soon as his promotion to colonel came through. Groves assumed his new rank and duties on 14 November 1940. Groves later recalled:

During the first week that I was on duty there, I could not walk out of my office down the corridor to Hartman's office without being literally assailed by the officers or civilian engineers with liaison responsibility for various camps. It is no exaggeration to state that during this period decisions involving up to $5,000,000 [$115,000,000 with inflation] were made at the rate of about one every 100 feet of corridor walked.

First, General Groves is the biggest S.O.B. I have ever worked for. He is most demanding. He is most critical. He is always a driver, never a praiser. He is abrasive and sarcastic. He disregards all normal organizational channels. He is extremely intelligent. He has the guts to make difficult, timely decisions. He is the most egotistical man I know. He knows he is right and so sticks by his decision. He abounds with energy and expects everyone to work as hard or even harder than he does. Although he gave me great responsibility and adequate authority to carry out his mission-type orders, he constantly meddled with my subordinates. However, to compensate for that he had a small staff, which meant that we were not subject to the usual staff-type heckling. He ruthlessly protected the overall project from other government agency interference, which made my task easier. He seldom accepted other agency cooperation and then only on his own terms. During the war and since I have had the opportunity to meet many of our most outstanding leaders in the Army, Navy and Air Force as well as many of our outstanding scientific, engineering and industrial leaders. And in summary, if I had to do my part of the atomic bomb project over again and had the privilege of picking my boss I would pick General Groves.

— Kenneth D. Nichols

Groves instituted a series of reforms. He installed phone lines for the Supervising Construction Quartermasters, demanded weekly reports on progress, ordered that reimbursement vouchers be processed within a week, and sent expediters to sites reporting shortages. He ordered his contractors to hire whatever special equipment they needed and to pay premium prices if necessary to guarantee quick delivery. Instead of allowing construction of camps to proceed in whatever order the contractors saw fit, Groves laid down priorities for completion of camp facilities, so that the troops could begin moving in even while construction was still under way.

By mid-December, the worst of the crisis was over. Over half a million men had been mobilized and essential accommodations and facilities for two million men were 95 per cent complete. Between 1 July 1940 and 10 December 1941, the Construction Division let contracts worth $1,676,293,000 ($36,692,600,000 with inflation), of which $1,347,991,000 ($29,506,400,000 with inflation), or about 80 per cent, were fixed-fee contracts.

On 19 August 1941, Groves was summoned to a meeting with the head of the Construction Division, Brigadier General Brehon B. Somervell. In attendance were Captain Clarence Renshaw, one of Groves's assistants; Major Hugh J. Casey, the chief of the Construction Division's Design and Engineering Section; and George Bergstrom, a former president of the American Institute of Architects. Casey and Bergstrom had designed an enormous office complex to house the War Department's 40,000 staff together in one building, a five-story, five-sided structure, which would ultimately become the Pentagon.

The Pentagon had a total square footage of 5,100,000 square feet (470,000 m^{2}) – twice that of the Empire State Building – making it the largest office building in the world. The estimated cost was $35 million ($766,100,000 with inflation), and Somervell wanted 500,000 square feet (46,000 m^{2}) of floor space available by 1 March 1942. Bergstrom became the architect-engineer with Renshaw in charge of construction, reporting directly to Groves. At its peak the project employed 13,000 persons. By the end of April, the first occupants were moving in and 1,000,000 square feet (93,000 m^{2}) of space was ready by the end of May. In the end, the project cost some $63 million ($1,379,000,000 with inflation).

Groves steadily overcame one crisis after another, dealing with strikes, shortages, competing priorities and engineers who were not up to their tasks. He worked six days a week in his office in Washington, D.C. During the week he would determine which project was in the greatest need of personal attention and pay it a visit on Sunday. Groves later recalled that he was "hoping to get to a war theater so I could find a little peace."

=== Manhattan Project ===
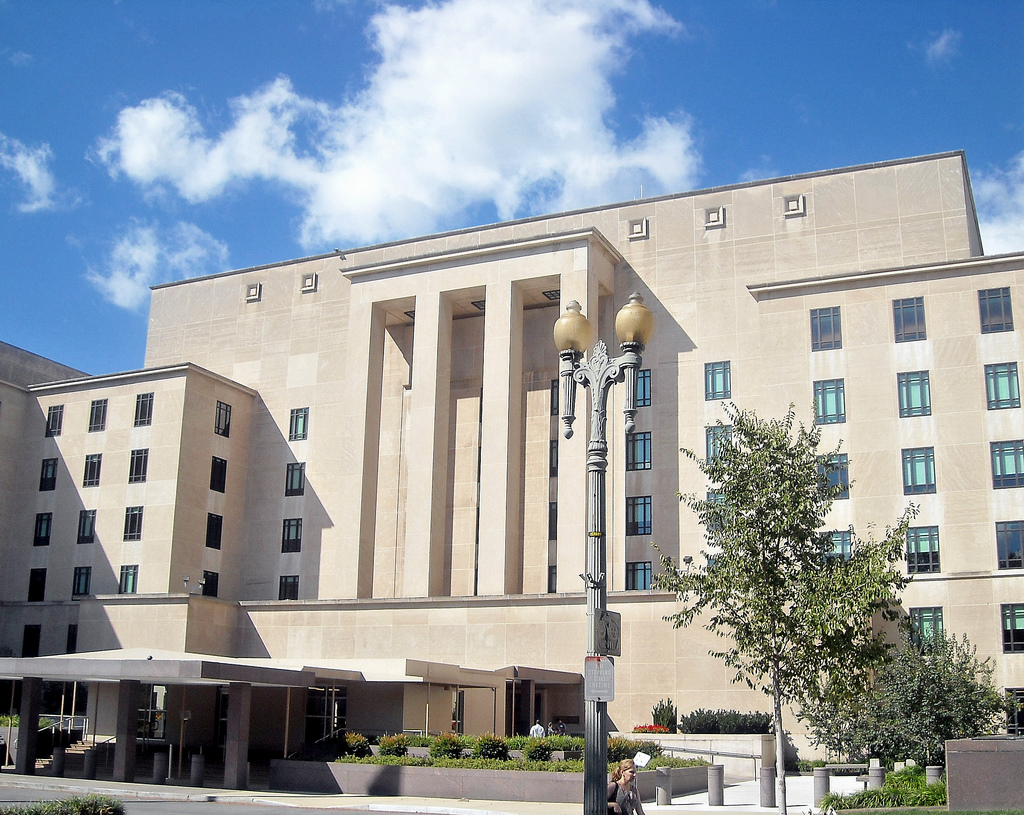
Groves ran the Manhattan Project from the fifth floor of the New War Department Building.

The Manhattan Engineer District (MED) was formally established by the Chief of Engineers, Major General Eugene Reybold on 16 August 1942. The name was chosen by Groves and MED's district engineer, Colonel James C. Marshall. Like other engineer districts, it was named after the city where its headquarters was located, at 270 Broadway. Unlike the others, it had no geographic boundaries, only a mission: to develop an atomic bomb. Marshall had the authority of a division engineer head and reported directly to Reybold.

Although Reybold was satisfied with the progress being made, Vannevar Bush was less so. He felt that aggressive leadership was required, and suggested the appointment of a prestigious officer as overall project director. Somervell, now Chief of Army Service Forces, recommended Groves. Somervell met Groves outside the hearing room where Groves had been testifying before a United States Congress committee on military housing and informed him that "The Secretary of War has selected you for a very important assignment, and the President has approved the selection ... If you do the job right, it will win the war." Groves could not hide his disappointment at not receiving a combat assignment: "Oh, that thing," he replied (having heard of the Manhattan Project).

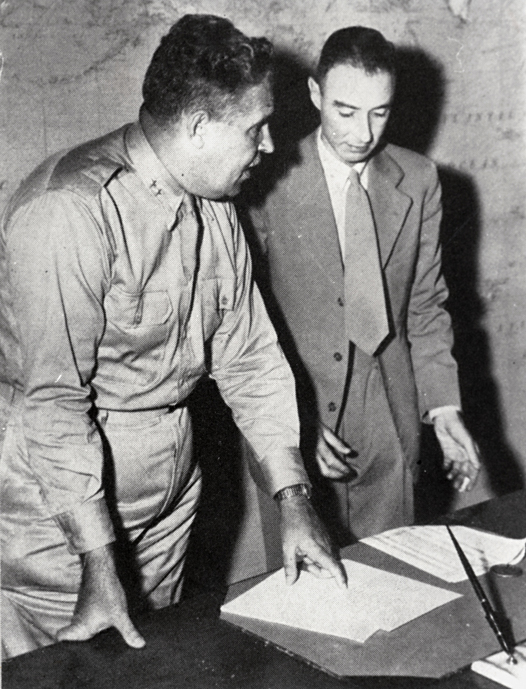
Groves (left) and Robert Oppenheimer

Groves met with Major General Wilhelm D. Styer in his office at the Pentagon to discuss the details. They agreed that in order to avoid suspicion, Groves would continue to supervise the Pentagon project. He would be promoted to brigadier general, as it was felt that the title "general" would hold more sway with the academic scientists working on the Manhattan Project. Groves therefore waited until his promotion came through on 23 September 1942 before assuming his new command so the scientists (in academia the prerogatives of rank were more important than in the Army) would think of him as a general rather than a promoted colonel. His orders placed him directly under Somervell rather than Reybold, with Marshall now answerable to Groves.

Groves was given authority to sign contracts for the project from 1 September 1942. The Under Secretary of War, Robert P. Patterson, retrospectively delegated his authority from the President under the War Powers Act of 1941 in a memorandum to Groves dated 17 April 1944. Groves delegated the authority to Kenneth Nichols, except for contracts of $5 million or more that required his authority. The written authority was only given in 1944 when Nichols was about to sign a contract with Du Pont, and it was found that Nichols's original authority to sign project contracts for Marshall was based on a verbal authority from Styer, and Nichols only had the low delegated authority of a divisional engineer.

Groves soon decided to establish his project headquarters on the fifth floor of the New War Department Building, now known as the Harry S Truman Building, in Washington, D.C., where Marshall had maintained a liaison office. In August 1943, the MED headquarters moved to Oak Ridge, Tennessee, but the name of the district did not change. Construction accounted for roughly 90 percent of the Manhattan Project's total cost. The day after Groves took over, he and Marshall took a train to Tennessee to inspect the site that Marshall had chosen for the proposed production plant at Oak Ridge. Groves was suitably impressed with the site, and steps were taken to condemn the land. Protests, legal appeals, and congressional inquiries were to no avail. By mid-November U.S. Marshals were tacking notices to vacate on farmhouse doors, and construction contractors were moving in.

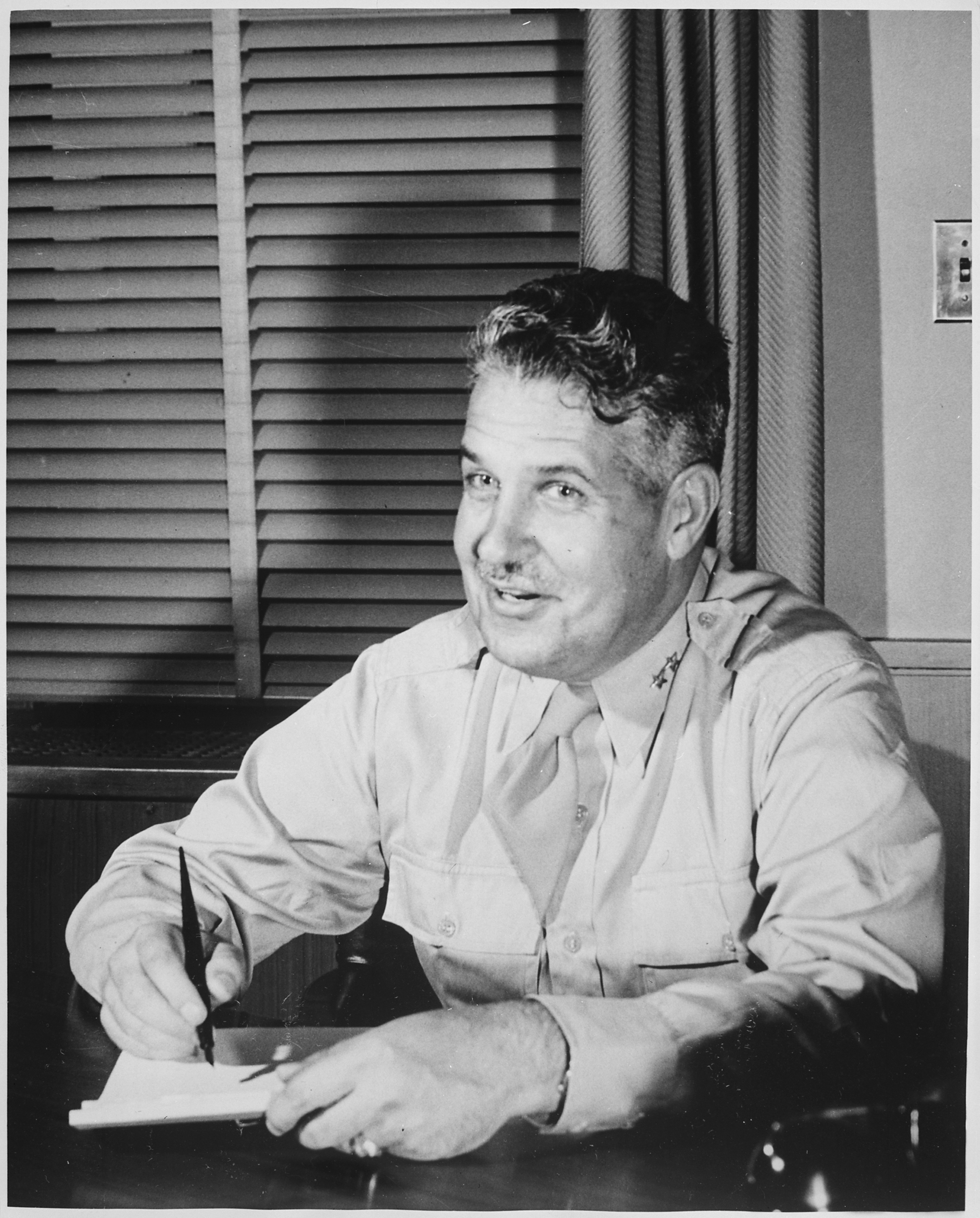
Groves at his desk, 1945

Meanwhile, Groves had met with J. Robert Oppenheimer, a physicist at the University of California, Berkeley, and discussed the creation of a laboratory where the bomb could be designed and tested. Groves was impressed with the breadth of Oppenheimer's knowledge. He had a long conversation on a train after a meeting in Chicago on October 15, when Groves invited Oppenheimer to join Marshall and Nichols on the 20th Century Limited train returning to New York. After dinner on the train they discussed the project while squeezed into Nichols's one-person roomette, and when Oppenheimer left the train at Buffalo, Nichols had no doubt that he should direct the new lab. Groves saw that Oppenheimer thoroughly understood the issues involved in setting up a laboratory in a remote area. These were features that Groves found lacking in other scientists, and he knew that broad knowledge would be vital in an interdisciplinary project that would involve not just physics, but chemistry, metallurgy, ordnance, and engineering.

In October 1942 Groves and Oppenheimer inspected sites in New Mexico, where they selected a suitable location for the laboratory at Los Alamos. Unlike Oak Ridge, the ranch school at Los Alamos, along with 54,000 acres (22,000 ha) of surrounding forest and grazing land, was soon acquired. Groves also detected in Oppenheimer something that many others did not, an "overweening ambition" which Groves reckoned would supply the drive necessary to push the project to a successful conclusion. Groves became convinced that Oppenheimer was the best and only man to run the laboratory.

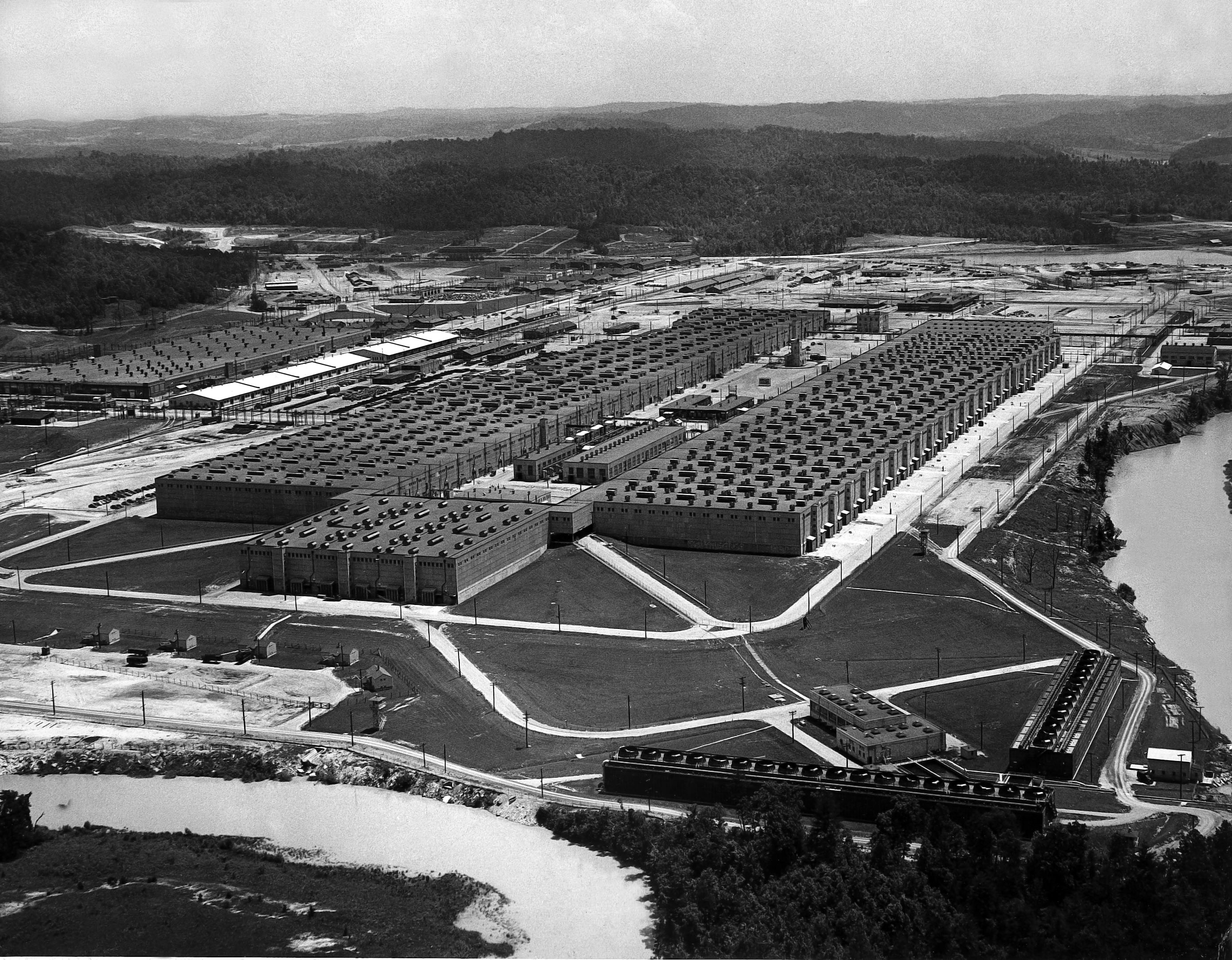
The Oak Ridge K-25 Plant

Few agreed with him in 1942. Oppenheimer had little administrative experience and, unlike other potential candidates, no Nobel Prize. There was also concern about whether Oppenheimer was a security risk, as many of his associates were communists, including his brother Frank Oppenheimer, his wife Katherine Oppenheimer, and his girlfriend Jean Tatlock. Oppenheimer's Communist Party connections soon came to light, but Groves personally waived the security requirements and issued Oppenheimer a clearance on 20 July 1943. Groves's faith in Oppenheimer was ultimately justified. Oppenheimer's inspirational leadership fostered practical approaches to designing and building bombs. Asked years later why Groves chose him, Oppenheimer replied that the general "had a fatal weakness for good men." Isidor Rabi considered the appointment "a real stroke of genius on the part of General Groves, who was not generally considered to be a genius ..."

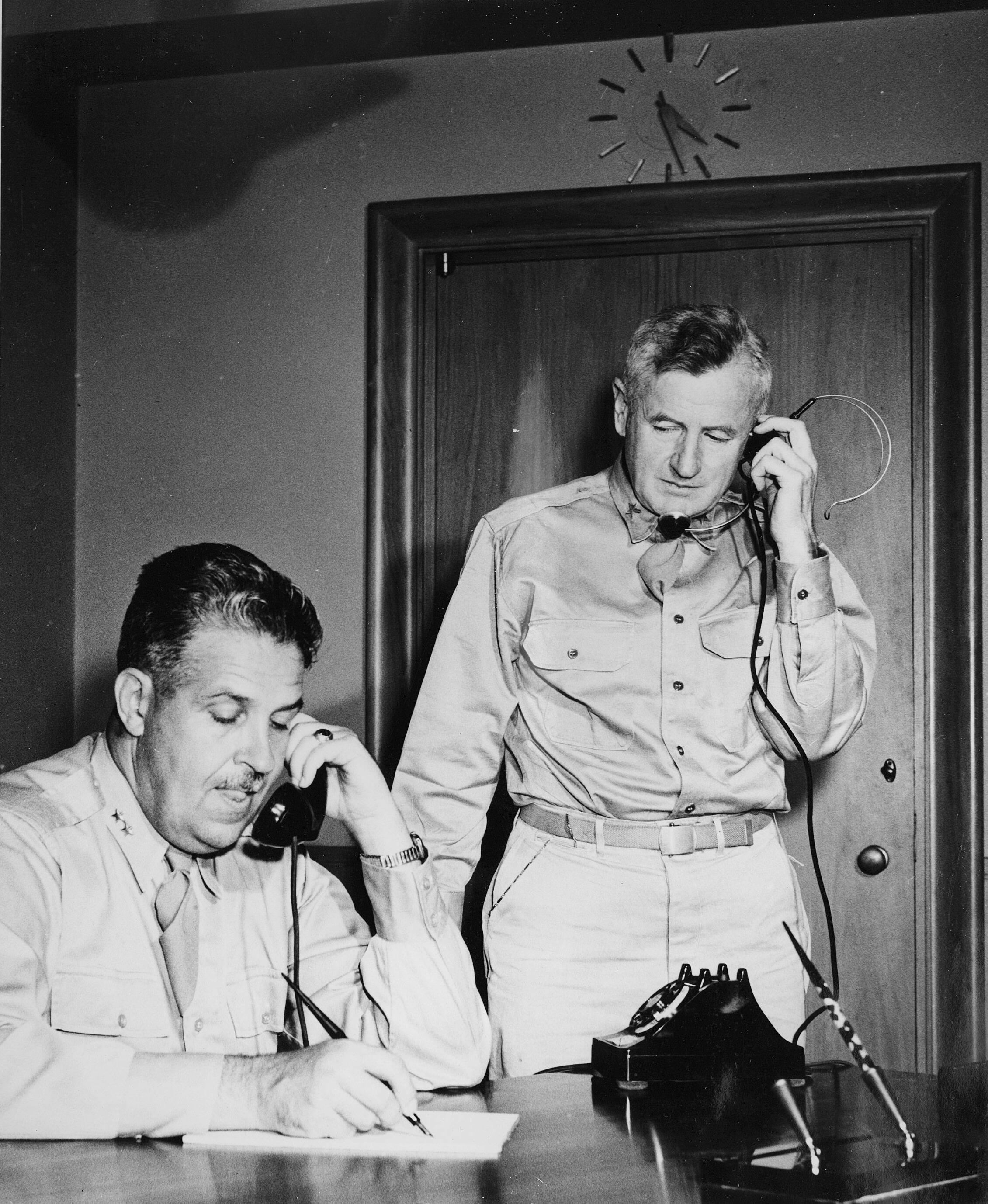
Groves and Brigadier General Thomas Farrell in 1945

Groves made critical decisions on prioritizing the various methods of isotope separation and acquiring raw materials needed by the scientists and engineers. By the time he assumed command of the project, it was evident that the AA-3 priority rating that Marshall had obtained was insufficient. The top ratings were AA-1 through AA-4 in descending order, although there was also a special AAA rating reserved for emergencies. Ratings AA-1 and AA-2 were for essential weapons and equipment, so Colonel Lucius D. Clay, the deputy chief of staff at Services and Supply for requirements and resources, felt that the highest rating he could assign was AA-3, although he was willing to provide an AAA rating on request for critical materials to remove bottlenecks. Groves went to Donald M. Nelson, the chairman of the War Production Board and, after threatening to take the matter to the President, obtained a AAA priority for the Manhattan project. It was agreed that the AA-3 priority would still be used where possible.

The Combined Development Trust was established by the governments of the United Kingdom, United States and Canada in June 1944, with Groves as its chairman, to procure uranium and thorium ores on international markets. In 1944, the trust purchased 3,440,000 pounds (1,560,000 kg) of uranium oxide ore from companies operating mines in the Belgian Congo. In order to avoid briefing the Treasury Secretary, Henry Morgenthau Jr., on the project, a special account not subject to the usual auditing and controls was used to hold Trust monies. Between 1944 and the time he resigned from the Trust in 1947, Groves deposited a total of $37.5 million into the Trust's account.

Worried by the heavy losses occurring during the Battle of the Bulge, in late December 1944, President Franklin D. Roosevelt requested atomic bombs be dropped on Germany during his only meeting with Groves during the war. Groves informed him the first workable bomb was six months away.

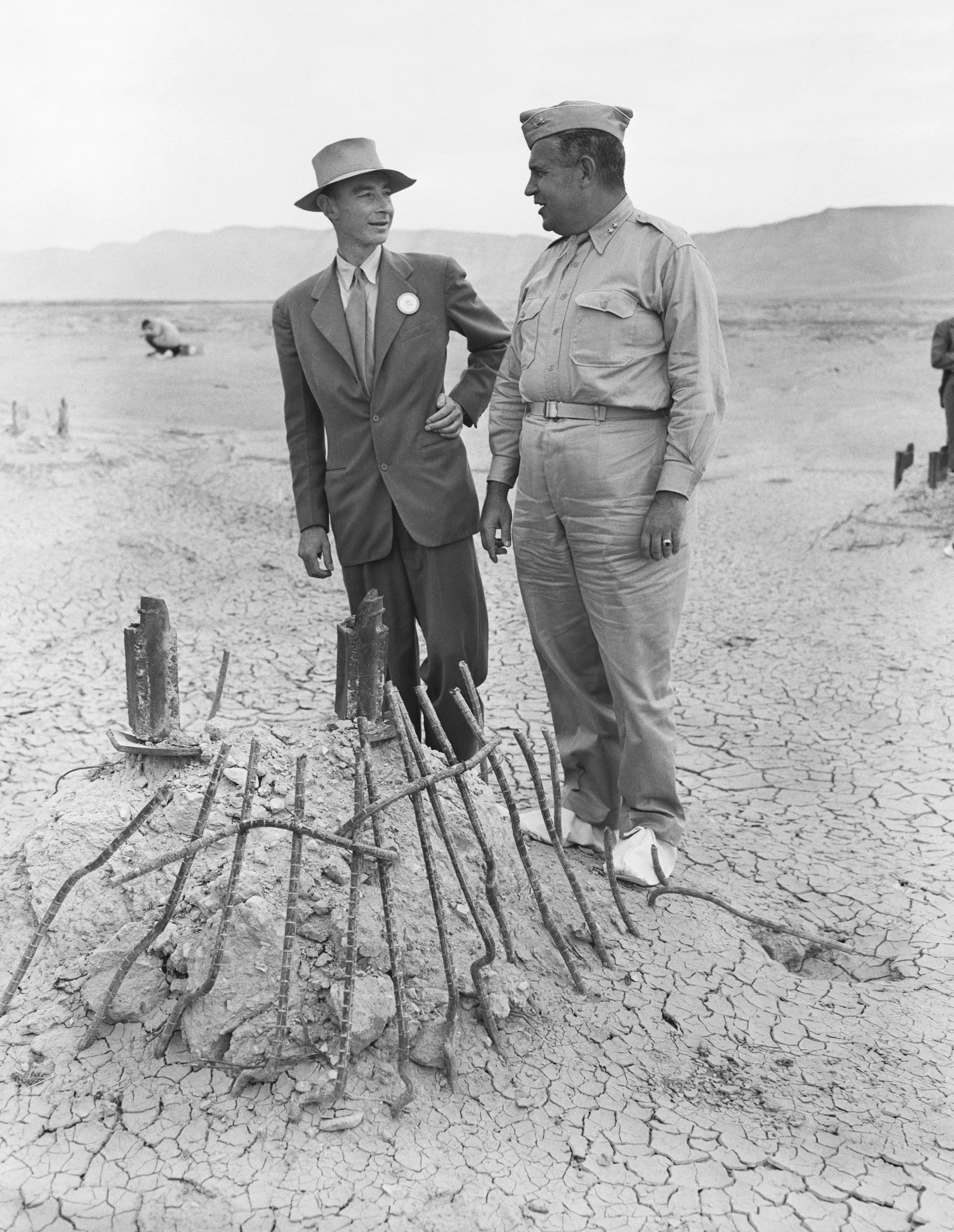
Groves and Oppenheimer at the Trinity test site in September 1945. The white overshoes were to prevent fallout from sticking to the soles of their shoes.

In 1943, the Manhattan District became responsible for collecting military intelligence on Axis atomic research. Groves created Operation Alsos, special intelligence teams that would follow in the wake of the advancing armies, rounding up enemy scientists and collecting what technical information and technology they could. Alsos teams ultimately operated in Italy, France and Germany. The security system resembled that of other engineer districts. The Manhattan District organized its own counterintelligence which gradually grew in size and scope, but strict security measures failed to prevent the Soviets from conducting a successful espionage program that stole some of its most important secrets.

Groves met with General Henry H. Arnold, the Chief of U.S. Army Air Forces, in March 1944 to discuss the delivery of the finished bombs to their targets. Groves was hoping that the Boeing B-29 Superfortress would be able to carry the finished bombs. The 509th Composite Group was duly activated on 17 December 1944 at Wendover Army Air Field, Utah, under the command of Colonel Paul W. Tibbets. A joint Manhattan District – USAAF targeting committee was established to determine which cities in Japan should be targets. It recommended Kokura, Hiroshima, Niigata, and Kyoto.

At this point, Secretary of War Henry L. Stimson intervened, announcing that he would be making the targeting decision, and that he would not authorize the bombing of Kyoto. Groves attempted to get him to change his mind several times and Stimson refused every time. Kyoto had been the capital of Japan for centuries, and was of great cultural and religious significance. In the end, Groves asked Arnold to remove Kyoto not just from the list of nuclear targets, but from targets for conventional bombing as well. Nagasaki was substituted for Kyoto as a target.

Groves was promoted to temporary major general on 9 March 1944. After the atomic bombing of Hiroshima and Nagasaki became public knowledge, he was awarded the Distinguished Service Medal. His citation read:

Major General Leslie Richard Groves, as Commanding General, Manhattan Engineer District, Army Service Forces, from June 1942 to August 1945 coordinated, administered and controlled a project of unprecedented, world-wide significance—the development of the Atomic Bomb. His was the responsibility for procuring materiel and personnel, marshalling the forces of government and industry, erecting huge plants, blending the scientific efforts of the United States and foreign countries, and maintaining completely secret the search for a key to release atomic energy. He accomplished his task with such outstanding success that in an amazingly short time the Manhattan Engineer District solved this problem of staggering complexity, defeating the Axis powers in the race to produce an instrument whose peacetime potentialities are no less marvellous than its wartime application is awesome. The achievement of General Groves is of unfathomable importance to the future of the nation and the world.

Groves had previously been nominated for the Distinguished Service Medal for his work on the Pentagon, but to avoid drawing attention to the Manhattan Project, it had not been awarded at the time. After the war, the Decorations Board decided to change it to a Legion of Merit. In recognition of his work on the project, the Belgian government made him a Commander of the Order of the Crown and the British government made him an honorary Companion of the Order of the Bath.

== After the war ==
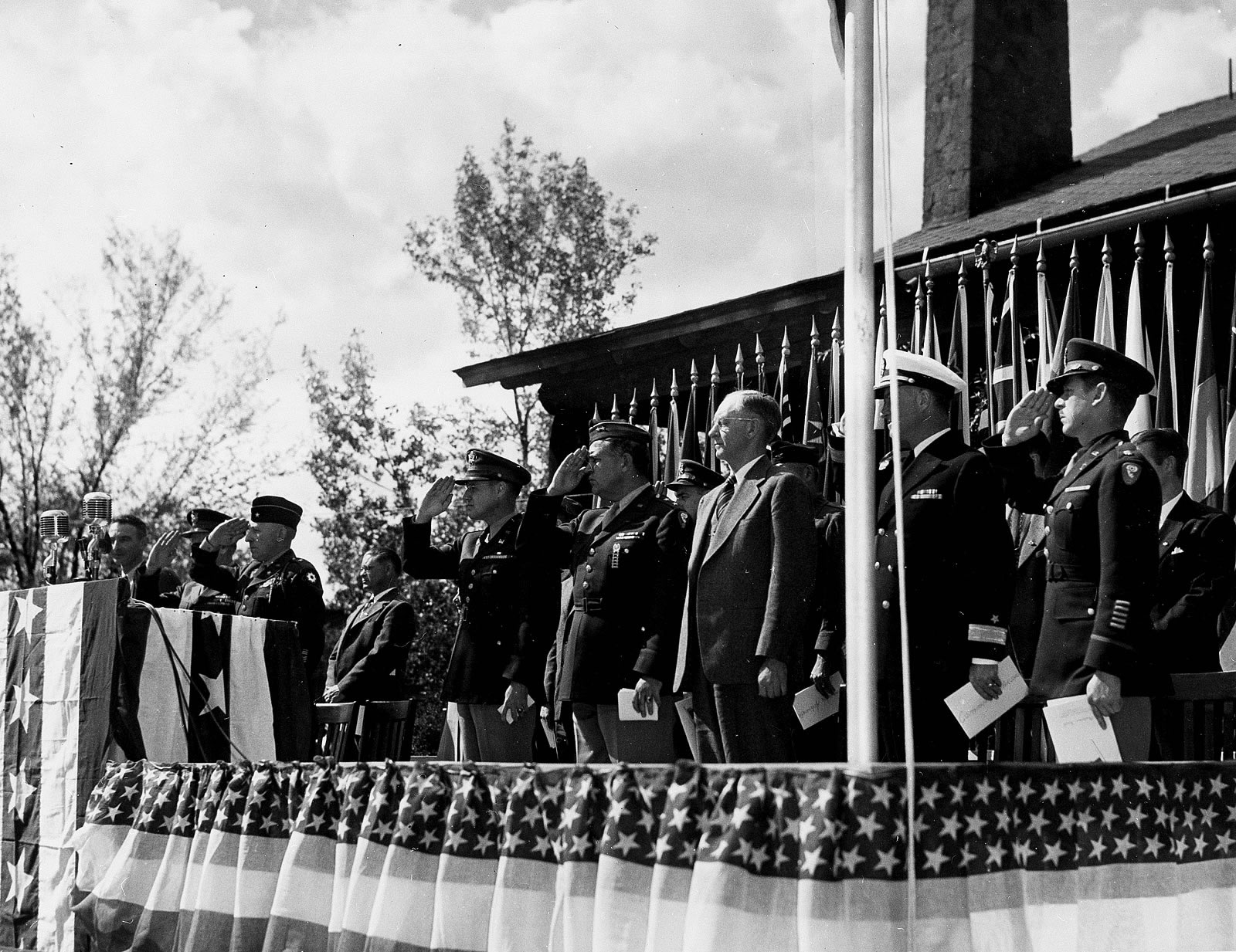
Presentation of the Army-Navy "E" Award at Los Alamos on 16 October 1945. Standing, left to right: Oppenheimer, unidentified, unidentified, Kenneth Nichols, Groves, Robert Sproul, William Parsons.

Responsibility for nuclear power and nuclear weapons was transferred from the Manhattan District to the Atomic Energy Commission on 1 January 1947. On 29 January 1947, the Secretary of War, Robert P. Patterson, and the Secretary of the Navy, James V. Forrestal, issued a joint directive creating the Armed Forces Special Weapons Project (AFSWP) to control the military aspects of nuclear weapons. Groves was appointed its chief on 28 February 1947. In April, AFSWP moved from the New War Department Building to the fifth floor of the Pentagon. Groves had already made a start on the new mission by creating Sandia Base in 1946.

The Chief of Staff of the United States Army, General of the Army Dwight D. Eisenhower, met with Groves on 30 January 1948 to evaluate his performance. Eisenhower recounted a long list of complaints about Groves pertaining to his rudeness, arrogance, insensitivity, contempt for the rules, and maneuvering for promotion out of turn. Eisenhower made it clear that Groves would never become Chief of Engineers.

Groves realized that in the rapidly shrinking postwar military he would not be given any assignment similar in importance to the one he had held in the Manhattan Project, as such posts would go to combat commanders returning from overseas, and he decided to leave the Army. In recognition of his leadership of the Manhattan Project, he received an honorary promotion to lieutenant general by special Act of Congress, effective 24 January 1948, just before his retirement on 29 February 1948. His date of rank was backdated to 16 July 1945, the date of the Trinity nuclear test.

== Later life and death ==
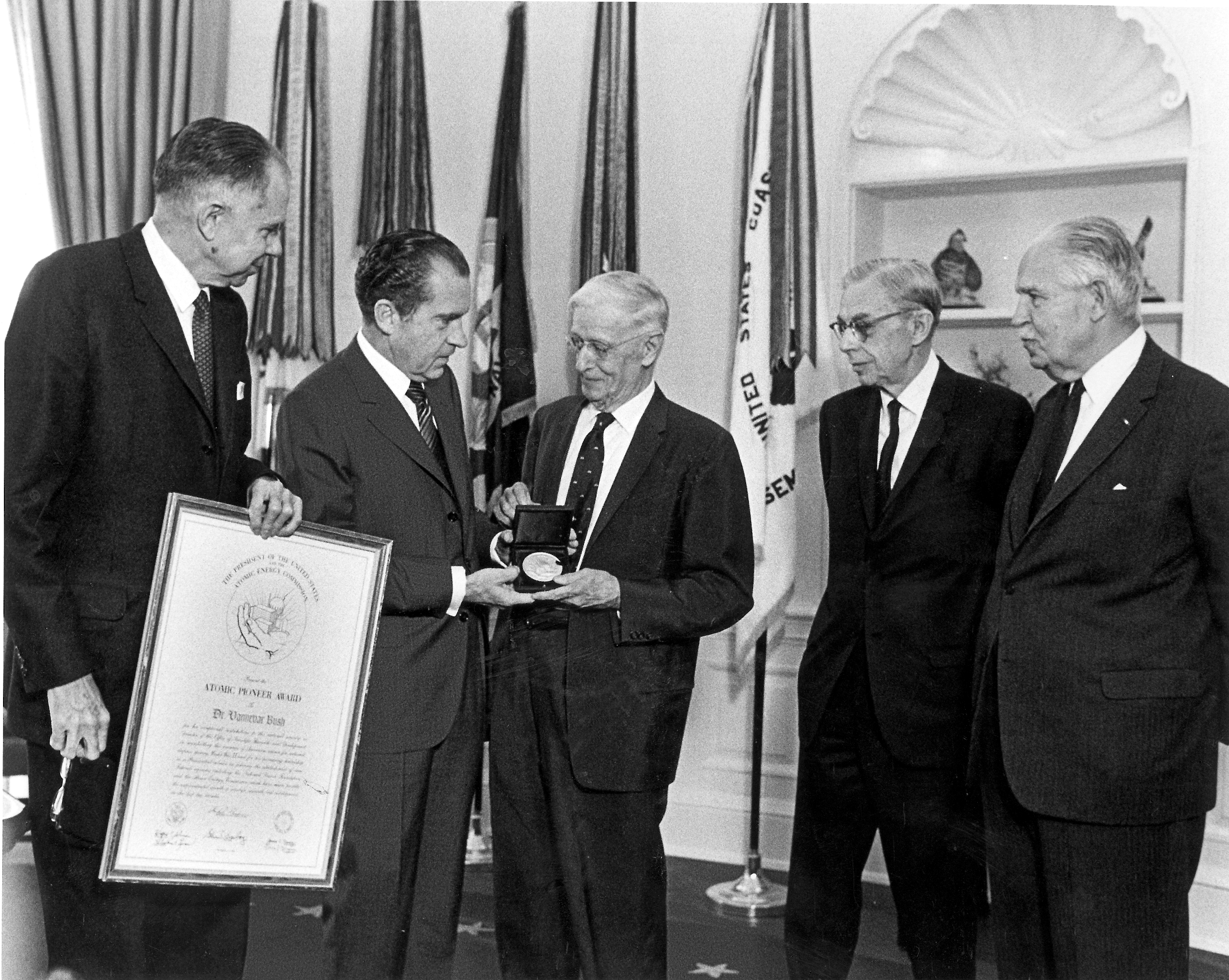
From left to right in a November 1969 photo: Glenn Seaborg, President Richard Nixon and the three awardees of the Atomic Pioneers Award: Vannevar Bush, James B. Conant, and Groves

Groves went on to become a vice president at Sperry Rand, an equipment and electronics firm, and moved to Darien, Connecticut, in 1948, and retired at age 65 in 1961. He also served as president of the West Point alumni organization, the Association of Graduates. He presented General of the Army Douglas MacArthur the Sylvanus Thayer Award in 1962, which was the occasion of MacArthur's famous Duty, Honor, Country speech to the U.S. Military Academy Corps of Cadets. In retirement, Groves wrote an account of the Manhattan Project entitled Now It Can Be Told, originally published in 1962. In 1964, he moved back to Washington, D.C.

Groves suffered a heart attack caused by chronic calcification of the aortic valve on 13 July 1970. He was rushed to Walter Reed Army Medical Center in Washington, D.C., where he died that night at age 73. A funeral service was held in the chapel at Fort Myer, Virginia, after which Groves was interred in Arlington National Cemetery next to his brother Allen, who had died of pneumonia in 1916.

== Legacy ==
Groves is memorialized at a namesake park along the Columbia River, near the Hanford Site in Richland, Washington. At the United States Military Academy, the LTG Leslie R. Groves Award is awarded to the cadet with the highest GPA in major classes associated with nuclear engineering.

The 1980 BBC series, Oppenheimer, featured Manning Redwood as Groves. The same year, he was played by Richard Herd in the American television movie, Enola Gay: The Men, the Mission, the Atomic Bomb. In the 1989 film Fat Man and Little Boy, he was portrayed by Paul Newman, and in the made-for-TV movie of the same year, Day One, by Brian Dennehy. In 1995, Groves was portrayed by Richard Masur in the Japanese-Canadian made-for-television movie Hiroshima. He was portrayed by Eric Owens in the 2007 Lyric Opera of Chicago's work Doctor Atomic. The opera follows Oppenheimer, Groves, Edward Teller and others in the days preceding the Trinity test. Groves is played by Matt Damon in Christopher Nolan's 2023 film Oppenheimer.

== Dates of rank ==
Insignia	Rank	Component	Date
No insignia	Cadet	United States Military Academy	15 June 1916
	Second Lieutenant	Regular Army	1 November 1918
	First Lieutenant	Regular Army	1 May 1919
	Captain	Regular Army	20 October 1934
	Major	Regular Army	1 July 1940
	Lieutenant Colonel	Regular Army	11 December 1942
	Colonel (temporary)	Army of the United States	14 November 1940
	Brigadier General (temporary)	Army of the United States	6 September 1942
	Major General (temporary)	Army of the United States	9 March 1944
	Brigadier General	Regular Army	6 December 1945
	Lieutenant General (honorary)	Regular Army	24 January 1948 (with effect from 16 July 1945, per Private Law 394-A of the 80th Congress)
	Major General	Retired	29 February 1948
	Lieutenant General (honorary)	Retired	29 February 1948
