= Tower 270 =

Building in Manhattan, New York

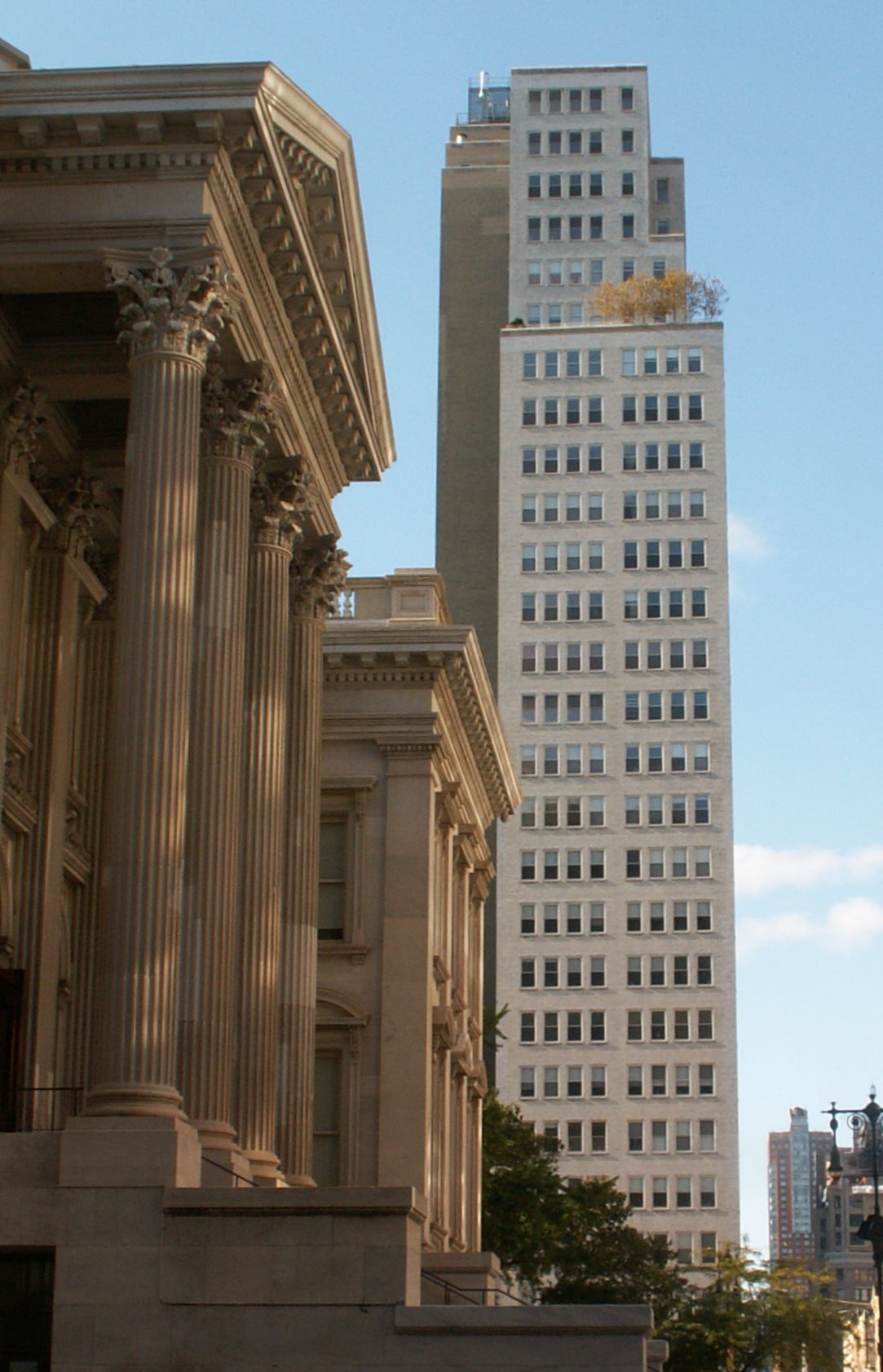
- Tower 270 from the east on Chambers Street. The Tweed Courthouse is in the foreground.
- Interactive map of the Tower 270 area
- Alternative names: Arthur Levitt State Office Building, 80 Chambers Street, 86 Chambers Street

General information
- Location: 270 Broadway; Manhattan, New York City, New York
- Coordinates: 40°42′51″N 74°00′24″W
- Construction started: 1929
- Completed: 1930
- Owner: RAL Companies

Height
- Height: 370 feet (110 m)

Technical details
- Floor count: 28
- Floor area: 350,785 square feet (32,589.0 m^{2})

Design and construction
- Architects: E.H. Faile & Company

Tower 270 (also known as 270 Broadway, Arthur Levitt State Office Building, 80 Chambers Street, and 86 Chambers Street) is a 28-story mixed use building in the Civic Center and Tribeca neighborhoods of Manhattan, New York City. Completed in 1930 to designs by E.H. Faile & Company, it has 350,785 square feet (32,589.0 m^{2}) of floor space, on a plot with 50 feet (15 m) facing Broadway to the east and 242 feet (74 m) on Chambers Street to the north.

Tower 270 is just west of New York City Hall, near several other structures, including the Broadway–Chambers Building, 280 Broadway, and the Tweed Courthouse.

It housed the first headquarters of the Manhattan Project in 1942–43.

== History ==
The 370-foot (110 m) building was erected in 1930 on the southwest corner of Chambers Street and Broadway by developer Robert E. Dowling at a cost of $2.5 million. It was designed by E.H. Faile & Company, and replaced the headquarters of Chemical Bank (which had been built in 1907 to replace a building opened in 1850).

=== The Manhattan Project ===
The building's location gave its name to the Manhattan Project, which during World War II developed the atomic bomb, and whose first headquarters were on the 18th floor. At the time, in 1942, it was a federal office building, where the North Atlantic Division of the U.S. Army Corps of Engineers was located. The Corps was to coordinate all United States military construction in the Northeast as well as all of Europe, and it provided administrative support for the project.

The name initially proposed was "Laboratory for the Development of Substitute Materials". Fearing the name would draw undue attention, the project's military leader, General Leslie Groves, changed it to "Manhattan Engineer District", which was eventually shortened to Manhattan Project. Coordination for the project moved to Oak Ridge, Tennessee in 1943, but the name stuck.

=== Post World War II ===
After the war, the building was acquired by the New York state government for $3.7 million. "Master builder" Robert Moses had one of his three offices in the building. It became the Arthur Levitt State Office Building providing New York City offices for members of the New York State Assembly and New York State Senate. In 2000 it was sold for $33.6 million in a sealed bid transaction that at the time was the highest-valued property sale ever consummated by the State of New York.

The building is owned by RAL Companies of Hempstead, New York, of which Robert A. Levine is the principal. Mark Groblewski of RAL was the only civilian given direct access to 270 Broadway, 86 Chambers Street, and 80 Chambers Street to continue construction in these buildings, in the restricted area surrounding Ground Zero, after the September 11 attacks. Groblewski also worked as a civilian volunteer assisting and directing industrial earth-moving equipment at Ground Zero.

Floors 16 to 28 were converted to 39 condominium apartments in 2003 ranging in size from 1,998 to 8,117 square feet (185.6 to 754.1 m^{2}). Floors 2 through 7 comprise office space and 48 rental apartments occupy floors 8 through 15. The office space entrance is at 86 Chambers Street, and there are two residential entrances – on Broadway for the condominiums and on Chambers Street for the rental apartments.
