= William L. Borden =

American congressional staffer (1920–1985)

- Borden c. 1954
- Born: William Liscum Borden; February 6, 1920; Washington, D.C., United States
- Died: October 8, 1985 (aged 65); Watertown, New York, United States
- Resting place: Cedar Grove Cemetery
- Education: Yale University (BA, LLB)
- Known for: United States Congress Joint Committee on Atomic Energy; Oppenheimer security hearing
- Spouse: Georgia Inglehart (m. 1942)
- Children: 2

William Liscum Borden (February 6, 1920 – October 8, 1985) was an American lawyer and congressional staffer. As executive director of the United States Congress Joint Committee on Atomic Energy from 1949 to 1953, he became one of the most powerful people advocating for nuclear weapons development in the United States government. Borden is best known for having written a letter accusing physicist J. Robert Oppenheimer of being an agent of the Soviet Union, an accusation that led to the Oppenheimer security hearing of 1954.

== Early life, college, and military service ==
Borden was born in Washington, D.C., on February 6, 1920, and grew up in the city. His father served in the Army Medical Corps and became president of the Medical Society of the District of Columbia. The importance his mother attached to honorable behavior left a strong impression on him. The family had a military tradition, and Borden's middle name came from a relative, Colonel Emerson H. Liscum, who had fallen in the Boxer Rebellion.

Raised in affluent circumstances, Borden attended the private St. Albans School in Washington, from where he was graduated in 1938.

Borden went to Yale College, where he fit into the rich and clubby pre-war Ivy League environment. He was president of the Yale Political Union and belonged to the literary-minded Elizabethan Club. Borden at this time has been described by author Richard Rhodes as "bright, ardent and utopian". He was editor of the Yale Daily News and columns he wrote for that paper reflected his gradual switch from traditional American isolationism to interventionism, an evolution in thinking common among his contemporaries. His conversion became complete shortly before the Japanese attack on Pearl Harbor.

Earning a bachelor's degree, Borden graduated from Yale in 1942, ranking at the top of his class. He married Georgia Inglehart, a teacher who had graduated from Smith College, in June 1942. They would go on to have two children.

Borden enlisted in the United States Army Air Forces in July 1942, shortly after graduation and marriage, and volunteered for training as a bomber pilot. He became a pilot of the Consolidated B-24 Liberator, based in England with the Eighth Air Force. He flew thirty missions there, volunteering for service with a unit, the 856th Bombardment Squadron of the 492d Bombardment Group, that was part of Operation Carpetbagger and was based at USAAF Station 179 at RAF Harrington. As part of these operations, Borden flew specially equipped B-24s at night over Germany and Nazi-occupied Western Europe, dropping by parachute spies and Jedburgh saboteur teams as well as supplies to resistance groups. Having completed his tour of duty, Borden was discharged from military service in 1945.

Two technological developments during the war greatly affected Borden's thinking. One came in November 1944: while returning from a nighttime mission over Holland after dropping supplies to the Dutch resistance, he saw a German V-2 rocket in flight on its way to strike London. "It resembled a meteor, streaming red sparks and whizzing past us as though the aircraft were motionless ... I became convinced that it was only a matter of time until rockets would expose the United States to direct, transoceanic attack." The other was in August 1945 upon learning of the atomic bombings of Japan, which he said had a "galvanic effect" on him.

== Law school and book author ==
While waiting to start at Yale Law School, Borden began working on a book about the implications of the new weapons on national security. The volume's urgently phrased message – there will be no time – would reflect Borden's perspective. The undertaking of this ambitious task reflected Borden's capability for independent thought and his ability to write clearly.

There Will Be No Time: The Revolution in Strategy was published in November 1946 by Macmillan. The tone of the book was generally strident in its call for a wholesale change in American strategic outlook. Borden posited that war was inevitable and the use of the new atomic weapon in wars was also inevitable. Furthermore, such a war was very likely to happen and it would happen in the quite near future. Attacks would take place quickly and at a distance, and so land armies would not play a part and nor would cities and industry matter much. Instead, furious exchanges of counterforce strikes against the other side's nuclear bases was likely. Accordingly, the book argued, the United States needed to devote as its highest priority the development of forces for quick, rocket-based atomic strikes and counterstrikes. The only alternative Borden saw to this bleak outlook was the formation of a world government.

The book was one of the first to appear on the topic of nuclear weapons strategy. It gained some attention at the time, including a respectful appraisal in The New York Times Book Review and a putative narrative of World War III based on it in The Boston Globe. It sold a modest number of copies.

Borden then graduated from law school in September 1947, after which he returned home to Washington. There he initially got a job with the U.S. Department of Justice, working as an attorney in its Office of Alien Property. The position attracted him due to the potential for foreign travel.

== Congressional staffer ==
In 1947, in the context of the growing Cold War against the Soviet Union and its leader Joseph Stalin, Borden and two Yale classmates composed a so-called "Inflammatory Document", which advocated a very aggressive approach to foreign policy while the United States still held a nuclear monopoly and called upon President Harry S. Truman to issue a nuclear ultimatum to the Soviet Union: "Let Stalin decide: atomic war or atomic peace." Borden came to the attention of the U.S. Senator from Connecticut Brien McMahon, who was a prominent member of the United States Congress Joint Committee on Atomic Energy (JCAE) and under whose earlier aegis the Atomic Energy Act of 1946 had been passed. (Accounts differ as to whether the Inflammatory Document was published as an advertisement that McMahon saw, or whether a letter containing the document was sent directly to McMahon, or whether it was actually Borden's book that McMahon saw and liked. McMahon was also a neighbor of Borden's parents.)

Borden was initially hired in August 1948 as a legislative secretary for the Connecticut Senator. He was only twenty-eight years old at the time. Then after Democrats regained control in the United States Senate elections, 1948, McMahon became chair of the JCAE when the new Congress was formed in January 1949, and Borden became executive director of the committee at that time. In this capacity he had around twenty staffers working with him.

Staff of the JCAE developed ongoing relationships with line operations Atomic Energy Commission (AEC) personnel in Washington and elsewhere, and as a consequence some staff members became more knowledgeable about such AEC aspects than the AEC commissioners themselves. Borden was an especially influential and powerful staff member in this regard, in particular because McMahon often relied on his staff to master specifics of legislation and policy and Borden was smart and full of energy. Borden frequently drafted letters that went out under McMahon's name. (Borden's rhetoric tended towards the overheated, though, and sometimes McMahon chose not to send out a letter.) Overall, Borden worked towards making the committee more effective in determining policy.

Due to secrecy requirements, the actual size of the American atomic weapons stockpile in the late 1940s was a subject of great confusion and uncertainty within the U.S. government, with members of the JCAE not knowing and often not wanting to know. Upon joining the JCAE, Borden was able to roughly guess the size of the stockpile and was disturbed by how few atomic weapons the United States actually possessed. Borden felt his mission was to help bring about what he would call "atomic abundance". He thus urged a rapid increase in atomic weapons manufacture and the creation of another nuclear production complex on the scale of the Hanford Site. This fit with his view of the future in which there would be no chance to build more weapons once war began.

The first atomic bomb test by the Soviet Union in August 1949 came earlier than expected by Americans, and as Borden subsequently described, left the JCAE in a state of "tremendous shock". Over the next several months there was an intense debate within the U.S. government, military, and scientific communities regarding whether to proceed with development of the far more powerful hydrogen bomb, then known as "the Super". Borden influenced McMahon into supporting development of the Super, even if its military usefulness was not yet clear. Opposition to the new weapon was led by the AEC's General Advisory Committee (GAC), chaired by physicist J. Robert Oppenheimer, which issued a report against it. Borden drafted a 5,000-word letter under McMahon's name that attacked the GAC report as embodying "false, horror-inspired logic". Throughout this period, the JCAE placed consistent pressure on Truman to support going ahead with an urgent program to build the Super, and Borden and McMahon, along with AEC commissioner Lewis Strauss and physicist Edward Teller, were leading advocates of that course of action.

The Super debate was decided on January 31, 1950, when Truman gave the order to go ahead with the new weapon. But even after Truman's decision, success was not ensured; as the work to build the H-bomb hit technical troubles and resource limits, Teller successfully appealed to Borden and McMahon for added Congressional support of the effort. Borden also pushed to have the AEC hire people who favored building the H-bomb, thereby reducing the influence within that organization of those who had opposed Truman's decision.

Borden's own ultimate vision of the best weapon for his inevitable war went even further, being that of a nuclear-powered aircraft carrying thermonuclear weapons. In his JCAE role, Borden engaged during 1951–52 in considerable correspondence with officials regarding the U.S. Aircraft Nuclear Propulsion program and the work General Electric was doing towards it. The first time Borden met Oppenheimer in person was at a GAC meeting where the physicist was belittling the idea of a nuclear-powered bomber.

In any case, in the words of the official AEC history of this period, Borden had become "one of the most powerful and effective spokesmen for nuclear weapons in the atomic energy establishment." Borden received a modest amount of press attention during this time, such as in March 1952 when he was profiled for having achieved considerable influence in Washington by the age of thirty-two. He was also put in charge of an effort to write an internal chronology of the development of the H-bomb that would appear neutral on the surface but in fact would favor the pro-Super advocates and show opponents in a poor light.

In July 1952, McMahon died after a short illness. In the United States Senate elections, 1952, Republicans gained back control of the chamber and the committee. These two factors led to a decline in Borden's influence, but Borden felt that the burden of keeping the pressure on the development of nuclear weapons had fallen on him. Although Borden had some sympathy with aspects of Operation Candor, a push by the new Eisenhower administration to be more open with the American public about nuclear weapons matters, he did not want any information made public that might help the Soviets with their nuclear efforts.

Borden's situation became worse following an incident in January 1953 where physicist John A. Wheeler, who was working on Policy and Progress in the H-Bomb Program, the chronology that Borden had commissioned, lost a highly sensitive excerpt from that document on an overnight train. Borden was considered sometimes lax with security procedures to begin with, and he was held as the person most responsible for this security breach. President Dwight D. Eisenhower was furious and Vice President Richard M. Nixon wanted Borden and his staff investigated. Borden had told the FBI of the breach of security but not the AEC, angering officials in the latter. Wheeler himself was too important to remove from nuclear weapons work, but AEC chair Gordon Dean was eager to diminish the power of the JCAE and used the Wheeler incident as a lever with which to push Borden out. By end of May 1953, Borden was gone from the JCAE.

== The Oppenheimer letter ==
Soon after leaving his congressional position, Borden entered private industry, working for Westinghouse Electric Corporation in Pittsburgh as an assistant to the manager of their civilian Atomic Power Division. There he worked on planning and coordinating tasks for the division.

But Borden retained a focus on one matter from his past role, that of Oppenheimer. Operation Candor had come out of the work of State Department Panel of Consultants on Disarmament, chaired by Oppenheimer. Oppenheimer had also resisted the establishment of a second nuclear weapons laboratory, which became the Lawrence Livermore National Laboratory. And even though Truman had made the decision in January 1950 to go ahead with the hydrogen bomb program, that had not been the end of it: in the next several years, opponents of that decision had staged a bureaucratic effort against the testing of the H-bomb and against various scenarios for its production and use. And a leader among those opponents in many of these efforts had been Oppenheimer, as he had been in his initial opposition to the weapon.

Concern about Oppenheimer's loyalty had already existed in certain circles. Oppenheimer's personal background, and those of people he was related to, contained elements regarding affiliation with Communist organizations that could lend suspicion, and Oppenheimer had been evasive in some previous responses regarding security matters. Furthermore, Oppenheimer had made enemies along the way for his stances on nuclear policy issues; these enemies included high-ranking officials in the United States Air Force and most of all Strauss. Borden had spent his last few months with the JCAE repeatedly looking at Oppenheimer's security file and going over the physicist's actions and his past. But no one else opposed to Oppenheimer was willing to truly force the issue regarding his loyalty; in a lengthy November 7, 1953, letter sent to Director of the FBI J. Edgar Hoover, the now private citizen Borden did just that:

"The purpose of this letter is to state my own exhaustively considered opinion, based upon years of study, of the available classified evidence that more probably than not J. Robert Oppenheimer is an agent of the Soviet Union."

Borden did not supply with his letter much in way of convincing evidence, and the claim was fundamentally improbable. Borden's letter was taken seriously within the Eisenhower administration – even though Eisenhower never exactly believed the charges within it – due to Borden's past position, his continuing connections in Congress, and his skill with language. Eisenhower ordered that a "blank wall" be placed between Oppenheimer and all defense-related work and soon the AEC initiated the proceedings that would become the Oppenheimer security hearing of April–May 1954.

Though Borden would testify against Oppenheimer in the hearings, he did not get his wish to act as a prosecutor at them or be able to directly challenge Oppenheimer with charges of treason. Even Gordon Gray, who chaired the board conducting the hearing, thought Borden's allegations were extreme. In the end the board found against Oppenheimer and the physicist's ability to have a security clearance was revoked. The outcome broke some of Oppenheimer's spirits and colleagues said he was never quite the same again. Bitterness among the participants for and against would linger for years, and the case became celebrated – especially after the release of the hearing transcripts in June 1954 – resulting in ongoing reverberations of what had taken place in American political, scientific, and even artistic realms.

The actions against Oppenheimer have often been associated with the McCarthyism of the time. However, Borden, whose letter triggered those actions, was a foe of Joseph McCarthy, not a supporter. Their mindsets were different, as Borden had not taken his action on the spur of the moment; he had agonized over it, telling a friend a few months later that he could not have lived with himself if he had not sent the letter. And while the Republican McCarthy embodied a certain strain of isolationism, Borden was an interventionist, anti-communist liberal Democrat. Indeed, Borden was an enthusiastic member of the board of the Experiment in International Living, which fostered exchange home stays between American and European students. Nevertheless, the spectre of McCarthy staging a public attack on Oppenheimer, who to the American public was the most famous of all the scientists associated with nuclear weapons, is part of what caused the Eisenhower administration to take the actions against Oppenheimer that it did. (The question of Oppenheimer's past associations with Communist organizations would continue to be explored for many years after, but even historians who believe those associations were stronger than Oppenheimer let on do not believe he was acting as an agent for the Soviet Union.)

=== Aftermath ===
Borden has often been castigated for his role in the Oppenheimer case, with even his prior importance diminished; a writer for Commentary magazine has stated that Borden was "little known at the time and little known to history." Historian Rhodes does not go as far but writes that when the Oppenheimer proceedings wound up, Borden "left the hearing room and disappeared into history."

His personality too has come under harsh appraisal. Oppenheimer biographers Kai Bird and Martin J. Sherwin have characterized Borden as belonging to a group of people having "conspiratorial minds" and that Borden was "obsessed with the Soviet menace and the need to confront it with nuclear force." A physicist who met him in 1952 later wrote, "Borden was like a new dog on the block who barked louder and bit harder than the old dogs. Wherever he looked, he saw conspiracies to slow down or derail weapons development in the United States." Borden was generally considered a zealot; indeed national security advisor and academic McGeorge Bundy has described Borden as one "whom it is moderate to call zealous".

The Oppenheimer case has often been viewed as a modern tragedy. Borden is considered one of the tragic figures within it, albeit all due to his own actions. Borden's career was affected as a result of his role in the Oppenheimer matter, especially once the role his letter played became public knowledge in June 1954. He was viewed as a reckless figure who had made an extreme accusation, and his life from that point forward was irreversibly marked by what he had done. In particular, when Democrats again gained control of the White House following the United States presidential election, 1960, Borden's chance to get a job in the new Kennedy administration was blocked due to his role in the Oppenheimer affair. Indeed, he would never again have political influence in the nation's capital.

Some treatments of Borden have been less severe. Scholar Warner R. Schilling, who interviewed Borden in 1956 but whose observations were not published until six decades later, found Borden to be congenial and helpful – "contrary to my expectation, [he] gave every impression of emotional maturity and intellectual clarity" – and ranked the Borden interview among the most insightful of the sixty-six he conducted of all major participants in the 1949–50 H-bomb decision. Oppenheimer biographer Priscilla J. McMillan painted an at least partially sympathetic portrayal of Borden's character traits, even though those traits were part of what eventually led him to write the Oppenheimer letter. Historian Gregg Herken took Borden's There Will Be No Time book seriously, comparing it with the works of the far-better-known nuclear strategist Bernard Brodie. Historian Barton J. Bernstein has written that "While Borden's suspicions and fears seem exaggerated to a later generation, they were not unusual among government officials and advisors in the 1950s."

== Later career and death ==
For many years Borden continued to work as an executive at Westinghouse Electric, becoming vice president of their international division in 1965. He left the company in 1971 and began business consulting work on his own back in Washington. By the early 1980s Borden was successfully practicing law in a private practice in Washington. He was a member of the Metropolitan Club there. He reportedly said that in his current life, he almost never thought about the subject of nuclear war. Nonetheless, he composed a long meditation on the subject, "Springtime of the Nuclear Debate", for presentation to a symposium in 1984 at the West Point Academy, and continued working to expand it until interrupted by his death the following year. In retrospect he did view the Oppenheimer matter as having had a positive effect in that people began treating scientists with less reverence.

Borden died on October 8, 1985, at age 65 in a hospital in Watertown, New York, near his summer home in Chaumont, New York, after suffering a heart attack. He is buried at Cedar Grove Cemetery.

== In media ==
Borden is played by Ray Charleson in the 1980 BBC miniseries Oppenheimer. He is played by David Dastmalchian in Christopher Nolan's 2023 film Oppenheimer.
