= Isabel Haslup Lamb =

American physician, and the first woman to drive a car in the District of Columbia

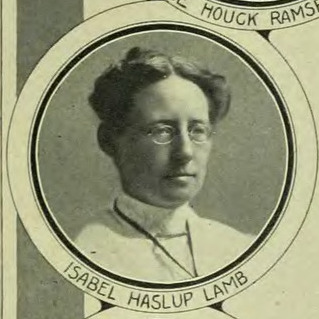
- Born: September 16, 1864; Laurel, Maryland
- Died: January 18, 1936 (aged 71)
- Education: Maryland State Normal School; Howard University College of Medicine
- Occupation: Physician
- Spouse: Daniel S. Lamb (m. 1899)

Isabel Haslup Lamb (1864–1936) was an American physician and co-founder of the Women's Medical Society of the District of Columbia, with Mary Almera Parsons. She was also reportedly the first woman to drive a car in Washington, D.C.

== Early life and education ==
Lamb was born in Laurel, Maryland, on September 16, 1864, to parents Susannah Harrison Haslup and Jonathan Waters Haslup. She had one sister, Alice Elma Haslup, seven nieces, and a nephew. Her great-great-grandfather John Harrison served in the American Revolutionary War with Gabriel Long and Daniel Morgan, qualifying her as a member of the Daughters of the American Revolution. She graduated from Maryland State Normal School, which later became Towson University. She graduated from the Howard University College of Medicine in 1897.

== Work as a medical doctor ==
Lamb and her husband Daniel S. Lamb worked for over 30 years at the Woman's Clinic in Washington, D.C., serving on the board and staff alongside Ida Heiberger, Jeannette J. Sumner, and Annie E. Rice, among other prominent women doctors of the day, with a focus on the health of poor women of color. According to historian Gloria Moldow, along with her husband and other women doctors of her circle, Lamb was known for working closely and well with Black doctors at a time when medicine was highly segregated. One of her specialties was gynecology.

Lamb was also a medical inspector for the DC public schools, and ran a private practice. With Mary Parsons, she was a co-founder of the Women's Medical Society of the District of Columbia. She was a member of the American Medical Association, the District of Columbia Medical Society, and the Southern Maryland Medical Society.

Lamb was a supporter of women's suffrage, and supported the YWCA. She was active in the Woman's Christian Temperance Union, and a member of Foundry Methodist Episcopal Church, which later became Foundry United Methodist Church. She co-authored Rules of Health with her husband.

== Personal life and death ==
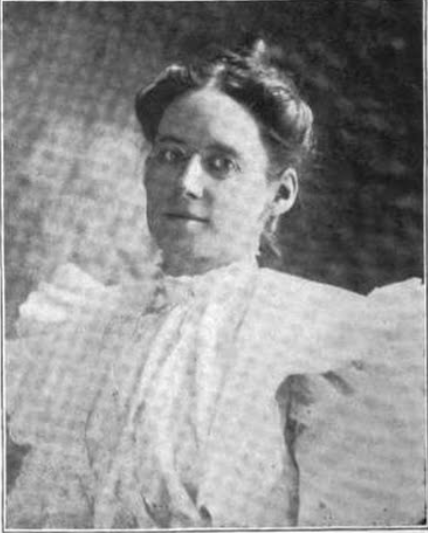
Isabel Lamb when younger

On July 2, 1899, in Towson, Maryland, she married Daniel Smith Lamb (1843–1929), who had been one of her professors at Howard University Medical Center. They had no children. Daniel Lamb became the acting assistant surgeon general, and a pathologist for the Army Medical Museum. He performed the autopsy on president James A. Garfield. Isabel Lamb attended his autopsy, and she donated his right hand to the anatomical collections of the National Museum of Health and Medicine, and his brain to the Wilder Brain Collection at Cornell University. She was said to have donated his skeleton as well, but its location is presently unknown. Isabel Lamb died of a heart attack at age 71, and she and her husband are buried together in Arlington National Cemetery. Her obituary in The Washington Star stated that she was the first woman to drive a "horseless carriage" (automobile) in the District of Columbia, and that her nickname was "Aunt Carester."
