= Clinton Anderson (New Mexico politician) =

American politician (1895–1975)

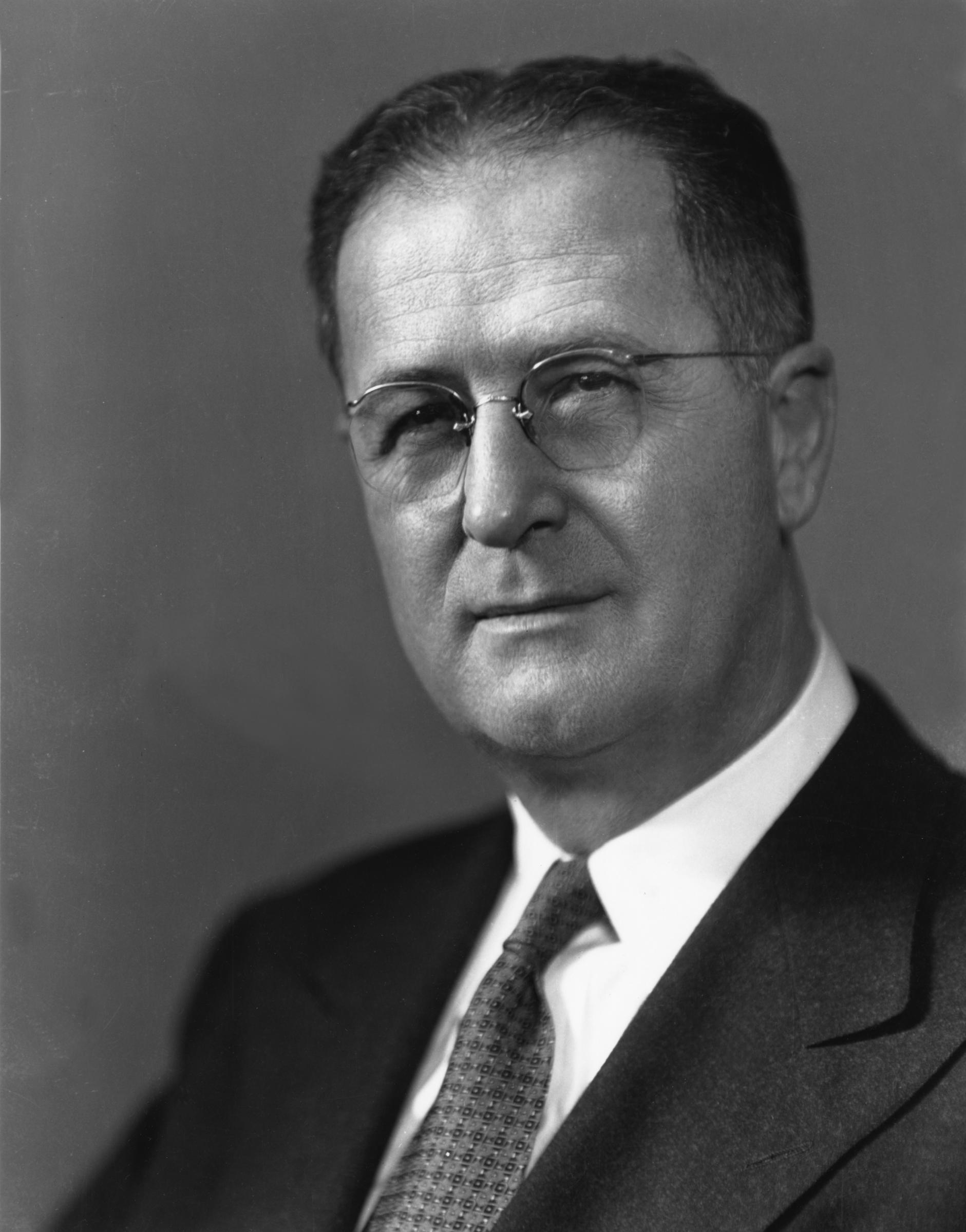
- Official portrait, c. 1945

United States Senator from New Mexico
- In office January 3, 1949 – January 3, 1973
- Preceded by: Carl Hatch
- Succeeded by: Pete Domenici

13th United States Secretary of Agriculture
- In office June 30, 1945 – May 10, 1948
- President: Harry S. Truman
- Preceded by: Claude R. Wickard
- Succeeded by: Charles F. Brannan

Member of the U.S. House of Representatives from New Mexico's at-large district
- In office January 3, 1941 – June 30, 1945
- Preceded by: John J. Dempsey
- Succeeded by: George Lusk

9th Treasurer of New Mexico
- In office 1933–1934
- Governor: Arthur Seligman
- Preceded by: Warren Graham
- Succeeded by: James Connelly

Personal details
- Born: Clinton Presba Anderson; October 23, 1895 Centerville, South Dakota, U.S.
- Died: November 11, 1975 (aged 80) Albuquerque, New Mexico, U.S.
- Party: Democratic
- Spouse: Henrietta McCartney (m. 1921)
- Children: 2

Clinton Presba Anderson (October 23, 1895 – November 11, 1975) was an American politician who represented New Mexico in the United States Senate from 1949 until 1973. A member of the Democratic Party, he previously served as United States Secretary of Agriculture from 1945 until 1948 and represented New Mexico's at-large congressional district from 1941 until 1945.

== Early life and education ==
Anderson was born in Centerville, South Dakota, on October 23, 1895. His parents were Andrew Jay and Hattie Belle Anderson (née Presba). He was educated in the public school system of South Dakota and attended Dakota Wesleyan University (1913–1915) and the University of Michigan (1915–1916) but did not receive a degree from either institution.

== Career ==
=== Early career ===
After his father broke his back in 1916, Anderson left the University of Michigan to go home to help to support his family. He worked for several months for a newspaper in Mitchell, South Dakota, until he became seriously ill with tuberculosis. He was not aware of his illness until he attempted to join the US military in 1917 upon America's entrance into World War I. Doctors gave him six months to live. One gave him the advice to check himself into the Methodist Sanitarium in Albuquerque, New Mexico. He promptly did so, and while recovering there, he occasionally wrote for the Albuquerque Herald.

In 1919, as soon as he was well enough to leave the sanitarium, he gained employment with the Albuquerque Morning Journal, now called the Albuquerque Journal, which was owned by a colorful editor named Carl Magee. Magee sent Anderson to Santa Fe to cover the New Mexico Legislature. Very critical of how the Republican Party was running the state, he befriended some New Mexico Democratic legislators and gave them his ideas on bills before the legislature. Some of the ideas eventually became state law, and Anderson began a lifelong association with the Democratic Party.

His long career of public service began as executive secretary of the New Mexico Public Health Association in 1919. There, he raised money to fight tuberculosis, established county health programs, and was instrumental in founding the New Mexico Department of Health.

In the early 1920s, Anderson pursued private business affairs. In 1922, he started in the insurance business with the New Mexico Loan and Mortgage Company. Anderson was soon able to buy the business and change the name to the Clinton P. Anderson Agency, a successful and enduring enterprise.

Actively involved in the Rotary Club of Albuquerque since 1919, he was elected to the International Board in 1930 and became president of Rotary International in 1932, a position that introduced him to many business and political contacts.

=== New Mexico government and politics ===
Anderson returned to public life, becoming chairman of the New Mexico Democratic Party in 1928 and state treasurer of New Mexico in 1933. That was followed by appointments as director of the Bureau of Revenue, relief administrator for the State of New Mexico, Western States Field Coordinator for the Federal Emergency Relief Administration, State Director of the National Youth Administration, chairman of the New Mexico Unemployment Security Division, and managing director of the Coronado Cuarto Centennial Commission, among others. It was Anderson's style to take on a newly created position or an emergency situation, to organize it, and then to leave when he felt that all was running smoothly.

In 1940, a conflict among members of the state Democratic Party resulted in Congressman John J. Dempsey being disqualified from running for another term as New Mexico's only representative. Party members convinced Anderson to run for the seat, which he won by using his many business and political contacts throughout the state. For the next three decades, he divided his time between Albuquerque and Washington, D.C.

Anderson became known for his thorough investigative work, and during his three terms in the House of Representatives, he was assigned to several special committees, including the chairmanship of the Special Committee to Investigate Food Shortages in 1945. The committee argued for a streamlined food distribution system and emphasized long-range planning for increasing food production. His success in that assignment, along with their personal friendship, led to his appointment by President Harry S. Truman as United States secretary of agriculture.

=== Truman administration ===
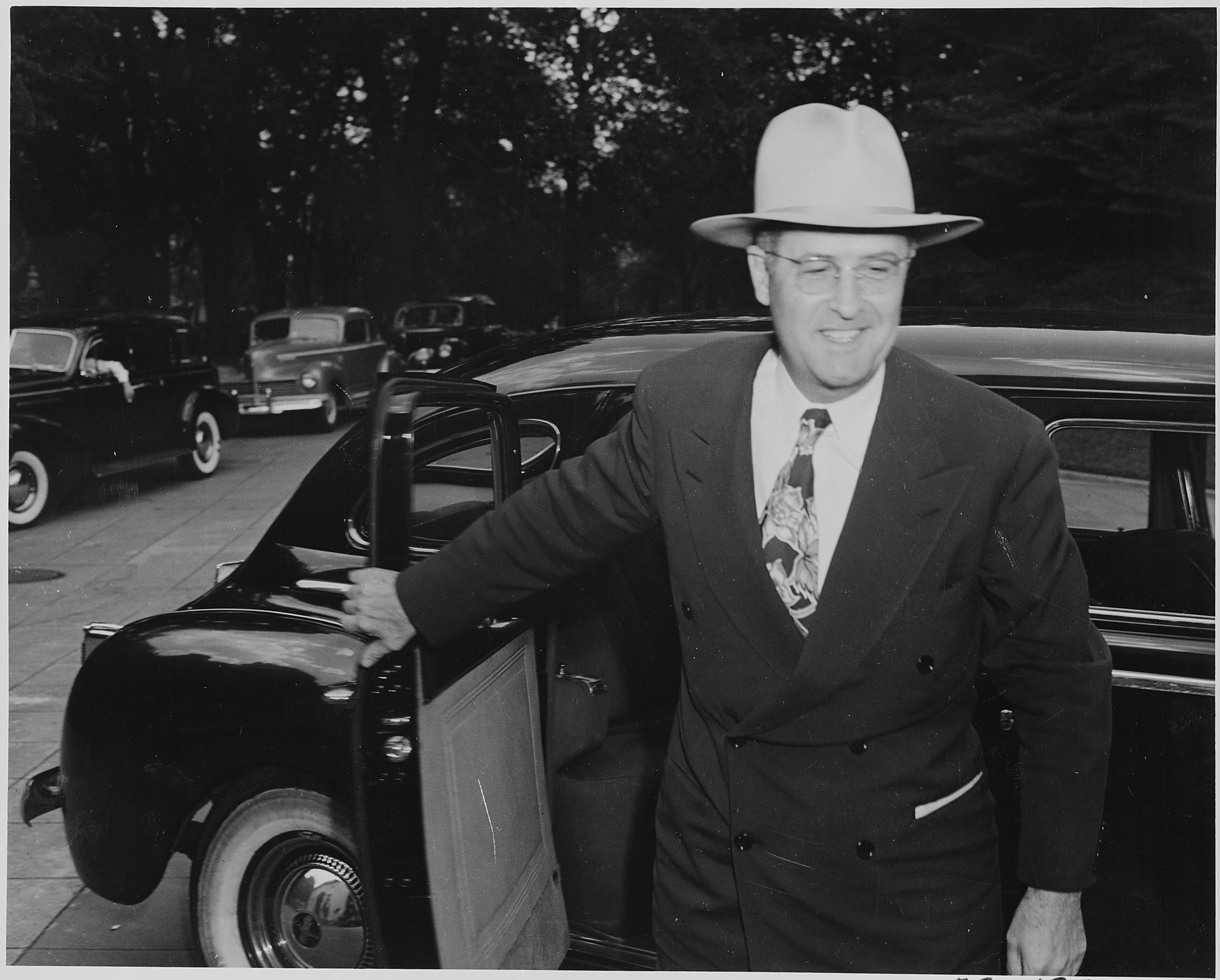
Secretary of Agriculture Clinton P. Anderson arriving at the White House for a Cabinet meeting (August 1945).

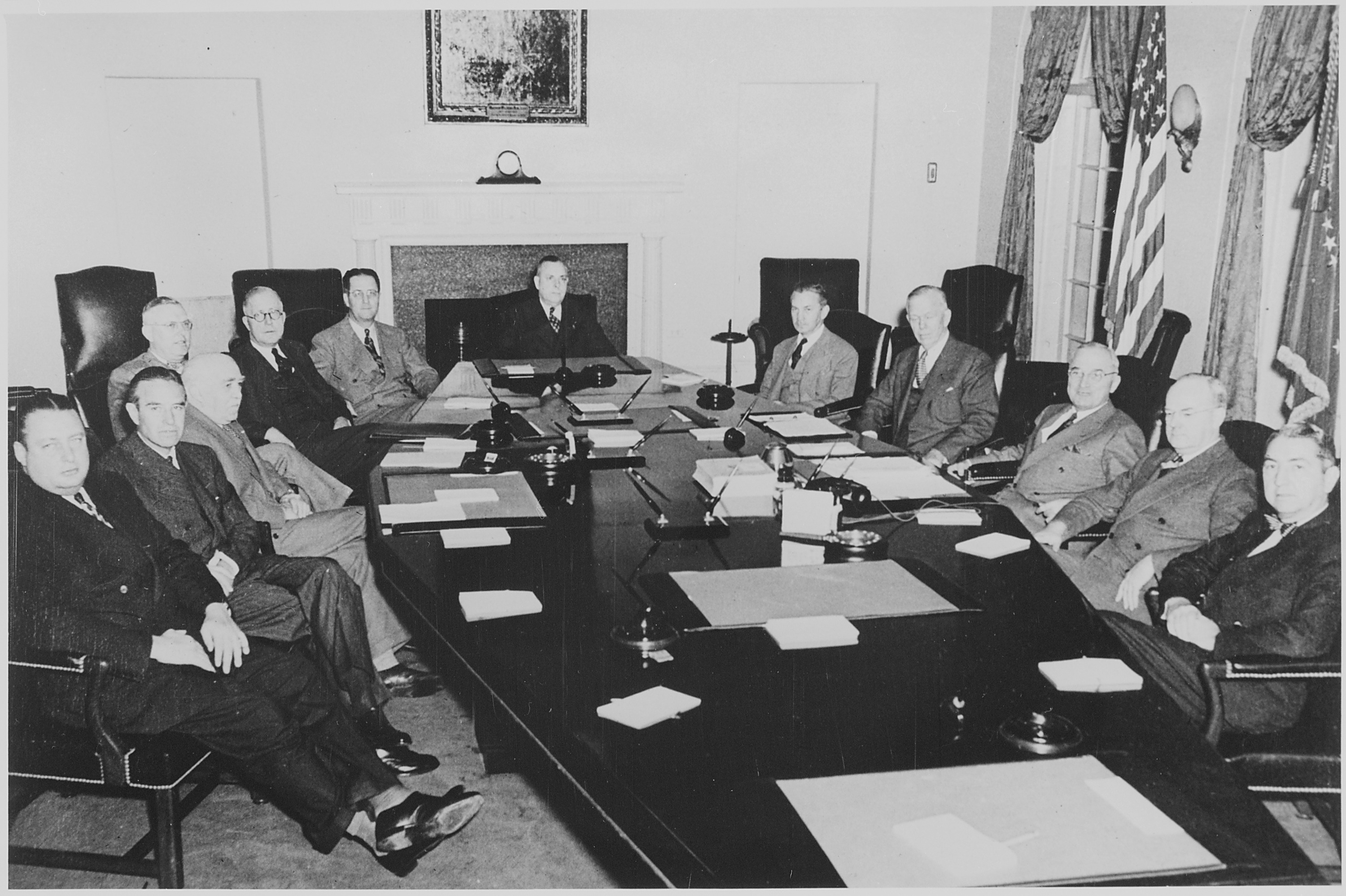
Anderson (center) in the Truman Cabinet (January 1948).

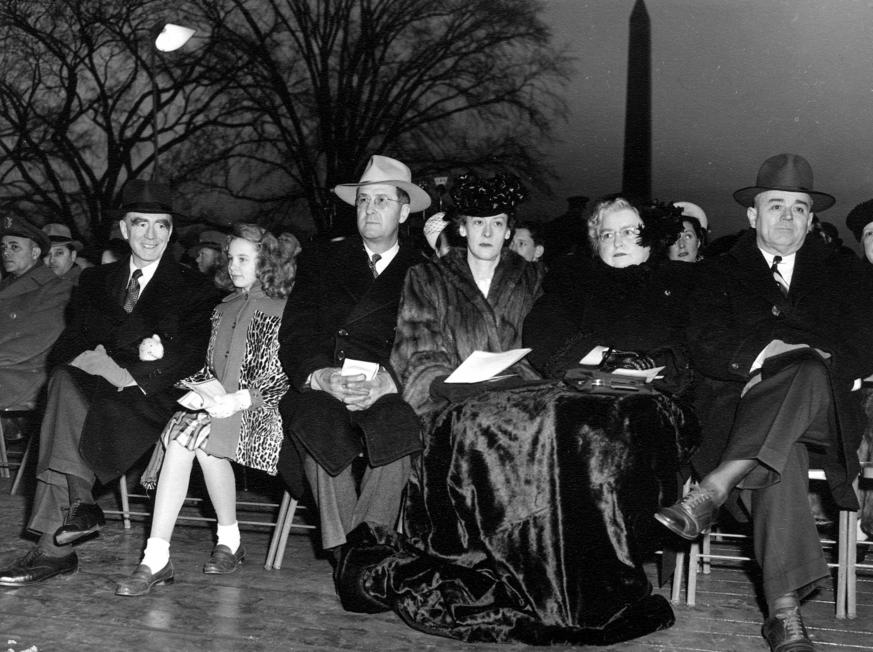
Clinton P. Anderson and wife Henrietta McCartney at the Christmas Tree Lighting Ceremony on the South Lawn of the White House (December 24, 1947).

Shortly after Harry S. Truman became president in 1945, he selected Anderson to serve as his Secretary of Agriculture. His most immediate concern was the reorganization of the domestic agricultural economy, which for the previous four years, had been focused on supporting the American war effort in the Second World War. Anderson addressed issues such as price controls, shortages, and subsidies, and he played an important role in developing postwar agricultural policies.

The domestic situation was only one of Anderson's concerns as Secretary of Agriculture. The looming worldwide food crisis, which was becoming more evident by 1946, led President Truman to establish the Famine Emergency Committee.

Anderson made two controversial moves to change the drastic problems. Firstly, he used his organizational skills to incorporate all existing food and agricultural activities under his office. Secondly, he advised Truman to enlist former President Herbert Hoover to serve as chairman of the Famine Emergency Committee. During the crisis, Anderson, Truman, and Hoover worked together very closely. Many of Hoover's proposals on alleviating the international food shortage were adopted by the Truman administration, and it became Anderson's responsibility to implement the proposals. The three men can be credited with preventing an even larger international disaster.

U.S. food production and worldwide distribution was stabilized by 1948, and Anderson decided to retire from the Cabinet. As with every project he had undertaken, Anderson left after he had resolved the problems faced.

=== U.S. Senate ===
==== Election ====
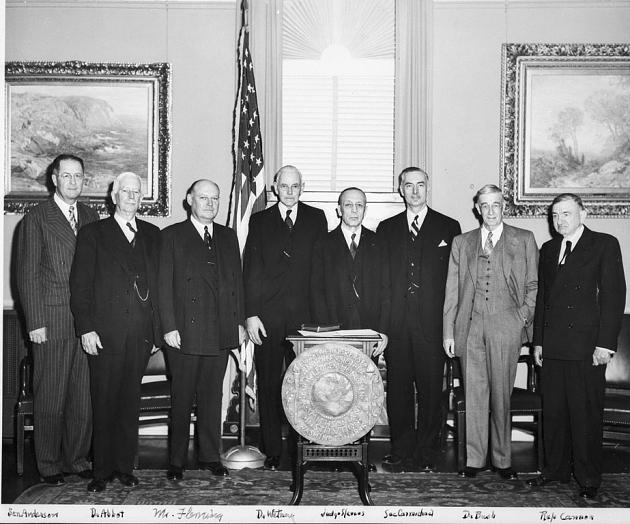
Attendees at the swearing in of Secretary of the Smithsonian Institution Leonard Carmichael in 1953. Senator Clinton P. Anderson is at left.

Anderson considered retiring altogether after resigning from the cabinet. However, state Democrats, led by retiring Senator Carl Hatch, convinced Anderson to run for Hatch's seat against the formidable and distinguished diplomat Patrick J. Hurley.

The two well-established candidates faced off in one of the most heated campaigns of the 1948 election. The nationwide campaigning of the Truman administration against an 'obstructionist' Republican Congress made Republicans lose across the country, including Hurley.

Anderson's re-election in 1954 against former Governor of New Mexico Edwin L. Mechem was less heated but more significant because the Democrats had lost the Senate in 1952. Anderson prevailed, with the Democrats regaining control of the Senate, and went on to be re-elected by wide margins in 1960 and 1966.

==== Accomplishments ====
Anderson sponsored the final wilderness bill, which passed the Senate by a vote of 73–12 on April 9, 1963, passed the House of Representatives by a 373–1 vote on July 30, 1964, and was signed into law by President Lyndon B. Johnson on September 3, 1964. Richard McArdle, chief of the Forest Service from 1952 to 1962, remarked: "Without Clinton Anderson there would have been no Wilderness Law."

Anderson is also known for the Price-Anderson Nuclear Industries Indemnity Act, as well as for forcing cancellation of the 1954 Dixon-Yates contract with the AEC for power from the TVA for the city of Memphis.

Anderson also served as chairman of the Joint Committee on Atomic Energy (84th and 86th Congresses), Joint Committee on Construction of Building for Smithsonian (84th-92nd), Joint Committee on Navaho-Hopi Indians (84th-92nd), Special Committee on Preservation of Senate Records (85th and 86th, Committee on Interior and Insular Affairs (87th and 88th), Special Committee on National Fuel Policy (87th).

=== Blocking the confirmation of Lewis Strauss ===
In 1959, President Dwight D. Eisenhower nominated Lewis Strauss to serve as Secretary of Commerce. Previously, Strauss had served in numerous government positions in the administrations of Presidents Truman and Eisenhower. The previous 13 nominees for the Cabinet position had won Senate confirmation in an average of eight days. Because of both personal and professional disagreements, Anderson took up the cause to make sure that Strauss would not be confirmed by the Senate. Anderson found an ally in Senator Gale W. McGee on the Senate Commerce Committee, which had jurisdiction over Strauss's confirmation. During and after the Senate hearings, McGee charged Strauss with "a brazen attempt to hoodwink" the committee. After 16 days of hearings the committee recommended Strauss's confirmation to the full Senate by a vote of 9–8. In preparation for the floor debate on the nomination, the Democratic majority's main argument against the nomination was that Strauss's statements before the committee were "sprinkled with half truths and even lies... and that under rough and hostile questioning, [he] can be evasive and quibblesome."

Despite an overwhelming Democratic majority, the 86th United States Congress was not able to accomplish much of its agenda since the President had immense popularity and a veto pen. With the 1960 elections nearing, congressional Democrats sought issues on which they could conspicuously oppose the Republican administration. The Strauss nomination proved to be tailor-made.

Just after midnight on June 19, 1959, the Strauss nomination failed by a vote of 46–49. It marked only the eighth time in U.S. history that a Cabinet appointee had failed to be confirmed by the Senate.

=== Support for space program ===
During his tenure, Anderson was one of the most outspoken proponents of the U.S. space program. He was instrumental in gaining funding for the program while chairing the Senate Committee on Aeronautical and Space Sciences from 1963 to 1973. As chairman of the committee during the most active period of space exploration and the most important time of the space race, Anderson held a key policy-making role in Washington, not to mention the purse strings for NASA.

In 1967, Anderson chaired the Senate Committee on Aeronautical and Space Sciences that investigated the NASA Apollo 1 accident. Deputy Administrator Robert Seamans, Administrator James E. Webb, Manned Space Flight Administrator Dr. George E. Mueller, and Apollo Program Director Maj Gen Samuel C. Phillips were all called to testify before Anderson's committee, which also featured extensive questioning by Senator Walter Mondale.

== Personal life ==
On June 22, 1921, Anderson married the former Henrietta McCartney, and the couple returned home to Albuquerque. They had two children together: Sherburne Presba Anderson; and Nancy Anderson.

On January 3, 1973, due to his age and growing health problems, Anderson retired after having served four terms in the U.S. Senate.

On November 11, 1975, just two years later, Anderson died at his home in Albuquerque from a massive stroke, at the age of 80. He was buried at Fairview Memorial Park in Albuquerque. His wife, Henrietta McCartney Anderson, died nearly two decades later, on June 7, 1994, at the age of 94.

=== Legacy ===
In 1977, Anderson was posthumously inducted into the International Space Hall of Fame.

In the Tom Hanks miniseries From the Earth to the Moon (1998), which aired on HBO, Anderson was played by Mason Adams.

Non-profit organization positions
Preceded by Sydney Pascall	President of Rotary International; 1932–1933	Succeeded by John Nelson
Political offices
Preceded by Warren Graham	Treasurer of New Mexico; 1933–1934	Succeeded by James Connelly
Preceded by Claude R. Wickard	United States Secretary of Agriculture; 1945–1948	Succeeded by Charles F. Brannan
U.S. House of Representatives
Preceded by John J. Dempsey	Member of the U.S. House of Representatives from New Mexico's at-large congressional district 1941–1945	Succeeded by George Lusk
Party political offices
Preceded by Carl Hatch	Democratic nominee for U.S. Senator from New Mexico (Class 2); 1948, 1954, 1960, 1966	Succeeded by Jack Daniels
U.S. Senate
Preceded by Carl Hatch	U.S. Senator (Class 2) from New Mexico; 1949–1973; Served alongside: Dennis Chávez, Edwin L. Mechem, Joseph Montoya	Succeeded by Pete Domenici
Preceded by W. Sterling Cole	Chair of the Joint Atomic Energy Committee; 1955–1957	Succeeded by Carl T. Durham
Preceded by Carl T. Durham	Chair of the Joint Atomic Energy Committee; 1959–1961	Succeeded by Chet Holifield
Preceded by James E. Murray	Chair of the Senate Interior Committee; 1961–1963	Succeeded by Henry M. Jackson
Preceded by Robert S. Kerr	Chair of the Senate Space Committee; 1963–1973	Succeeded by Frank Moss
