= Chaumont =

Chaumont can refer to:

== Places ==
=== Belgium ===
- Chaumont-Gistoux, a municipality in the province of Walloon Brabant

=== France ===
- Chaumont-Porcien, in the Ardennes département
- Chaumont, Cher, in the Cher département
- Chaumont-le-Bois, in the Côte-d'Or département
- Arrondissement of Chaumont, in the Haute-Marne département
- Chaumont, Haute-Marne, in the Haute-Marne département (often simply referred to in English as "Chaumont, France")
  - Chaumont-Semoutiers Air Base, a former United States Air Force base
- Chaumont-la-Ville, in the Haute-Marne département
- Chaumont, Haute-Savoie, in the Haute-Savoie département
- Chaumont-sur-Loire, in the Loir-et-Cher département
  - Château de Chaumont, a castle built in the 10th century
- Chaumont-sur-Tharonne, in the Loir-et-Cher département
- Chaumont-d'Anjou, in the Maine-et-Loire département
- Chaumont-devant-Damvillers, in the Meuse département
- Chaumont-sur-Aire, in the Meuse département
- Chaumont-en-Vexin, in the Oise département
- Chaumont, Orne, in the Orne département
- Chaumont-le-Bourg, in the Puy-de-Dôme département
- Chaumont, Yonne, in the Yonne département

=== Italy ===
- Chaumont, the French name for Chiomonte, a comune in the Province of Turin

=== Switzerland ===
- Chaumont (Neuchâtel), a mountain in the canton of Neuchâtel

=== United States ===
- Chaumont, Kentucky, a ghost town in Edmonson County
- Chaumont, New York, a village in Jefferson County

== Surname ==
- Antoine-Martin Chaumont de La Galaizière (1697−1783), a French nobleman active at the court of Lorraine
- Jacques Chaumont (1934–2025), French politician
- Lambert Chaumont (c. 1630–1712), a Flemish composer
- Madeleine Chaumont (1896–1973), French mathematics teacher
- Seigneurs of Chaumont, a French noble title, in particular
  - Charles II d'Amboise, Seigneur de Chaumont, a French military commander in the Italian Wars

== Other uses ==
- 12281 Chaumont, an asteroid discovered in 1990
- Treaty of Chaumont, signed in Chaumont, Haute-Marne in March 1814
- USS Chaumont, former name of the hospital ship USS Samaritan (AH-10)
