= George House (Chaumont, New York) =

Historic house in New York, United States

- U.S. National Register of Historic Places
- Location within New York Location within the United States
- Location: Washington St., Chaumont, New York
- Coordinates: 44°3′57″N 76°8′5″W
- Area: less than one acre
- Built: 1885
- Architectural style: Queen Anne, American four-square
- MPS: Lyme MRA
- NRHP reference No.: 90001338
- Added to NRHP: September 6, 1990

George House is a historic home located at Chaumont in Jefferson County, New York. It was built between 1895 and 1902 and is a 2 1/2-story, three-bay square building, with a modern 1-story, one- by three-bay rear addition. The foundation and first floor are of Chaumont limestone with a second floor, verandah, and decorative detailing in wood. It follows an American Foursquare plan.

It was listed on the National Register of Historic Places in 1990.
