= 1960 United States Senate election in New Mexico =

- November 8, 1960
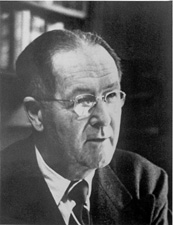

Nominee	Clinton Anderson	William F. Colwes
Party	Democratic	Republican
Popular vote	190,654	109,987
Percentage	63.43%	36.57%
- County results Anderson: 50–60% 60–70% 70–80% Colwes: 50–60%
U.S. senator before election
Clinton Anderson
Democratic
Elected U.S. Senator
Clinton Anderson
Democratic

The 1960 United States Senate election in New Mexico took place on November 8, 1960. Incumbent Democratic Senator Clinton Anderson won re-election to a third term.

== Primary elections ==
Primary elections were held on May 10, 1960.

=== Democratic primary ===
==== Candidates ====
- Clinton Anderson, incumbent U.S. Senator
- Mac J. Feldhake
- James P. Speer, businessman
- N. Tito Quintana, attorney

==== Results ====
Democratic primary results
Party	Candidate	Votes	%
Democratic	Clinton Anderson (incumbent)	98,037	81.33
Democratic	James P. Speer	9,360	7.77
Democratic	N. Tito Quintana	8,981	7.45
Democratic	Mac J. Feldhake	4,168	3.46
Total votes		120,546	

=== Republican primary ===
==== Candidates ====
- William F. Colwes, retired automobile dealer
- Joseph Rendon, unsuccessful candidate for Republican nomination for U.S. Senate in 1954
- Frederic W. Airy, advertising agent

==== Results ====
Republican primary results
Party	Candidate	Votes	%
Republican	William F. Colwes	18,884	53.03
Republican	Joseph Rendon	11,866	33.32
Republican	Frederic W. Airy	4,859	13.65
Total votes		35,609	

== General election ==
=== Results ===
1960 United States Senate election in New Mexico
Party	Candidate	Votes	%
Democratic	Clinton Anderson (Incumbent)	190,654	63.43
Republican	William Colwes	109,897	36.57
Majority		80,757	26.86
Turnout		300,551	
Democratic hold			

== See also ==
- 1960 United States Senate elections

== Bibliography ==
- Congressional Elections, 1946-1996. Washington, D.C.: Congressional Quarterly Inc. 1998. ISBN 1-56802-248-4.
