= Menzo Wheeler House =

Historic house in New York, United States

- U.S. National Register of Historic Places
- Location within New York Location within the United States
- Nearest city: 3 Mile Bay, New York
- Coordinates: 44°4′52″N 76°11′53″W
- Area: less than one acre
- Built: 1860
- Architectural style: 19th century eclectic
- MPS: Lyme MRA
- NRHP reference No.: 90001335
- Added to NRHP: September 6, 1990

Menzo Wheeler House is a historic home located at Chaumont in Jefferson County, New York. It was built in 1860 and is a 2 1/2-story, five-by-five-bay building with a heavy wooden frame on a limestone foundation.

It was listed on the National Register of Historic Places in 1990.
