= Chaumont station (New York) =

Historic railway station in New York, US

Chaumont

General information
- Location: Main Street, Chaumont, Jefferson County, New York 13622
- Line: Cape Vincent Branch

History
- Closed: 1952

Former services
Preceding station	New York Central Railroad	Following station
Three-Mile Bay toward Cape Vincent	Cape Vincent Branch	Watertown Terminus
- Chaumont Railroad Station
- U.S. National Register of Historic Places
- Location within New York Location within the United States
- Location: Main Street, Chaumont, New York
- Coordinates: 44°4′2″N 76°7′45″W
- Area: 1.5 acres (0.61 ha)
- Built: 1900
- MPS: Lyme MRA
- NRHP reference No.: 90001332
- Added to NRHP: September 6, 1990
Location

Chaumont station is a historic railway station located at Chaumont in Jefferson County, New York. It was built in about 1900 and is a one-story, one by six bay frame building on a low foundation of coursed limestone. It was built to serve the Cape Vincent Branch of the New York Central Railroad. It was last used as a railway station in 1952.

It was listed on the National Register of Historic Places in 1990 as the Chaumont Railroad Station.
