= United States Congressional Joint Committee on Atomic Energy =

U.S. congressional committee (1946-77)

The Joint Committee on Atomic Energy (JCAE) was a United States congressional committee that was tasked with exclusive jurisdiction over "all bills, resolutions, and other matters" related to civilian and military aspects of nuclear power from 1946 through 1977. It was established by the United States Atomic Energy Act of 1946, and was the overseer of the United States Atomic Energy Commission. It had been preceded by the Senate Special Committee on Atomic Energy, chaired by Senator Brien McMahon. For its broad powers, it is described as one of the most powerful congressional committees in U.S. history. It was the only permanent joint committee in modern times to have legislative authority.

The panel coupled these legislative powers with exclusive access to the information upon which its highly secretive deliberations were based. In particular its relations with the U.S. Department of Defense and the individual armed services were especially close. The joint committee was also entitled by statute to be kept "fully and currently informed" of all commission activities and vigorously exercised that statutory right, demanding information and attention from the executive branch in a fashion that arguably has no equivalent today.

During the early years of the Cold War, McMahon became the Senate's most prominent expert on atomic energy matters and as chairman exercised considerable influence towards increasing the focus on nuclear weapons as being essential to the American national interest. In this McMahon was aided by the executive director of the committee's staff, William L. Borden, who himself became a powerful figure. Senator Bourke Hickenlooper also served as chair during the early years of the committee and shared a similar sensibility. Indeed regardless of which party controlled the committee, the push for increased production of nuclear materials, and a resultant increase in the American nuclear stockpile, continued.

One major power wielded by the JCAE was the "Legislative Veto". This unique power enabled the JCAE to influence policy decisions while matters were pending. This enabled the JCAE to act as a co-decision maker with the executive branch rather than only providing congressional oversight of actions that had already occurred. The legislative veto power was later found to be unconstitutional by the United States Supreme Court in 1983.

This committee was the main opponent to the creation of the EPA. The Ash Council addressed its resistance to interference by proposing to only transfer over to the new agency the responsibilities of setting radiation standards outside of nuclear power plants.

The JCAE had various subcommittees including Agreements for Cooperation, Communities, Legislation, Military Application, National Security, Raw Materials, Radiation (Special), and Research and Development.

During the 1970s, the committee's role in shaping nuclear policy began to diminish after the Nuclear Regulatory Commission was created to replace the Atomic Energy Commission. Congress soon transferred the bulk of the joint committee's jurisdiction over civilian nuclear power to other standing congressional committees in the House and Senate. The joint committee was finally abolished on August 5, 1977.

== Prominent members ==
- Brien McMahon (D-CT), 1946–52: Senator who was legislative author of the Atomic Energy Act of 1946, chairman of the JCAE whenever Democrats controlled Congress (1946, and 1949–52), until his death. Chairman of the JCAE during detection of the first Soviet atomic bomb, the debate over the hydrogen bomb, and the discovery of Klaus Fuchs as a spy.
- Bourke Hickenlooper (R-IA), 1946–68: Ranking senator throughout much of its early history; chairman of the JCAE from 1947 to 1948. In 1949, he led a campaign accusing AEC chairman David E. Lilienthal of "incredible mismanagement" of the US nuclear complex.

== Committee members, 1946–1977 ==
The joint committee had equal representation between both the House and Senate, with 5 majority and 4 minority members from each house. The committee was chaired by a senator from the majority party until the 83rd Congress, when the chairmanship began to alternate between a majority representative and majority senator.

Historical membership

79th Congress, 1946

	Majority	Minority
Senate members	Brien McMahon, Connecticut, Chair; Richard Russell, Georgia; Tom Connally, Texas; Harry F. Byrd, Virginia	Arthur Vandenberg, Michigan; Eugene Millikin, Colorado; Bourke B. Hickenlooper, Iowa; William Knowland, California
House members	R. Ewing Thomason, Texas, Vice Chair; Carl T. Durham, North Carolina; Aime Forand, Rhode Island; Chet Holifield, California; Melvin Price, Illinois	Charles Elston, Ohio; J. Parnell Thomas, New Jersey; Carl Hinshaw, California; Clare Boothe Luce, Connecticut

80th Congress, 1947–1949

	Majority	Minority
Senate members	Bourke B. Hickenlooper, Iowa, Chair; Arthur Vandenberg, Michigan; Eugene Millikin, Colorado; William Knowland, California; John W. Bricker, Ohio	Brien McMahon, Connecticut; Richard Russell, Georgia; Edwin C. Johnson, Colorado; Tom Connally, Texas
House members	W. Sterling Cole, New York, Vice Chair; Charles Elston, Ohio; Carl Hinshaw, California; James E. Van Zandt, Pennsylvania; James T. Patterson, Connecticut	Carl T. Durham, North Carolina; Chet Holifield, California; Melvin Price, Illinois; Lyndon Johnson, Texas

81st Congress, 1949–1951

	Majority	Minority
Senate members	Brien McMahon, Connecticut, Chair; Richard Russell, Georgia; Edwin C. Johnson, Colorado; Tom Connally, Texas; Millard Tydings, Maryland	Bourke B. Hickenlooper, Iowa; Eugene Millikin, Colorado; William Knowland, California; John W. Bricker, Ohio
House members	Carl T. Durham, North Carolina, Vice Chair; Chet Holifield, California; Melvin Price, Illinois; Paul J. Kilday, Texas; Henry M. Jackson, Washington	W. Sterling Cole, New York; Charles Elston, Ohio; Carl Hinshaw, California; James E. Van Zandt, Pennsylvania

82nd Congress, 1951–1953

	Majority	Minority
Senate members	Brien McMahon, Connecticut, Chair (until July 28, 1952); Richard Russell, Georgia; Edwin C. Johnson, Colorado; Lyndon Johnson, Texas; Clinton Anderson, New Mexico	Bourke B. Hickenlooper, Iowa; Eugene Millikin, Colorado; William Knowland, California; John W. Bricker, Ohio
House members	Carl T. Durham, North Carolina, Vice Chair; Acting Chair (from July 28, 1952); Chet Holifield, California; Melvin Price, Illinois; Paul J. Kilday, Texas; Henry M. Jackson, Washington	W. Sterling Cole, New York; Charles Elston, Ohio; Carl Hinshaw, California; James E. Van Zandt, Pennsylvania

83rd Congress, 1953–1955

	Majority	Minority
Senate members	Bourke B. Hickenlooper, Iowa, Vice Chair; Eugene Millikin, Colorado; William Knowland, California; John W. Bricker, Ohio; Guy Cordon, Oregon	Richard Russell, Georgia; Clinton Anderson, New Mexico; John Pastore, Rhode Island; Al Gore Sr., Tennessee
House members	W. Sterling Cole, New York, Chair; Carl Hinshaw, California; James E. Van Zandt, Pennsylvania; James T. Patterson, Connecticut; Thomas A. Jenkins, Ohio	Carl T. Durham, North Carolina; Chet Holifield, California; Melvin Price, Illinois; Paul J. Kilday, Texas

84th Congress, 1955–1957

	Majority	Minority
Senate members	Clinton Anderson, New Mexico, Chair; Richard Russell, Georgia; John Pastore, Rhode Island; Al Gore Sr., Tennessee; Henry M. Jackson, Washington	Bourke B. Hickenlooper, Iowa; Eugene Millikin, Colorado; William Knowland, California; John W. Bricker, Ohio
House members	Carl T. Durham, North Carolina, Vice Chair; Chet Holifield, California; Melvin Price, Illinois; Paul J. Kilday, Texas; John J. Dempsey, New Mexico	W. Sterling Cole, New York; Carl Hinshaw, California; James E. Van Zandt, Pennsylvania; James T. Patterson, Connecticut

85th Congress, 1957–1959

	Majority	Minority
Senate members	Clinton Anderson, New Mexico, Vice Chair; Richard Russell, Georgia; John Pastore, Rhode Island; Al Gore Sr., Tennessee; Henry M. Jackson, Washington	Bourke B. Hickenlooper, Iowa; William Knowland, California; John W. Bricker, Ohio; Henry Dworshak, Idaho
House members	Carl T. Durham, North Carolina, Chair; Chet Holifield, California; Melvin Price, Illinois; Paul J. Kilday, Texas; John J. Dempsey, New Mexico (until March 11, 1958); Wayne N. Aspinall, Colorado (from March 17, 1958)	W. Sterling Cole, New York (until December 1, 1957); James E. Van Zandt, Pennsylvania; James T. Patterson, Connecticut; Thomas A. Jenkins, Ohio; Craig Hosmer, California (from January 15, 1958)

86th Congress, 1959–1961

	Majority	Minority
Senate members	Clinton Anderson, New Mexico, Chair; Richard Russell, Georgia; John Pastore, Rhode Island; Al Gore Sr., Tennessee; Henry M. Jackson, Washington	Bourke B. Hickenlooper, Iowa; Henry Dworshak, Idaho; George Aiken, Vermont; Wallace F. Bennett, Utah
House members	Carl T. Durham, North Carolina, Vice Chair; Chet Holifield, California; Melvin Price, Illinois; Paul J. Kilday, Texas (until January 29, 1959); Wayne N. Aspinall, Colorado; Albert Thomas, Texas (from January 21, 1959)	James E. Van Zandt, Pennsylvania; Craig Hosmer, California; William H. Bates, Massachusetts; Jack Westland, Washington

87th Congress, 1961–1963

	Majority	Minority
Senate members	John Pastore, Rhode Island, Vice Chair; Richard Russell, Georgia; Clinton Anderson, New Mexico; Al Gore Sr., Tennessee; Henry M. Jackson, Washington	Bourke B. Hickenlooper, Iowa; Henry Dworshak, Idaho (until July 23, 1962); George Aiken, Vermont; Wallace F. Bennett, Utah; Everett Dirksen, Illinois (from July 31, 1962)
House members	Chet Holifield, California, Chair; Melvin Price, Illinois; Wayne N. Aspinall, Colorado; Albert Thomas, Texas; Thomas G. Morris, New Mexico	James E. Van Zandt, Pennsylvania; Craig Hosmer, California; William H. Bates, Massachusetts; Jack Westland, Washington

88th Congress, 1963–1965

	Majority	Minority
Senate members	John Pastore, Rhode Island, Chair; Richard Russell, Georgia; Clinton Anderson, New Mexico; Al Gore Sr., Tennessee; Henry M. Jackson, Washington	Bourke B. Hickenlooper, Iowa; George Aiken, Vermont; Wallace F. Bennett, Utah; Everett Dirksen, Illinois (until February 11, 1963); Carl Curtis, Nebraska (from February 11, 1963)
House members	Chet Holifield, California, Vice Chair; Melvin Price, Illinois; Wayne N. Aspinall, Colorado; Albert Thomas, Texas; Thomas G. Morris, New Mexico	James E. Van Zandt, Pennsylvania; William H. Bates, Massachusetts; Jack Westland, Washington; John B. Anderson, Illinois

89th Congress, 1965–1967

	Majority	Minority
Senate members	John Pastore, Rhode Island, Vice Chair; Richard Russell, Georgia; Clinton Anderson, New Mexico; Al Gore Sr., Tennessee; Henry M. Jackson, Washington	Bourke B. Hickenlooper, Iowa; George Aiken, Vermont; Wallace F. Bennett, Utah; Carl Curtis, Nebraska
House members	Chet Holifield, California, Chair; Melvin Price, Illinois; Wayne N. Aspinall, Colorado; Albert Thomas, Texas (until February 15, 1966); Thomas G. Morris, New Mexico; John Young, Texas (from March 1, 1966)	Craig Hosmer, California; William H. Bates, Massachusetts; John B. Anderson, Illinois; William McCulloch, Ohio

90th Congress, 1967–1969

	Majority	Minority
Senate members	John Pastore, Rhode Island, Chair; Richard Russell, Georgia; Clinton Anderson, New Mexico; Al Gore Sr., Tennessee; Henry M. Jackson, Washington	Bourke B. Hickenlooper, Iowa; George Aiken, Vermont; Wallace F. Bennett, Utah; Carl Curtis, Nebraska
House members	Chet Holifield, California, Vice Chair; Melvin Price, Illinois; Wayne N. Aspinall, Colorado; Thomas G. Morris, New Mexico; John Young, Texas	Craig Hosmer, California; William H. Bates, Massachusetts; John B. Anderson, Illinois; William McCulloch, Ohio

91st Congress, 1969–1971

	Majority	Minority
Senate members	John Pastore, Rhode Island, Vice Chair; Richard Russell, Georgia; Clinton Anderson, New Mexico; Al Gore Sr., Tennessee; Henry M. Jackson, Washington	George Aiken, Vermont; Wallace F. Bennett, Utah; Carl Curtis, Nebraska; Norris Cotton, New Hampshire
House members	Chet Holifield, California, Chair; Melvin Price, Illinois; Wayne N. Aspinall, Colorado; John Young, Texas; Ed Edmondson, Oklahoma	Craig Hosmer, California; William H. Bates, Massachusetts (until June 22, 1969); John B. Anderson, Illinois; William McCulloch, Ohio; Catherine Dean May, California (from July 24, 1969)

92nd Congress, 1971–1973

	Majority	Minority
Senate members	John Pastore, Rhode Island, Chair; Richard Russell, Georgia (until January 21, 1971); Clinton Anderson, New Mexico; Henry M. Jackson, Washington; Stuart Symington, Missouri (from January 28, 1971); Alan Bible, Nevada	George Aiken, Vermont; Wallace F. Bennett, Utah; Carl Curtis, Nebraska (until February 4, 1971); Norris Cotton, New Hampshire (until February 10, 1971); Peter H. Dominick, Colorado (from February 10, 1971); Howard Baker, Tennessee (from February 10, 1971)
House members	Melvin Price, Illinois, Vice Chair; Chet Holifield, California; Wayne N. Aspinall, Colorado; John Young, Texas; Ed Edmondson, Oklahoma	Craig Hosmer, California; William H. Bates, Massachusetts; John B. Anderson, Illinois; William McCulloch, Ohio; Orval Hansen, Idaho

93rd Congress, 1973–1975

	Majority	Minority
Senate members	John Pastore, Rhode Island, Vice Chair; Henry M. Jackson, Washington; Stuart Symington, Missouri; Alan Bible, Nevada (until December 17, 1974); Joseph Montoya, New Mexico	George Aiken, Vermont; Wallace F. Bennett, Utah; Peter H. Dominick, Colorado; Howard Baker, Tennessee
House members	Melvin Price, Illinois, Chair; Chet Holifield, California (until December 13, 1974); John Young, Texas; Teno Roncalio, Wyoming; Mike McCormack, Washington; John E. Moss, California (from December 13, 1974)	Craig Hosmer, California; John B. Anderson, Illinois; Orval Hansen, Idaho; Manuel Lujan Jr., New Mexico

94th Congress, 1975–1977

	Majority	Minority
Senate members	John Pastore, Rhode Island, Chair; Henry M. Jackson, Washington; Stuart Symington, Missouri; Joseph Montoya, New Mexico; John V. Tunney, California	Howard Baker, Tennessee; Clifford P. Case, New Jersey; James B. Pearson, Kansas; James L. Buckley, New York
House members	Melvin Price, Illinois, Vice Chair; John Young, Texas; Teno Roncalio, Wyoming; Mike McCormack, Washington; John E. Moss, California	John B. Anderson, Illinois; Manuel Lujan Jr., New Mexico; Frank Horton, New York; Andrew J. Hinshaw, California

95th Congress, 1977

	Majority	Minority
Senate members	Henry M. Jackson, Washington, Vice Chair	
House members	Vacant, Chair	

== Staff members ==
- William L. Borden, executive director of staff, 1949–1953: Unusually powerful and influential staff figure who advocated for nuclear weapons development in the United States government. Most known for sending a letter that led to the Oppenheimer security hearing.

== See also ==
- Immigration and Naturalization Service v. Chadha
