= Chaumont House =

Historic house in New York, United States

- U.S. National Register of Historic Places
- Location within New York Location within the United States
- Location: Main St., Chaumont, New York
- Coordinates: 44°4′8″N 76°8′19″W
- Area: 1.8 acres (0.73 ha)
- Built: 1806
- Architectural style: Federal
- MPS: Lyme MRA
- NRHP reference No.: 90001341
- Added to NRHP: September 6, 1990

The Chaumont House is a historic house located in Chaumont, Jefferson County, New York.

== Description and history ==
It was built between 1806 and 1820, and consists of a 2 1/2-story, five-by-three-bay Federal style main block of limestone, with a 1 1/2-story three-by-two-bay lateral wood-frame wing. Also on the property are a contributing carriage house and garage.

It was listed on the National Register of Historic Places on September 6, 1990.
