= George Brothers Building =

Historic commercial building in New York, United States

- U.S. National Register of Historic Places
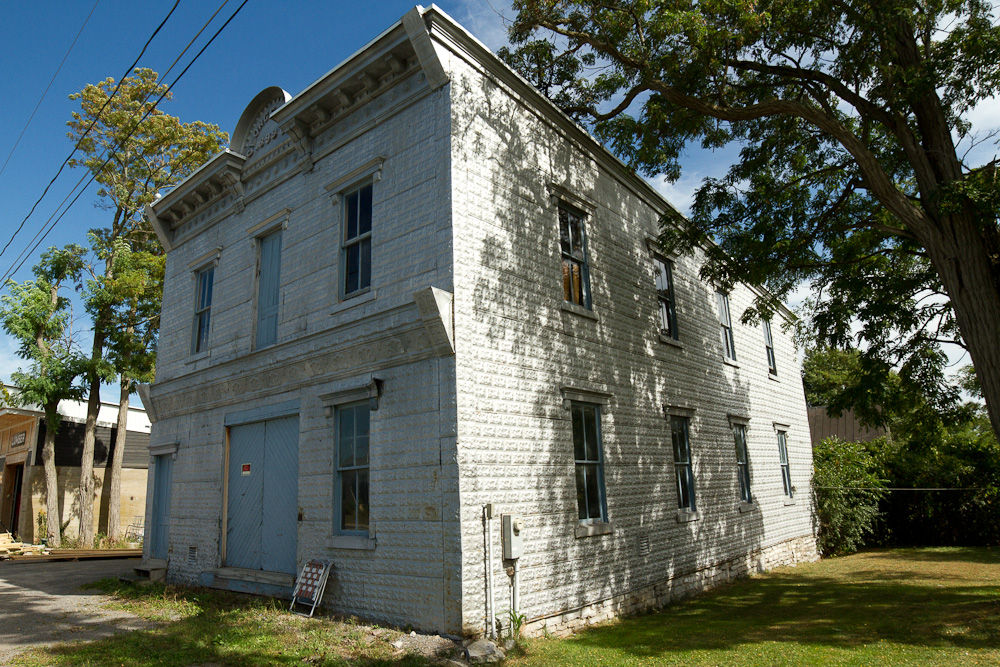

- Location within New York Location within the United States
- Location: Mill St., Chaumont, New York
- Coordinates: 44°3′56″N 76°7′47″W
- Area: less than one acre
- Built: 1899
- MPS: Lyme MRA
- NRHP reference No.: 90001334
- Added to NRHP: September 6, 1990

George Brothers Building is a historic warehouse located at Chaumont in Jefferson County, New York. It was built in 1899 and is a two-story, three by four bay wood-frame building on a low foundation of coursed limestone. It was built of prefabricated galvanized metal sheathing.

It was listed on the National Register of Historic Places on September 6, 1990.

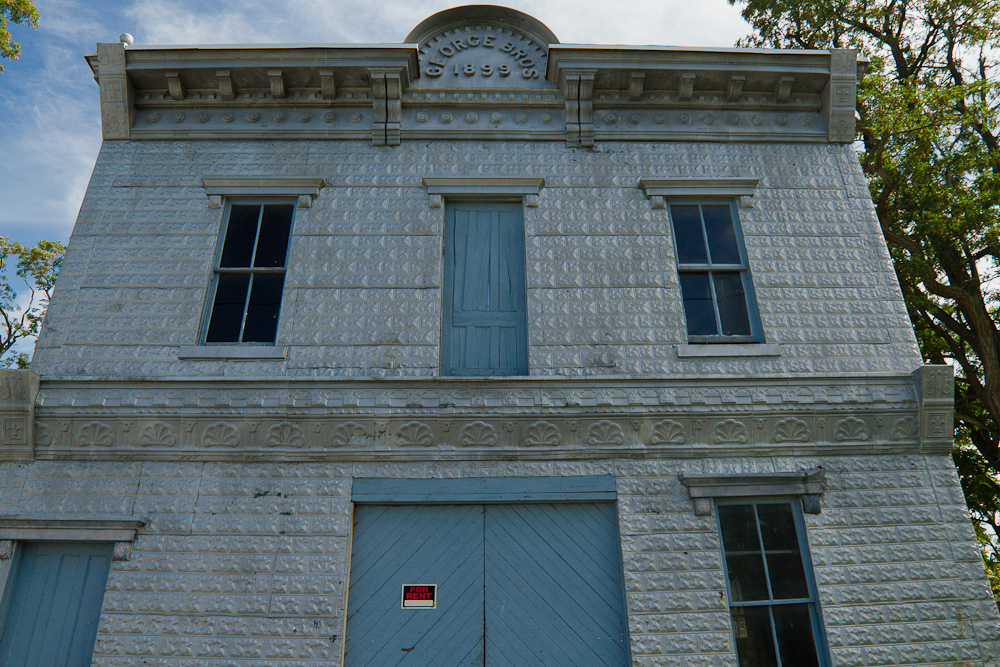
George Brothers Building
