= Ida Heiberger =

American physician (1858–1938)

Ida Johanna Heiberger M. D.
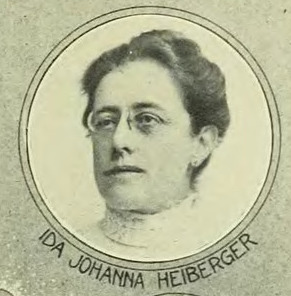
- Heiberger
- Born: February 4, 1858; Washington, D.C., U.S.
- Died: June 16, 1938 (aged 80); Washington, D.C., U.S.
- Education: Woman's Medical College of Pennsylvania
- Occupation: Physician

Ida Johanna Heiberger (February 4, 1858 – June 16, 1938) was an American physician and one of the first women licensed to practice medicine in Washington, D.C.

== Early life and education ==
Helberger was born on February 4, 1858, in Washington, D.C., to parents Emma J. and Francis (originally Franz) J. Heiberger. Her father worked as a merchant tailor and military outfitter for the United States Army and Navy, with a shop on 15th Street across the street from the U.S. Treasury.

Heiberger graduated from the Woman's Medical College of Pennsylvania in Philadelphia, in 1885, and her diploma and medical license are both in the National Museum of American History of the Smithsonian Institution.

She did postgraduate work in Freiberg and Leipzig, Germany; Zurich, Switzerland; and Vienna, Austria, before returning to Washington, D.C., to practice medicine. She received her medical license from the District of Columbia Medical Society in 1887. A contemporary newspaper lists her as a graduate of the University of Leipzig in Germany, and through her family it is likely that she was fluent in German.

In addition to the many English-language newspapers that reported on her work, articles about her appeared in The Washington Journal, a German language newspaper.

== Career ==
In 1887, Helberger accepted the invitation of Jeannette Judson Sumner and returned to Washington, D.C., from Europe early in order to join Sumner's practice, known as the Women's Dispensary. The Dispensary was founded by fellow physicians Sumner and Annie Elmira Rice in 1883 to serve mostly lower-income women of color.

Clinics of the day were segregated, and when Helberger left about a year later she founded the Woman's Clinic, serving lower-income white women and children who were unable afford traditional health care. She worked in the clinic for 47 years until her death. The clinic reported 3,165 patients in 1895, and it included prominent women on its board such as Mary Parsons and Julia E. Smith.

Heiberger's sister Minnie served on the board and was the clinic's treasurer. Lauretta E. Kress, a prominent obstetrician and the first woman to practice medicine in Montgomery County, Maryland, ran the clinic and served as its president in Heiberger's later years. There is evidence that they later also opened a separate clinic at 1237 T Street NW serving women of color, with Heiberger as its superintendent while Kress ran the original clinic.

Heiberger was encouraged and funded in some of her work by U.S. Treasurer Francis E. Spinner, a man whom the New York Medical Journal of 1891 cited as a strong proponent women's health care.

Heiberger served as the surgeon general of the Ladies of the Spanish War Veterans, and she was affiliated with the Young Women's Home and the Young Women's Christian Association (YWCA). During the Spanish-American War (April 21 – August 13, 1898) she also served as the physician in charge of The Soldiers' Rest in Washington, D.C., a headquarters for visiting soldiers, many of whom were injured or unwell. In 1891, she was listed as dining with Clara Barton.

Helberger was involved in controversy in 1910 when, representing the Professional Women's League, she read a formal protest against a bill allowing George Washington University to receive money from the federal treasury, on the grounds that "women do not have equal opportunities with the men in the medical and other professional courses of the university," according to a newspaper account. She read her statement at a hearing before the Senate committee on Agriculture and Forestry.

== Personal life ==
Helberger lived in the Concord Apartment House at what was then the corner of New Hampshire Avenue and Oregon Streets in Washington, D.C., though that intersection no longer exists.

Newspapers reported her as the victim of a carriage accident at 14th and H Streets NW that put her in George Washington University Hospital and left her badly bruised. Early reports said she was thrown from the carriage, but later reports said not, although one wheel did break off the carriage.

Heiberger appears in the diaries of American physician and writer Elizabeth Kane, with evidence that their friendship spanned many years.

She was supporter of women's suffrage, and donated $5 to the expense fund of the national legislative committee at suffrage headquarters in 1913, an amount that is approximately equal to $300 in 2023.
