= Mary Spackman =

American physician

Mary Spackman (born in Maryland, US) was the first female medical student to graduate from Howard University in 1872.

Mary Spackman applied for a licence to practice medicine and for consultation privileges from the Medical Society of the District of Columbia in 1872 but was rejected because she was a woman, in 1874 she joined with another recent graduate Mary Almera Parsons to petition for a licence to practice medicine.
