= Chaumont Historic District =

Historic district in New York, United States

- U.S. National Register of Historic Places
- U.S. Historic district
- Location within New York Location within the United States
- Location: Along Main St., roughly between Washington and Church Sts., Chaumont, New York
- Coordinates: 44°4′4″N 76°8′0″W
- Area: 10 acres (4.0 ha)
- Built: 1835
- Architectural style: Mid 19th Century Revival, Late 19th And 20th Century Revivals, Late Victorian
- MPS: Lyme MRA
- NRHP reference No.: 90001336
- Added to NRHP: September 06, 1990

Chaumont Historic District is a national historic district located at Chaumont in Jefferson County, New York. The district includes 33 contributing buildings. District boundaries encompass 23 residences, one commercial building, one fraternal building, one church, and 15 associated outbuildings and objects.

It was listed on the National Register of Historic Places in 1990.
