= 1966 United States Senate election in New Mexico =

- November 8, 1966
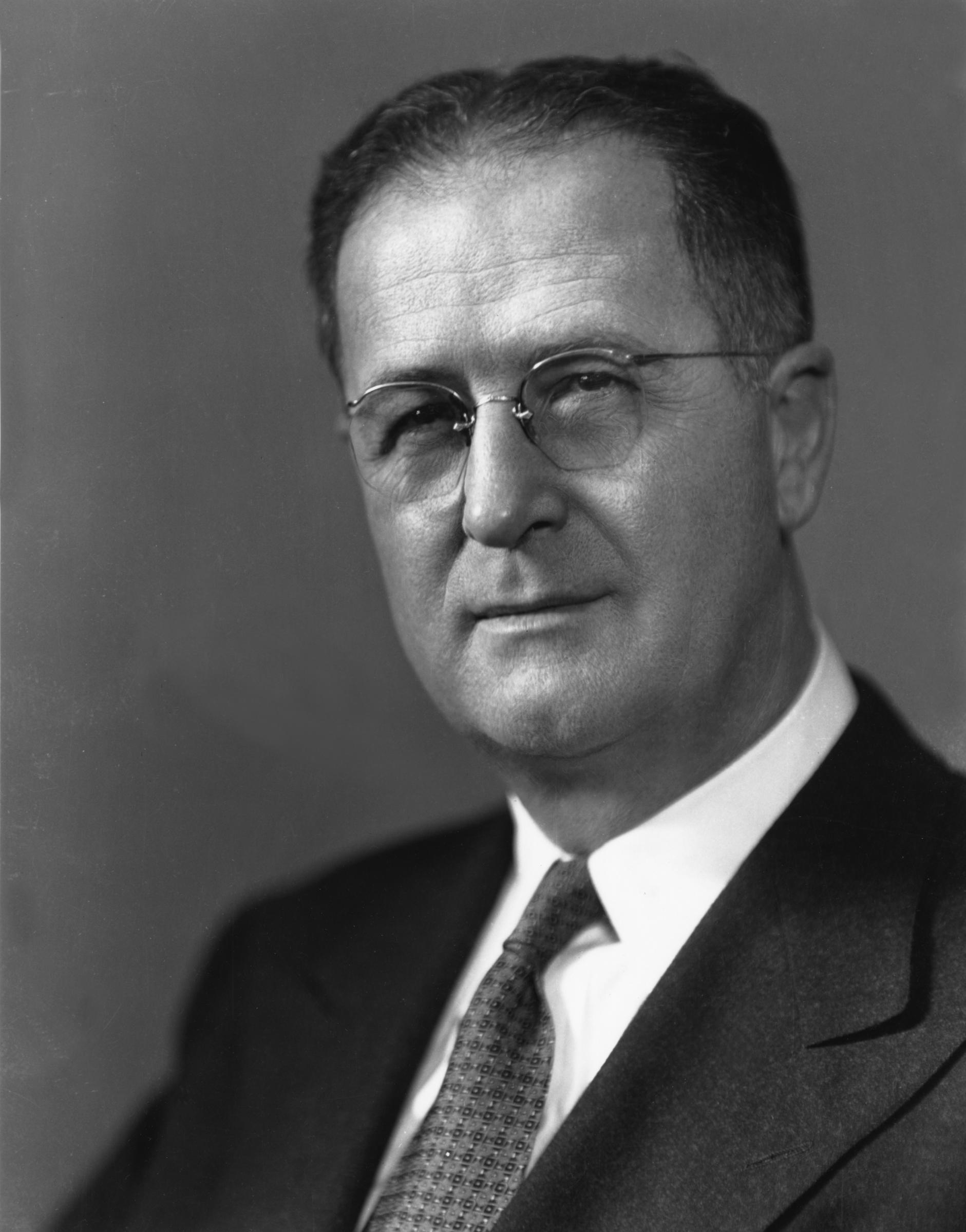

Nominee	Clinton Anderson	Anderson Carter
Party	Democratic	Republican
Popular vote	137,205	120,988
Percentage	53.14%	46.86%
- County results Anderson: 50–60% 60–70% Carter: 50–60% 60–70%
U.S. senator before election
Clinton Anderson
Democratic
Elected U.S. Senator
Clinton Anderson
Democratic

The 1966 United States Senate election in New Mexico was held on November 8, 1966. Incumbent Democratic U.S. Senator Clinton Anderson won re-election to a fourth term. Democrats would not win this seat again until 2008.

== Primary elections ==
Primary elections were held on May 3, 1966.

=== Democratic primary ===
==== Candidate ====
- Clinton Anderson, incumbent U.S. Senator

==== Results ====
Democratic Party primary results
Party	Candidate	Votes	%
Democratic	Clinton Anderson (incumbent)		unopposed

=== Republican primary ===
==== Candidate ====
- Anderson Carter, oilman and rancher and former State Representative

==== Results ====
Republican Party primary results
Party	Candidate	Votes	%
Republican	Anderson Carter		unopposed

== General election ==
=== Result ===
United States Senate election in New Mexico, 1966
Party	Candidate	Votes	%	±%
Democratic	Clinton Anderson (incumbent)	137,205	53.14%	
Republican	Anderson Carter	120,988	46.86%	
Total votes		258,193	100.00%	
Democratic hold				

== See also ==
- 1966 United States Senate elections

== Bibliography ==
- Congressional Elections, 1946-1996. Washington, D.C.: Congressional Quarterly Inc. 1998. ISBN 1-56802-248-4.
- Scammon, Richard M., ed. (1968). America Votes 7: a handbook of contemporary American election statistics, 1966. Washington, D.C.: Governmental Affairs Institute.
