= Chaumont Grange Hall and Dairymen's League Building =

- U.S. National Register of Historic Places
- Location within New York Location within the United States
- Location: Main St., Chaumont, New York
- Coordinates: 44°3′55″N 76°7′44″W
- Area: less than one acre
- Built: 1898
- MPS: Lyme MRA
- NRHP reference No.: 90001337
- Added to NRHP: September 6, 1990

Chaumont Grange Hall and Dairymen's League Building is a historic grange hall located at Chaumont in Jefferson County, New York. It was built in 1898 and is a 2 1/2-story, three by four bay frame building on a foundation of limestone and concrete blocks.

It was listed on the National Register of Historic Places in 1990.
