= Horace R. Kornegay =

American politician

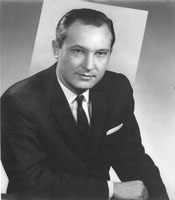

Member of the U.S. House of Representatives from North Carolina's 6th district
- In office January 3, 1961 – January 3, 1969
- Preceded by: Carl T. Durham
- Succeeded by: L. Richardson Preyer

Personal details
- Born: March 12, 1924 Asheville, North Carolina, U.S.
- Died: January 21, 2009 (aged 84) Greensboro, North Carolina, U.S.
- Party: Democratic
- Education: Wake Forest College

Horace Robinson Kornegay (March 12, 1924 – January 21, 2009) was a U.S. Representative from North Carolina.

Born in Asheville, North Carolina, Kornegay was educated in the public schools of Greensboro, North Carolina, graduating from Greensboro Senior High School (see Grimsley High School) in 1941. He attended Georgia School of Technology and graduated from Wake Forest College with a B.S., 1947, and an LL.B., 1949. He was admitted to the bar and entered the practice of law in Greensboro in 1949. He served in the United States Army in Company D, 397th Infantry Regiment, 100th Infantry Division from December 14, 1942, to February 1, 1946, with service in the European theatre of World War II and became a private first class. He served as assistant district solicitor from 1951 to 1953.

Kornegay was elected district solicitor (prosecuting attorney), for the twelfth district of North Carolina in 1954 and again in 1958. He served as a delegate to the 1964 Democratic National Convention.

Kornegay was elected as a Democrat to the Eighty-seventh and to the three succeeding Congresses (January 3, 1961 – January 3, 1969). He voted against the Civil Rights Act of 1964, but voted in favor of various progressive initiatives such as those related to tackling poverty. He did, however, vote against establishing Medicare.

He was not a candidate for reelection in 1968 to the Ninety-first Congress. He served as vice president and counsel (January 1969-June 1970), then president (June 1970-February 1981), and finally chairman (February 1982-December 1986), of the Tobacco Institute, Inc. He resumed the practice of law in Greensboro, North Carolina, in January 1987. He lived in Greensboro until his death in 2009, aged 84.

== Sources ==
- United States Congress. "Horace R. Kornegay (id: K000318)". Biographical Directory of the United States Congress.

U.S. House of Representatives
Preceded by Carl T. Durham	Member of the U.S. House of Representatives from North Carolina's 6th congressional district 1961–1969	Succeeded by L. Richardson Preyer
