= Carl T. Durham =

American politician

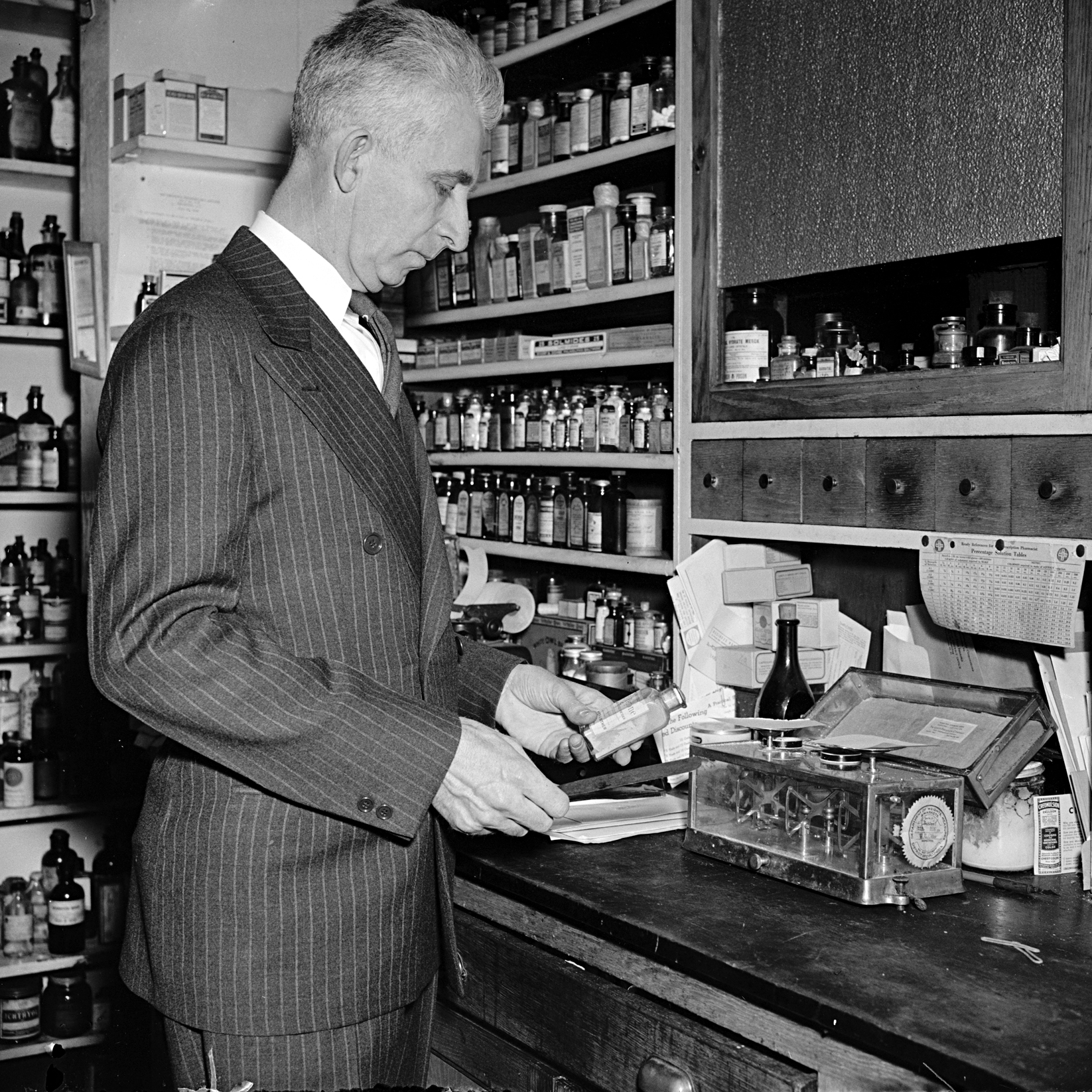

Member of the U.S. House of Representatives from North Carolina's 6th district
- In office January 3, 1939 – January 3, 1961
- Preceded by: William B. Umstead
- Succeeded by: Horace R. Kornegay

Personal details
- Born: Carl Thomas Durham; August 28, 1892 Orange County, North Carolina, U.S.
- Died: April 29, 1974 (aged 81) Durham, North Carolina, U.S.
- Party: Democratic
- Education: University of North Carolina at Chapel Hill
- Occupation: pharmacist

Carl Thomas Durham (August 28, 1892 – April 29, 1974) was an American politician who served as a member of the United States House of Representatives from North Carolina.

== Early life and education ==
Born in Orange County, North Carolina, Durham attended the University of North Carolina at Chapel Hill.

== Career ==
He was a pharmacist from 1912 to 1938. He served as a pharmacist's mate in the United States Navy from 1917 to 1918. He served as a member of the city council of Chapel Hill, North Carolina from 1924 to 1932, and of the Orange County Board of Commissioners 1932 to 1938. He served as a member of the school board of Chapel Hill, North Carolina from 1924 to 1938. He was also a trustee of the University of North Carolina.

Durham was elected as a Democrat to the Seventy-sixth and to the ten succeeding Congresses (January 3, 1939 – January 3, 1961). He served as chairman of the Joint Committee on Atomic Energy, during which time he was a signatory to the 1956 Southern Manifesto that opposed the desegregation of public schools ordered by the Supreme Court in Brown v. Board of Education. He was not a candidate for renomination in 1960 to the Eighty-seventh Congress. In 1964, retired and resided in Chapel Hill, North Carolina.

== Death ==
He died in Durham, North Carolina, April 29, 1974. He was interred in Antioch Baptist Church Cemetery, Chapel Hill, North Carolina.

== Sources ==
- United States Congress. "Carl T. Durham (id: D000571)". Biographical Directory of the United States Congress.

U.S. House of Representatives
| Preceded by William B. Umstead | Member of the U.S. House of Representatives from North Carolina's 6th congressional district 1939-1961 | Succeeded by Horace R. Kornegay |
