= Cedar Grove Cemetery (Chaumont, New York) =

Historic cemetery in New York, United States

- U.S. National Register of Historic Places
- Location within New York Location within the United States
- Location: Washington St., Chaumont, New York
- Coordinates: 44°3′51″N 76°8′2″W
- Area: 3.1 acres (1.3 ha)
- Built: 1873
- Architect: Copley, Hiram
- MPS: Lyme MRA
- NRHP reference No.: 90001324
- Added to NRHP: September 6, 1990

Cedar Grove Cemetery is a historic rural cemetery located at Chaumont in Jefferson County, New York. It is a small cemetery established in 1873 whose pronounced slopes entailed the use of terraced plots. Retaining walls are largely built of Chaumont limestone.

It was listed on the National Register of Historic Places in 1990.
