= Mary Almera Parsons =

American physician

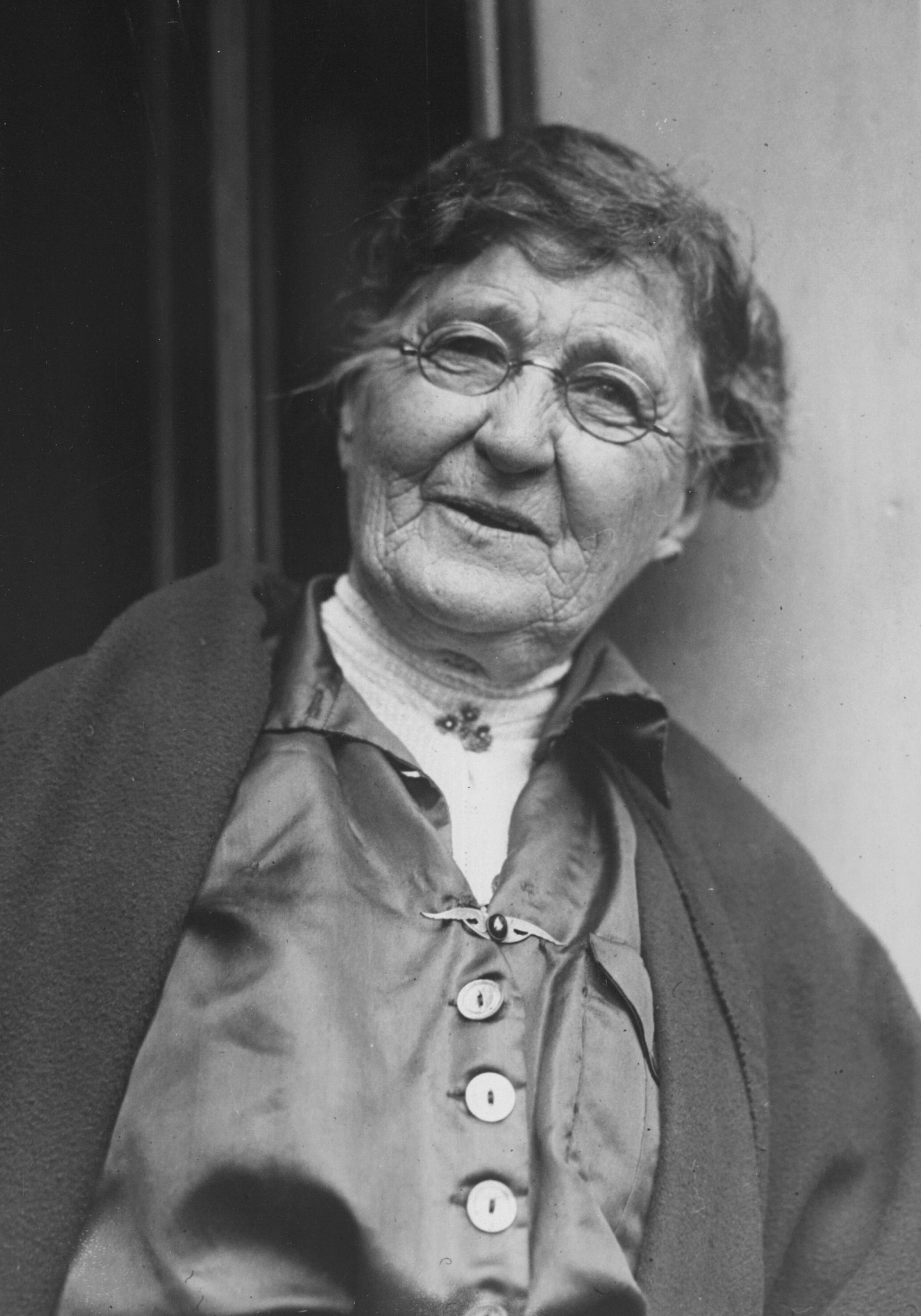
- Born: May 2, 1850; Colebrook
- Died: January 12, 1944 (aged 93)
- Alma mater: Howard University College of Medicine; Robinson Female Seminary
- Occupation: Medical doctor

Mary Almera Parsons (May 2, 1850 – January 12, 1944) was an American physician and activist who successfully petitioned for the Medical Society of the District of Columbia to grant medical licenses to women.

== Biography ==
In 1870, Parsons entered medical school at Howard University in Washington, D.C. In June 1874, she graduated from Howard University and applied for her license to practice medicine, along with fellow graduate Mary Spackman, but both were denied licenses due to their gender. With Isabel Haslup Lamb, Parsons founded Women's Medical Society of the District of Columbia.

Flodoardo Howard, the president of the Medical Society of the District of Columbia, was pressured in to forming a committee to discuss the issue of granting women medical licenses. Samuel Claggett Busey was invited to be in the committee but declined, as he knew the majority of the members were opposed to women practicing medicine. Busey would go on to become the president of the Medical Society of the District of Columbia and he was a supporter of Mary Almera Parsons' application. J. Ford Thompson encouraged Parsons to appeal to the federal government to amend the charter and allow women to obtain medical licenses.

On January 14, 1875, Parsons petitioned the United States Congress to amend the society's charter, and on March 3, 1875, the bill was approved. Despite this, the Medical Society refused her membership for the following three years, which prevented her from obtaining consultation privileges, and so denied her equality with male doctors. During this period, the support for female doctors was growing, and several state and local medical societies began accepting female members and awarding them consultation privileges in 1878. Parsons' application to the medical society was approved in October 1888. In 1901, Parsons became the first female vice-president of the Medical Society, and in 1915, became the vice-president of the Association of Southern Medical Women.
