= Medical Society of the District of Columbia =

Medical society in Washington D.C., US (e. 1817)

Coordinates: 38.90615°N 77.05054°W

- Merged into: Society (1911)
- Formation: 1817
- Founded at: Washington, D.C.
- Key people: Mary Almera Parsons

Medical Society of the District of Columbia is an American medical society that supports physicians in Washington, D.C.

== History ==
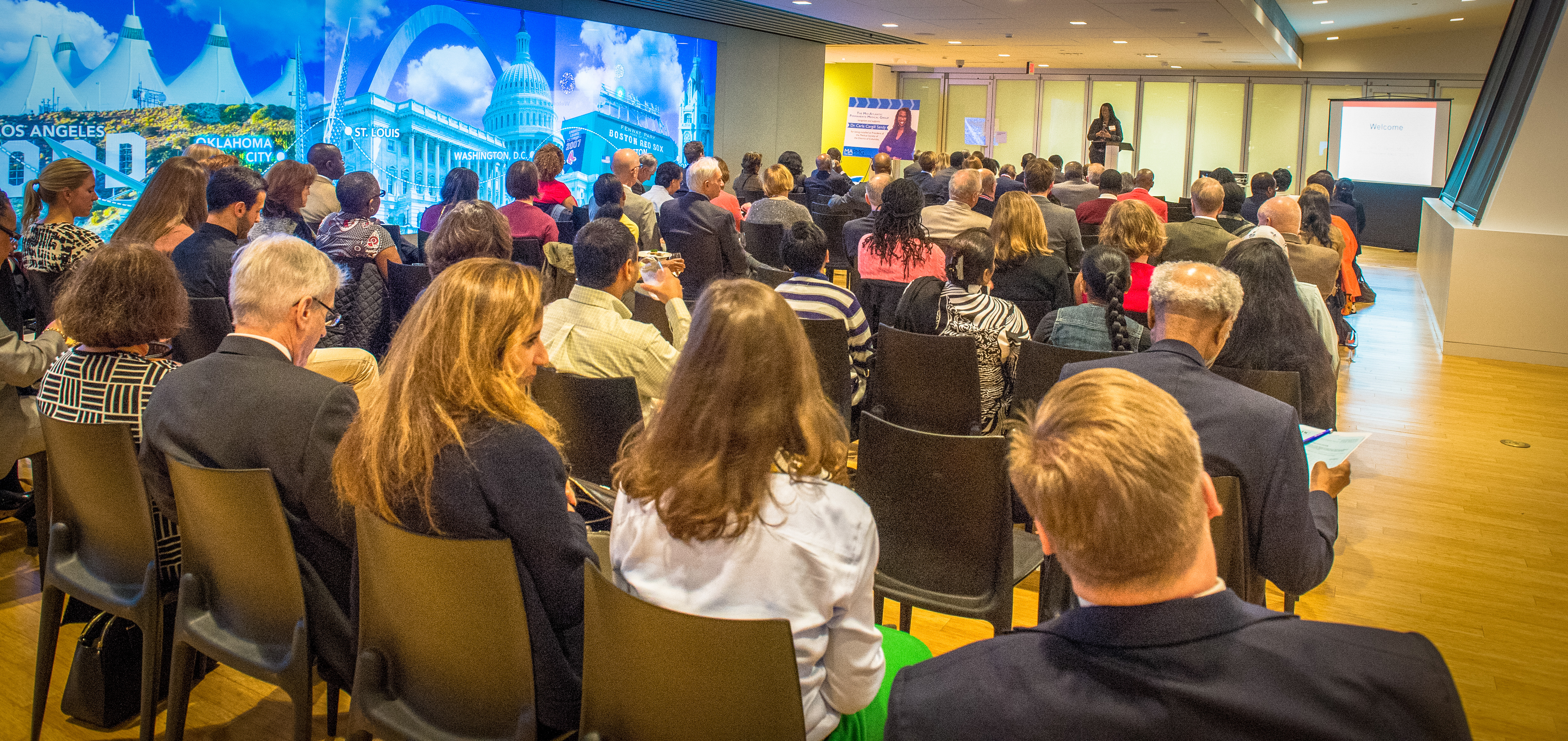
Carla Sandy, the Medical Society of the District of Columbia's 2015–16 president, addresses attendees at the society's annual meeting on October 28, 2015

Medical Society of the District of Columbia was founded in 1817 and was the 12th medical society to be formed in the United States, and the first medical society in the country to be chartered by an Act of Congress, and was given the authority to license physicians in D.C. to practice medicine. "The presence of quackery in this District lay at the foundation of the original formation of the Society." The Society endeavored to keep the public informed of the legitimacy of the qualifications of physicians, and decided that obtaining Congressional authority would improve the Society's ability to perform this function.

The Medical Association of the District of Columbia, an organization which performed several complementary professional functions involving setting ethical standards and procedures for disciplining members, merged with the Society in 1911.

In 1872, Mary Spackman graduated from the medical department at Howard University and applied for a licence to practice medicine but was refused because she was a woman, she then applied again with a fellow graduate Mary Almera Parsons, but both were rejected. In 1875, Mary Almera Parsons appealed to the Federal Government and petitioned congress to amend the charter and allow women to obtain licences to practice medicine, and on the 3rd March 1875 the bill was approved. After the charter amendment, the first woman member of the Society was not admitted for thirteen more years. Dr. Parsons applied for membership annually in the three years following the amendment's passage, and was voted down each time. She became the first woman member of the society in 1888, following her fourth application.

== Executive committee ==
- Desiree Pineda - President
- Susanne Bathgate - Chair of the Board of Directors
- E.W. Emanuel - President-Elect
- Kirstiaan Nevin - Secretary
- Raymond Tu - Treasurer
