= Chaumont, New York =

- Village
- Location within New York Location within the United States
- Coordinates: 44°4′2″N 76°8′2″W
- Country: United States
- State: New York
- County: Jefferson
- Town: Lyme
- Incorporation: 1874
- Named after: Jacques-Donatien Le Ray de Chaumont

Government
  - Mayor: Valerie E. Rust

Area
  - Total: 1.08 sq mi (2.79 km^{2})
  - Land: 0.98 sq mi (2.55 km^{2})
  - Water: 0.093 sq mi (0.24 km^{2})
- Elevation: 289 ft (88 m)

Population (2020)
  - Total: 615
  - Density: 625.4/sq mi (241.45/km^{2})
- Time zone: UTC-5 (Eastern (EST))
  - Summer (DST): UTC-4 (EDT)
- ZIP code: 13622
- Area code: 315
- FIPS code: 36-14036
- GNIS feature ID: 0969990
- Website: https://www.villageofchaumont.gov/

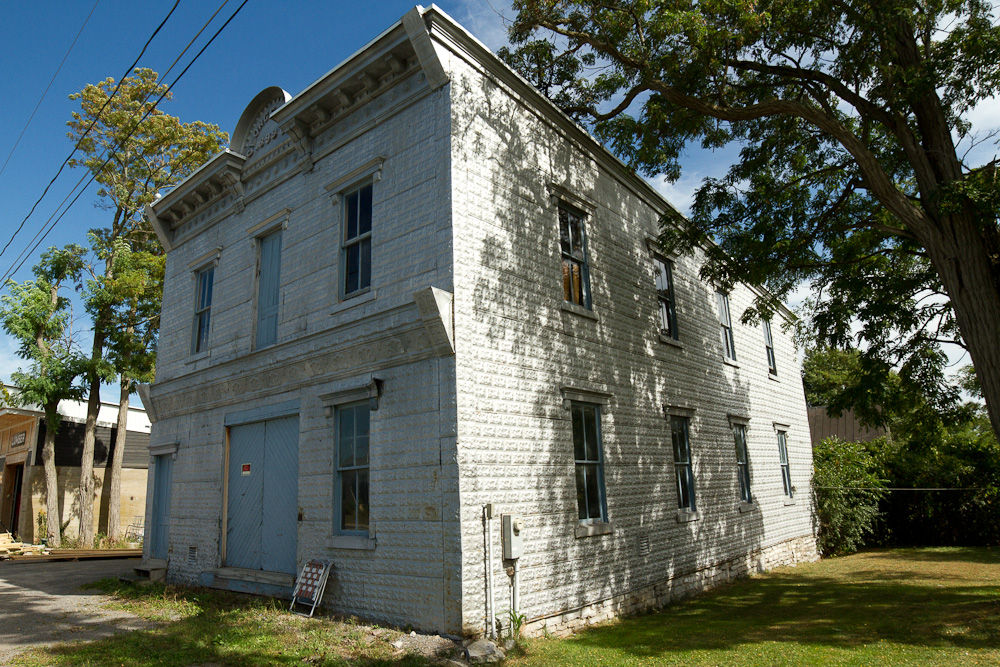
George Brothers Building in Chaumont

Chaumont (/ʃəˈmoʊ/ shə-MOH) is a village in Jefferson County, New York, United States. As of the 2020 census, Chaumont had a population of 615. The village is named for Jacques-Donatien Le Ray de Chaumont, son of Benjamin Franklin's landlord and friend at Passy in France. The village of Chaumont is in the town of Lyme and is northwest of Watertown.

== History ==
In 1750, Ray had bought the Chaumont castle (named from the Old French for "bald hill", and built in two periods around 1500) in the Loire Valley of France. (As of 2009, the village near it is called Chaumont-sur-Loire to distinguish it from the many other Chaumonts in France.) His son, known as James Leray or James Leray Chaumont, travelled to the United States and later settled there.

The first European-descended settlement of the village began in 1802, replacing an unsatisfactory site chosen the previous year. The economy of the early village was based on fishing and ship building.

In July 1853, the community contained about fifty dwellings, along with other structures. Chaumont was incorporated as a village in 1874, and its historic core was listed on the National Register of Historic Places in 1990 as the Chaumont Historic District. The village has twice been proposed to be dissolved into the surrounding town of Lyme. The first dissolution referendum was defeated by a margin of 129–72 in March 1999; a second attempt was rejected by a 145–102 margin on November 6, 2012.

In addition to the Chaumont Historic District, the Cedar Grove Cemetery, Chaumont Grange Hall and Dairymen's League Building, Chaumont House, Chaumont Railroad Station, George Brothers Building, George House, and Menzo Wheeler House are listed on the National Register of Historic Places.

== Geography ==
Chaumont is in the west-central part of Jefferson County, in the northeastern portion of the town of Lyme. According to the United States Census Bureau, the village has a total area of 1.1 square miles (2.8 km^{2}), of which 0.97 square miles (2.5 km^{2}) are land and 0.1 square miles (0.2 km^{2}), or 8.78%, are water.

The village is on the south side of the Chaumont River, where it empties into Chaumont Bay, an arm of Lake Ontario. Much of the village is on a peninsula, which ends at Independence Point.

New York State Route 12E passes through the village as Main Street. The highway leads southeast 13 miles (21 km) to Watertown, the county seat, and northwest 12 miles (19 km) to Cape Vincent on the St. Lawrence River. County Route 179 (Evans Street) enters the village from the northeast and leads 6 miles (10 km) to Depauville.

== Climate ==
In 2008 the average precipitation for Chaumont was below the United States average in the months of January through July, and above the United States average in the months of August through December, reaching an average of 4 inches (100 mm) in September. Snowfall is well above the United States average in the months of October through April, reaching 28 to 30 inches (710 to 760 mm) in January.

== Demographics ==
Historical population
Census	Pop.	Note	%±
1870	370		—
1880	479		29.5%
1890	623		30.1%
1900	738		18.5%
1910	708		−4.1%
1920	595		−16.0%
1930	596		0.2%
1940	534		−10.4%
1950	513		−3.9%
1960	523		1.9%
1970	567		8.4%
1980	620		9.3%
1990	593		−4.4%
2000	592		−0.2%
2010	624		5.4%
2020	615		−1.4%
U.S. Decennial Census

As of the census of July 2009, there were 638 people, up 7.8% since 2000. 46.8%(298) of residents were male and 53.2%(340) were female. The median resident age at this time was 38.8 years. The 2000 census recorded 592 people, 233 households, and 143 families residing in the village. The population density was 578.2 inhabitants per square mile (223.2/km^{2}). There were 273 housing units at an average density of 266.6 per square mile (102.9/km^{2}). The racial makeup of the village was 96.79% White, 1.69% African American, 0.68% Native American, and 0.84% from two or more races. Hispanic or Latino of any race were 1.01% of the population.

There were 233 households, out of which 30.5% had children under the age of 18 living with them, 47.6% were married couples living together, 11.2% had a female householder with no husband present, and 38.2% were non-families. 33.0% of all households were made up of individuals, and 19.7% had someone living alone who was 65 years of age or older. The average household size was 2.48 and the average family size was 3.22.

In the village, the population was spread out, with 25.0% under the age of 18, 9.8% from 18 to 24, 27.0% from 25 to 44, 22.6% from 45 to 64, and 15.5% who were 65 years of age or older. The median age was 39 years. For every 100 females, there were 87.9 males. For every 100 females age 18 and over, there were 80.5 males.

The estimated median household income was $50,471 in 2008. In 2000 the income was estimated to be $37,750 and the median income for a family was $49,107. Males had a median income of $34,375 versus $26,000 for females. The per capita income for the village was $16,608. About 1.6% of families and 8.4% of the population were below the poverty line, including 4.2% of those under age 18 and 9.5% of those age 65 or over.

== Education ==
The school district is the Lyme Central School District.
