= Annie Elmira Rice =

American physician (1852–1884)

Annie E. Rice
- Born: July 4, 1852; Hallowell, Maine, U.S.
- Died: January 11, 1884 (aged 31); Washington, D.C., U.S.
- Education: Woman's Medical College of Pennsylvania
- Known for: One of the first two women to enter medical school at Georgetown University.

Annie E. Rice (1852–1884) was an American medical doctor, and, with Jeannette Judson Sumner, was one of the first two women to attend Georgetown University Medical School, 89 years before Georgetown formally admitted women.

== Early life and education ==
She was born in Hallowell, Maine, to Almira W. Sampson Rice and Elisha Esty Rice. She was born into a prominent family, as her father was a colonel, the first US presidential consul to Japan, and the inventor of railway brakes and other innovations discussed at length in Scientific American.

Rice and "Nettie" Sumner enrolled in Georgetown's medical program, and they began their coursework in the autumn of 1880. In 1881, they both transferred to the Woman's Medical College of Pennsylvania (WMCP), graduating with medical degrees in 1883. Rice's thesis at WMCP was on "Elytrorrhaphy as performed by Le Fort." Joseph Taber Johnson MD, of the obstetrics faculty of Georgetown University Medical Center, published an editorial in the Maryland Medical Journal endorsing her new application of Le Fort's procedure, and recommending her thesis for publication.

== Work with Alexander Graham Bell ==
The year before the two women began their medical studies at Georgetown University, Sumner wrote to Alexander Graham Bell discussing in detail how she and Rice both volunteered in Bell's laboratory on 1325 L Street NW. They heard a song and listened to his voice on the telephone that he had patented four years earlier. It is clear from the context of the letter that Bell requested it of Sumner. That same season the women also worked on Fayette Street in Georgetown (now 35th Street) at Bell's Volta Bureau office, alongside an inventor and engineer named Sumner Tainter, who was a close collaborator of Bell's.

== Work as a physician and early death ==
After graduating from medical school in Pennsylvania, Rice and Sumner returned to Washington, D.C., in June 1883. Together they opened the city's first free clinic for women, and called it the Woman's Dispensary. Their type of patient-centered care set a new standard for women's health, and they were also able to offer clinical experience for other woman doctors who were graduating. Clinics were strictly segregated in those years, so they opened one at 937 New York Avenue to care for women of color.

Rice died in 1884 at age 31, and cause was listed in the Maryland Medical Journal as heart disease. She died three years before Sumner recruited Ida Heiberger in 1887. When Rice served the only doctors were women, but Sumner eventually extended the practice to include male students and residents, and eventually leading to conflict with Heiberger, a change that Rice did not live to see.
