= Jeannette Judson Sumner =

American physician (1846–1906)

- Born: November 15, 1846; Constantine, Michigan
- Died: November 12, 1906 (aged 59); Washington DC
- Education: Woman's Medical College of Pennsylvania
- Occupation: Doctor
- Known for: 19th-century physician, and one of the first two women to study at Georgetown University.

Jeannette "Nettie" Judson Sumner (November 15, 1846 – November 12, 1906) is one of the first two women known to have studied at Georgetown University, or at any Jesuit university, 89 years before Georgetown formally admitted women.

== Early life and education ==
Sumner was born in Constantine, Michigan to Hester Ann Welling and Watson Sumner, MD. Her father was the town physician, and an "overseer of the poor" through his civic work. She lived in Brooklyn, New York in 1870 with her mother, her brother Rear Admiral George Watson Sumner, and his first wife Henrietta Eliza. The Sumners were a prominent family, and George was a graduate of the United States Naval Academy, a veteran of the American Civil War and the Spanish American War, and a member of the Sons of the American Revolution. By 1880, Nettie Sumner lived with them and several nieces and nephews in Washington, DC at the time of her enrollment at Georgetown.

Nettie J. Sumner and Annie Elmira Rice enrolled in Georgetown's Medical Department, beginning school in the fall of 1880. In 1881, both students transferred to the Woman's Medical College of Pennsylvania (WMCP), where they completed their medical degrees in 1883. Sumner's thesis at WMCP was on Hystero-trachelorrhaphy. She also published an article on "A puzzling case of uterine disease" in 1882, presented to the WMCP alumni association in Philadelphia in 1886.

== Work with Alexander Graham Bell ==
The winter and spring before starting medical school at Georgetown University, Sumner wrote a letter to Alexander Graham Bell documenting how Sumner and Rice both volunteered in his laboratory at 1325 L Street NW to listen to a song and his voice on the new telephone (patented four years earlier). It reads as though he requested it from her, and the full, handwritten copy is available at the Library of Congress. That season she also worked at Bell's Volta Bureau office in Georgetown, Washington, DC alongside engineer and inventor Sumner Tainter, one of Bell's close collaborators, transcribing his experiments and explaining complex concepts.

== Work as a medical doctor ==
Physicians Sumner and Rice returned to Washington, DC together in June of 1883 after graduating from medical school in Pennsylvania, and opened the city's first free clinic for women operated by women doctors. The patient-centered care at the Woman's Dispensary set a new model for women's health care in the nation's capital, and offered clinical experience for the growing number of women doctors entering the field. They opened the clinic at 937 New York Avenue, and primarily served women of color.

Sumner kept the clinic going after the untimely death of her friend and business partner Dr. Rice in 1884. She was well connected to social leaders in the city, who helped fund the work. She recruited Ida Heiberger in 1887. Male doctors and medical students began joining the staff, with residency opportunities throughout the city in short supply, and Sumner forced to succumb to pressures from her powerful male-dominated consulting board. This step away from the clinic's original mission caused conflict and may have led to its eventual demise. Heiberger left in 1889 and established the Woman's Clinic, more in line with the Dispensary's founding principles, limiting staff appointments to only women doctors, and serving health needs of only women and young children.

== Later years and death ==
In 1896, Sumner entered St. Elizabeth's Hospital, then known as the Government Hospital for the Insane. Her recorded condition was blindness. She died there in 1906 and is buried at Rock Creek Cemetery in Washington, DC.
