= Jacques Chaumont =

French politician (1934–2025)

Member of the French Senate for Sarthe
- In office 25 September 1977 – 30 September 2004

Deputy of the French National Assembly for Sarthe's 2nd constituency
- In office 11 July 1968 – 6 October 1977
- Preceded by: Robert Manceau
- Succeeded by: Daniel Boulay

Member of the General Council of Sarthe for the Canton of Le Grand-Lucé
- In office 1979–2004
- Preceded by: Christian Pineau
- Succeeded by: Régis Vallienne

Personal details
- Born: 17 November 1934; Le Mans, France
- Died: 6 February 2025 (aged 90)
- Political party: UDR; RPR; UMP

Jacques Chaumont (17 November 1934 – 6 February 2025) was a French politician of the Union of Democrats for the Republic (UDR), the Rally for the Republic (RPR), and the Union for a Popular Movement (UMP).

Chaumont represented the Canton of Le Grand-Lucé in the General Council of Sarthe from 1979 to 2004. Nationally, he represented Sarthe's 2nd constituency in the National Assembly from 1968 to 1977 and served Sarthe in the Senate from 1977 to 2004.

Chaumont died on 6 February 2025, at the age of 90.
