= List of snakes of Oklahoma =

This is a list of snakes found in the U.S. state of Oklahoma.

== Snakes of Oklahoma ==
Non-venomous snakes

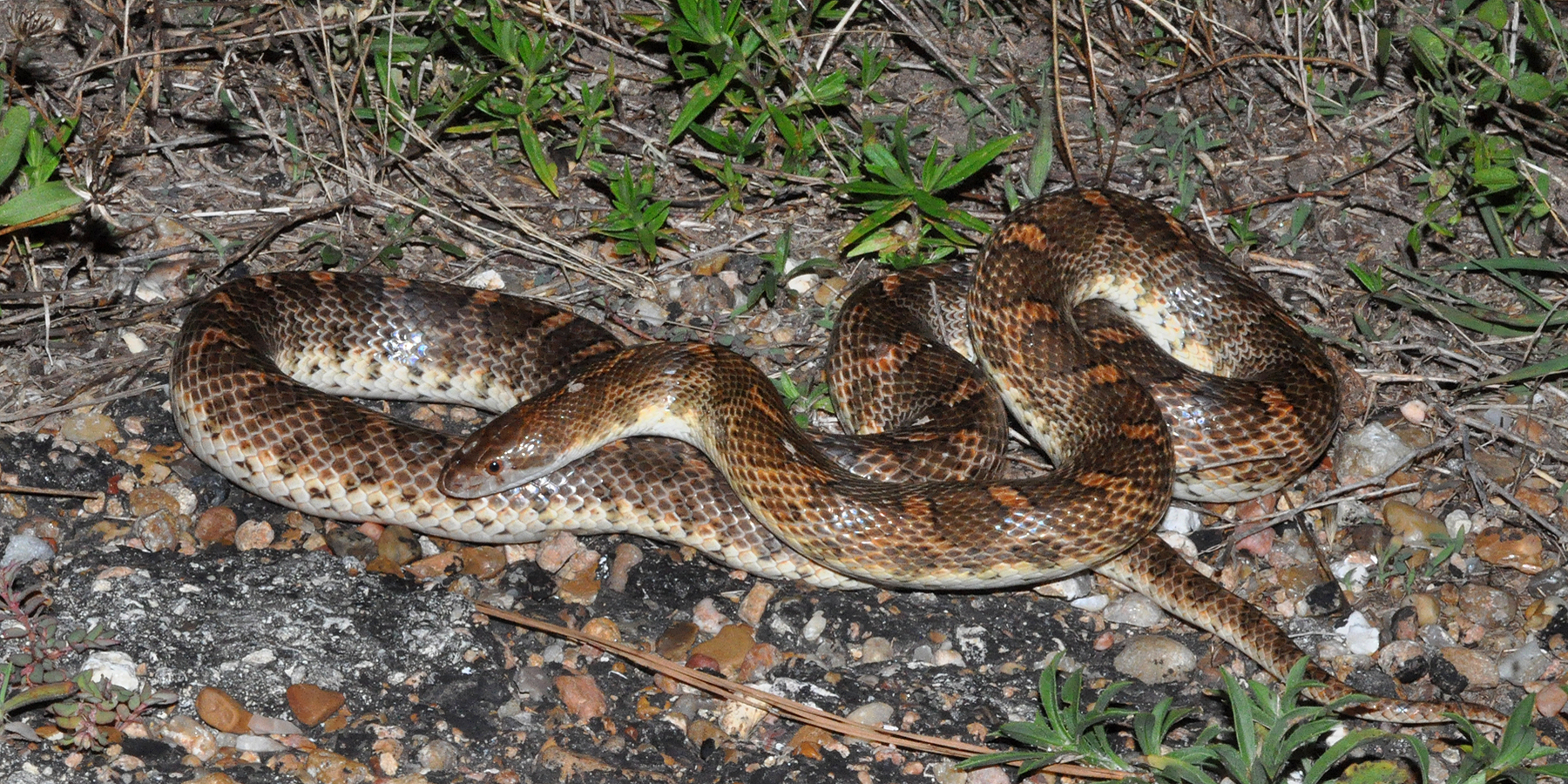
- Arizona elegans—glossy snake
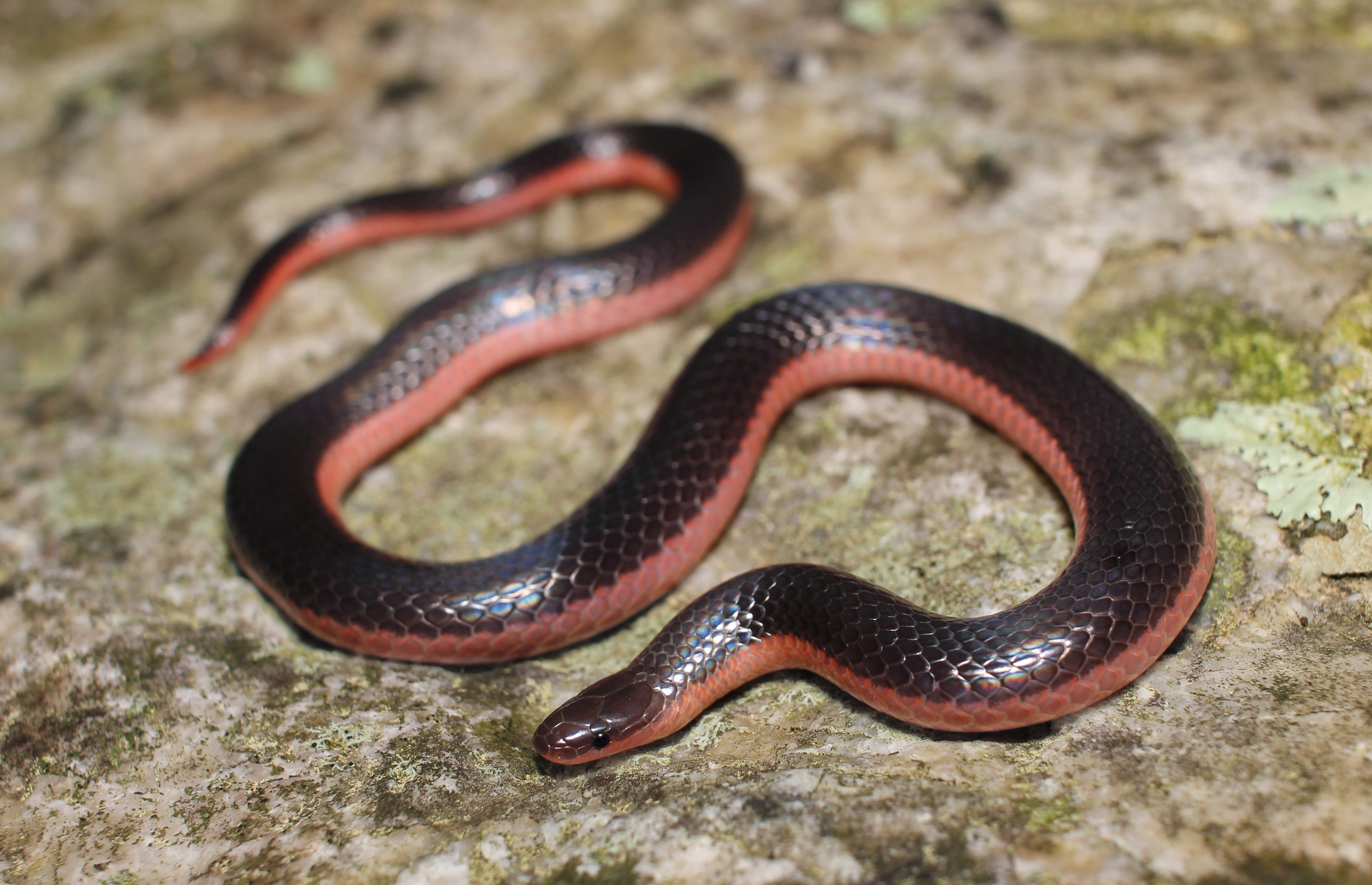
- Carphophis vermis—western worm snake
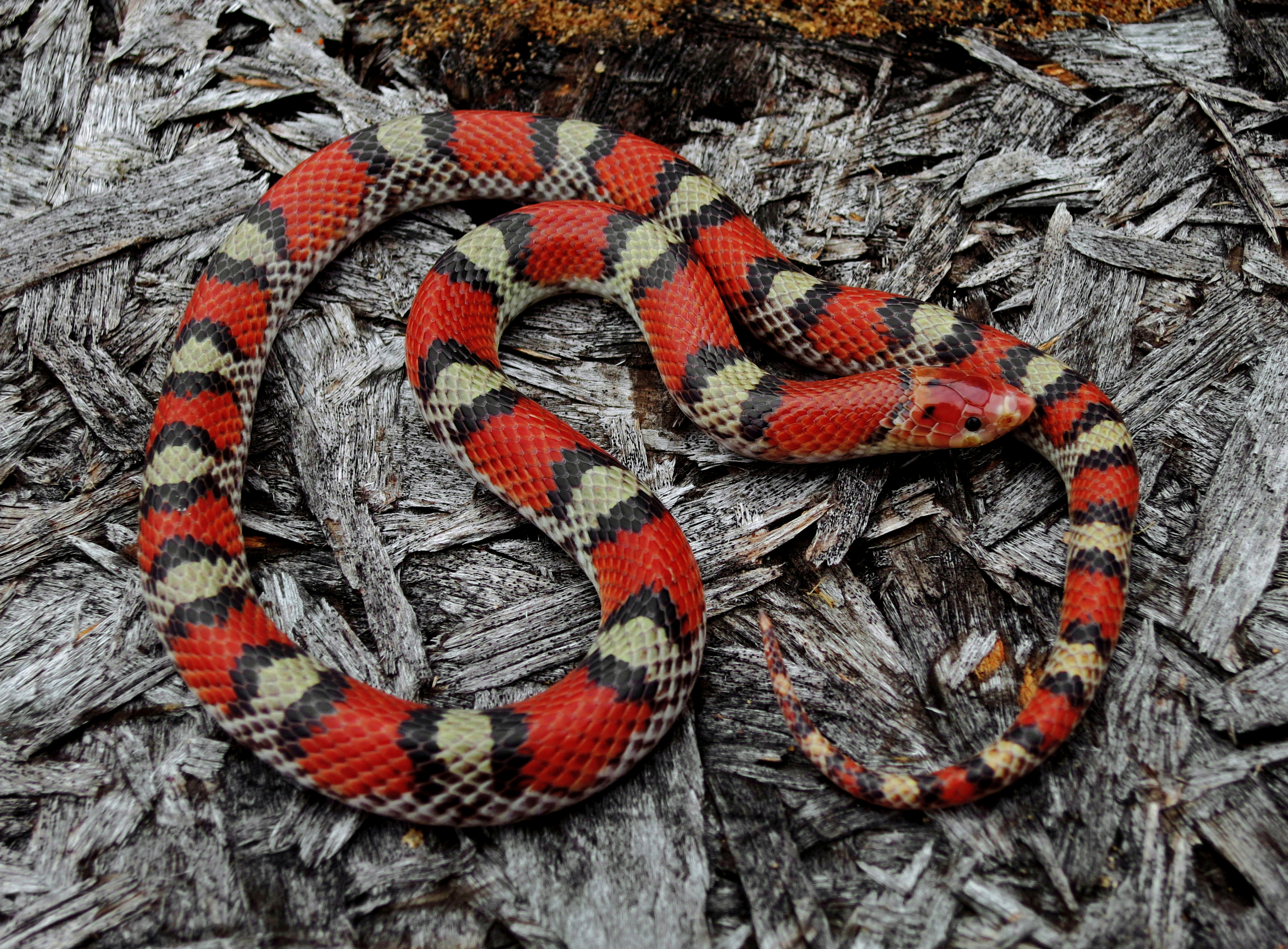
- Cemophora coccinea—scarlet snake
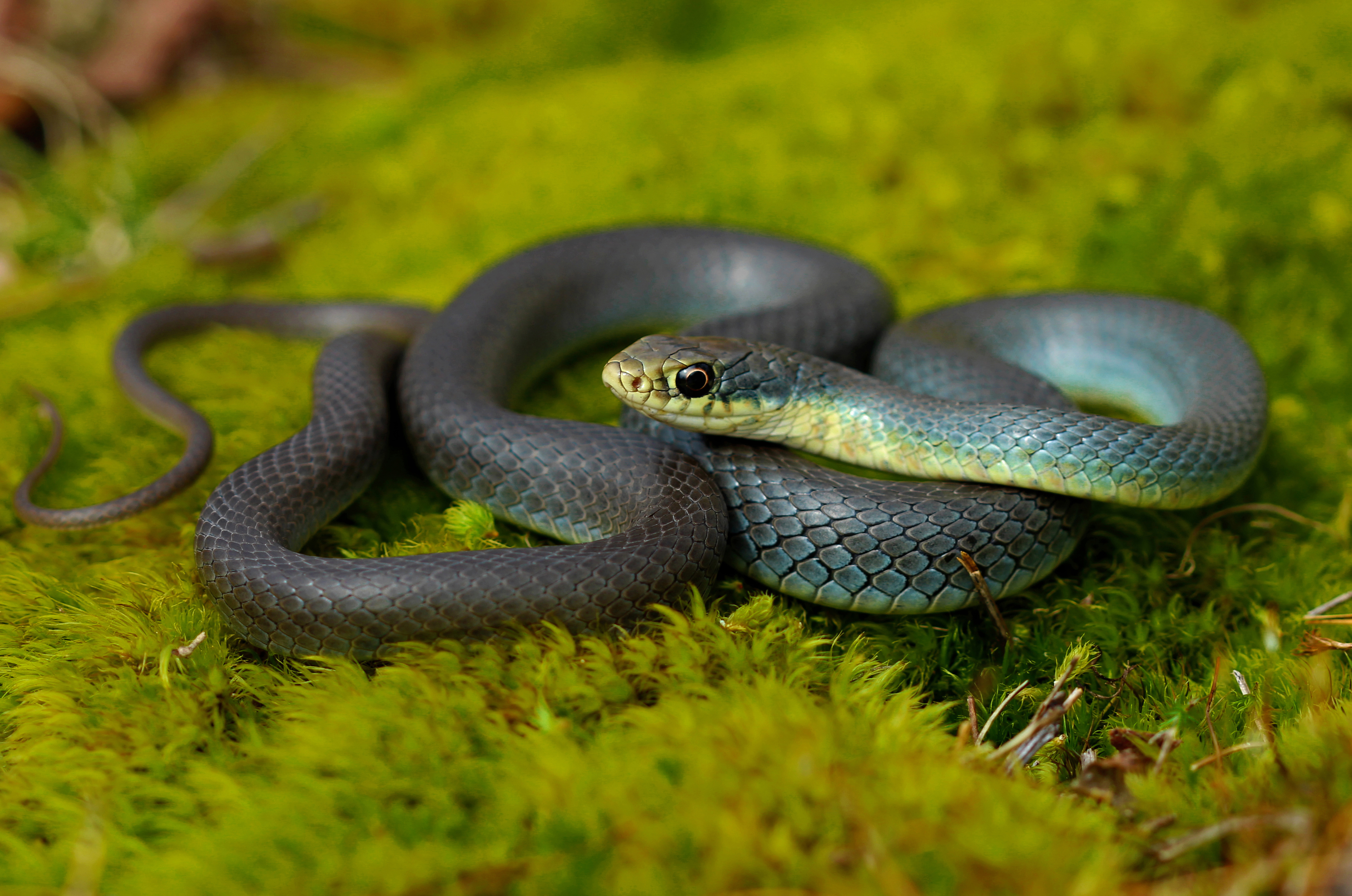
- Coluber constrictor—racer
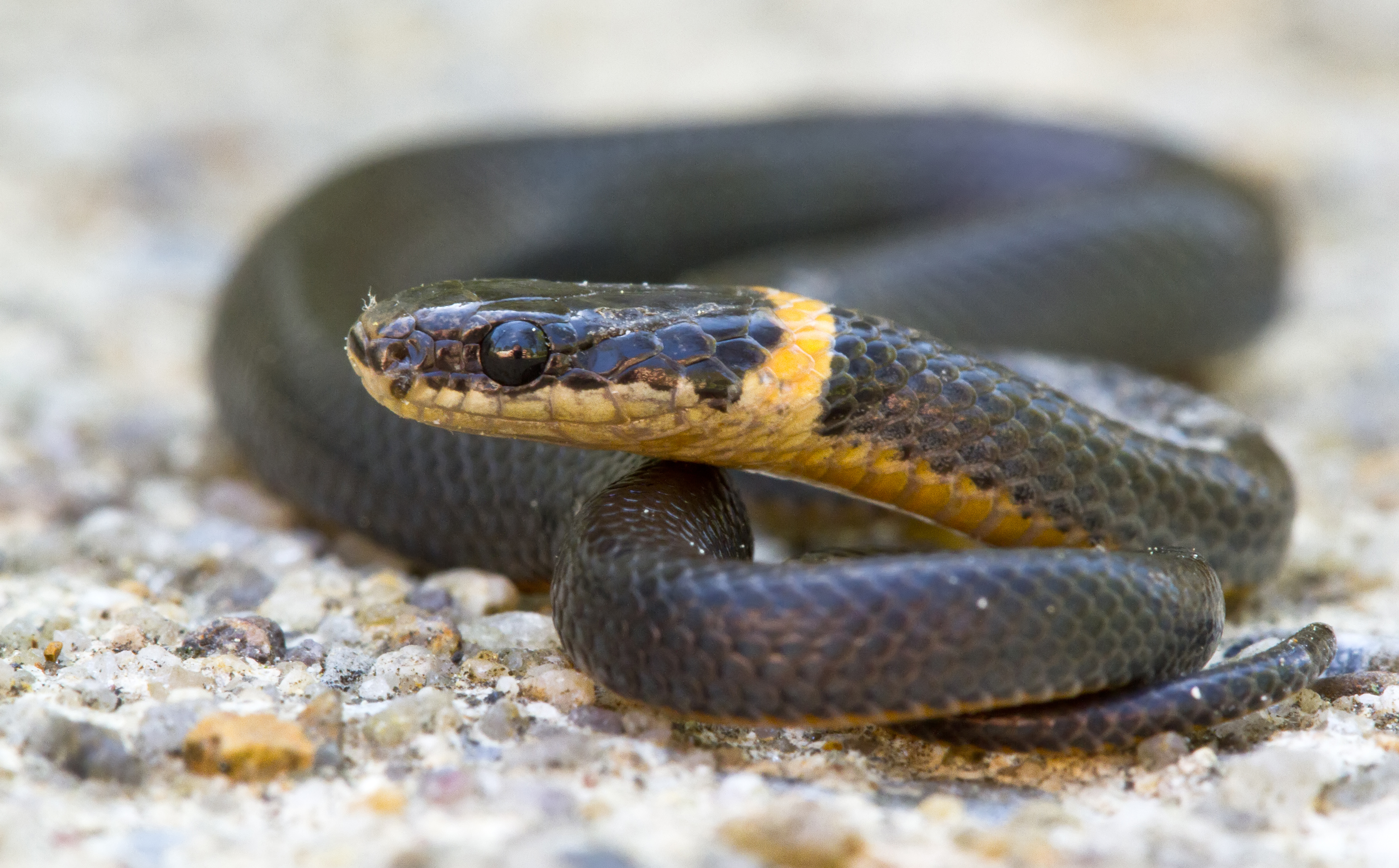
- Diadophis punctatus—ring-neck snake
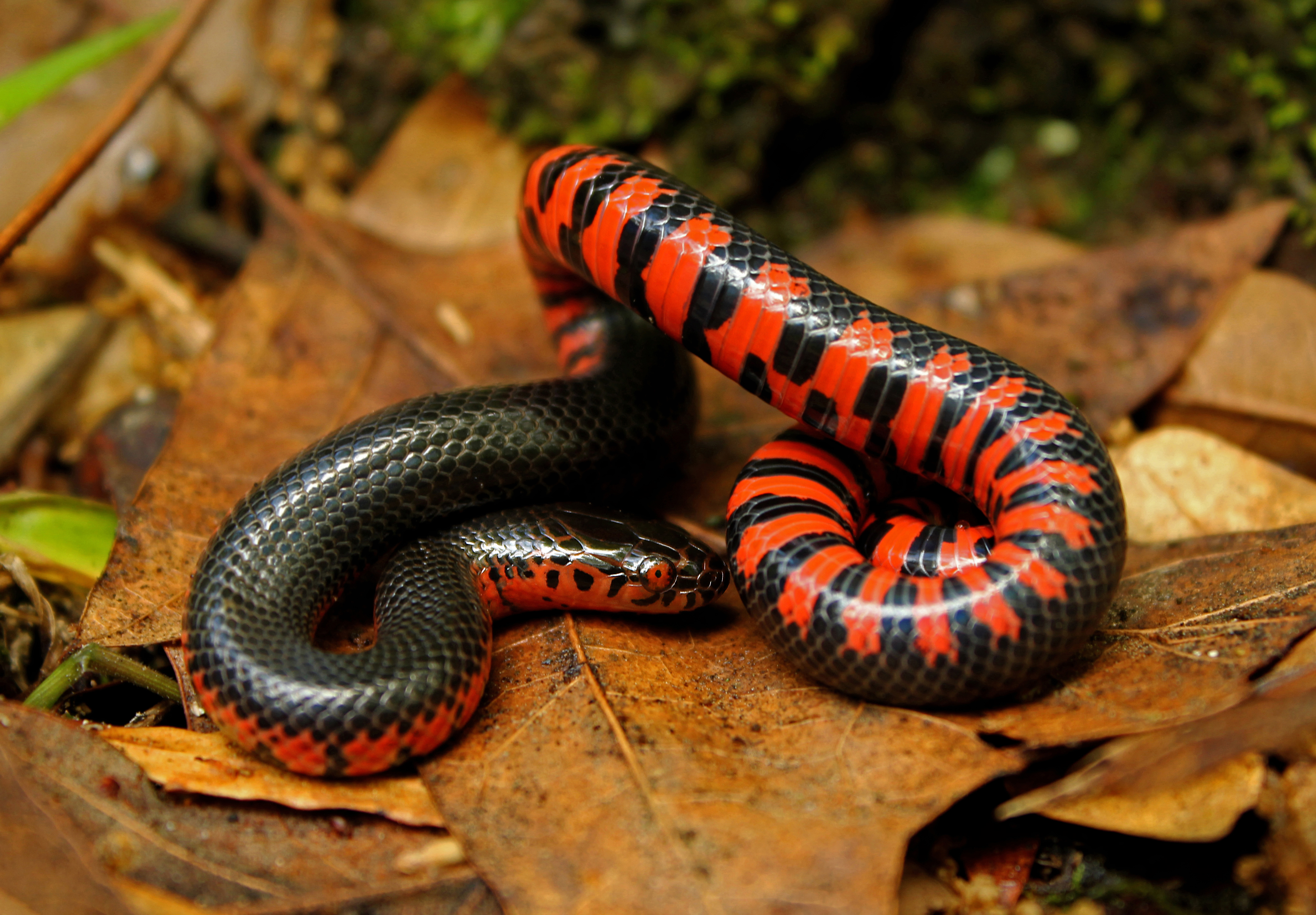
- Farancia abacura—mud snake
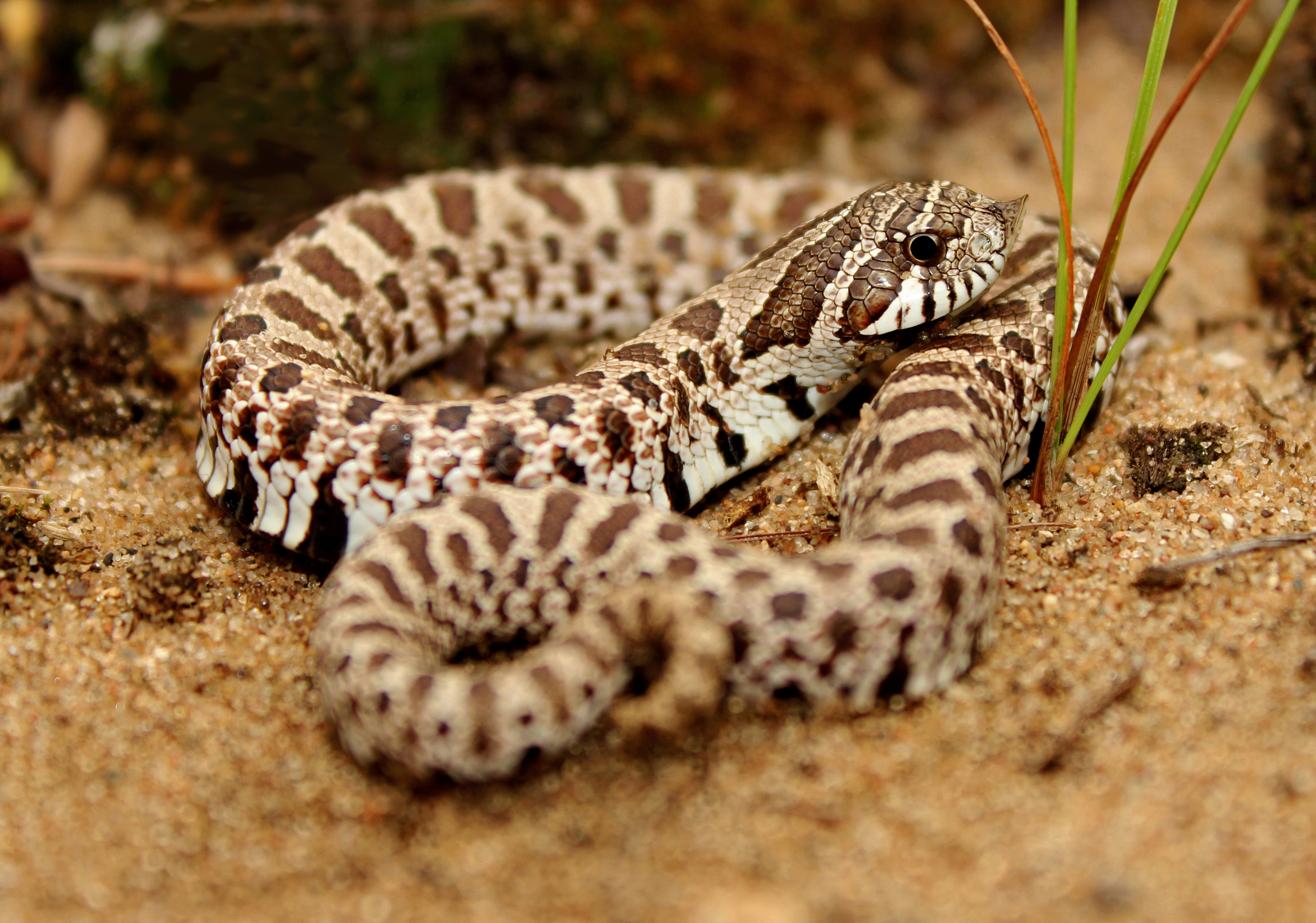
- Heterodon nasicus—western hognose snake
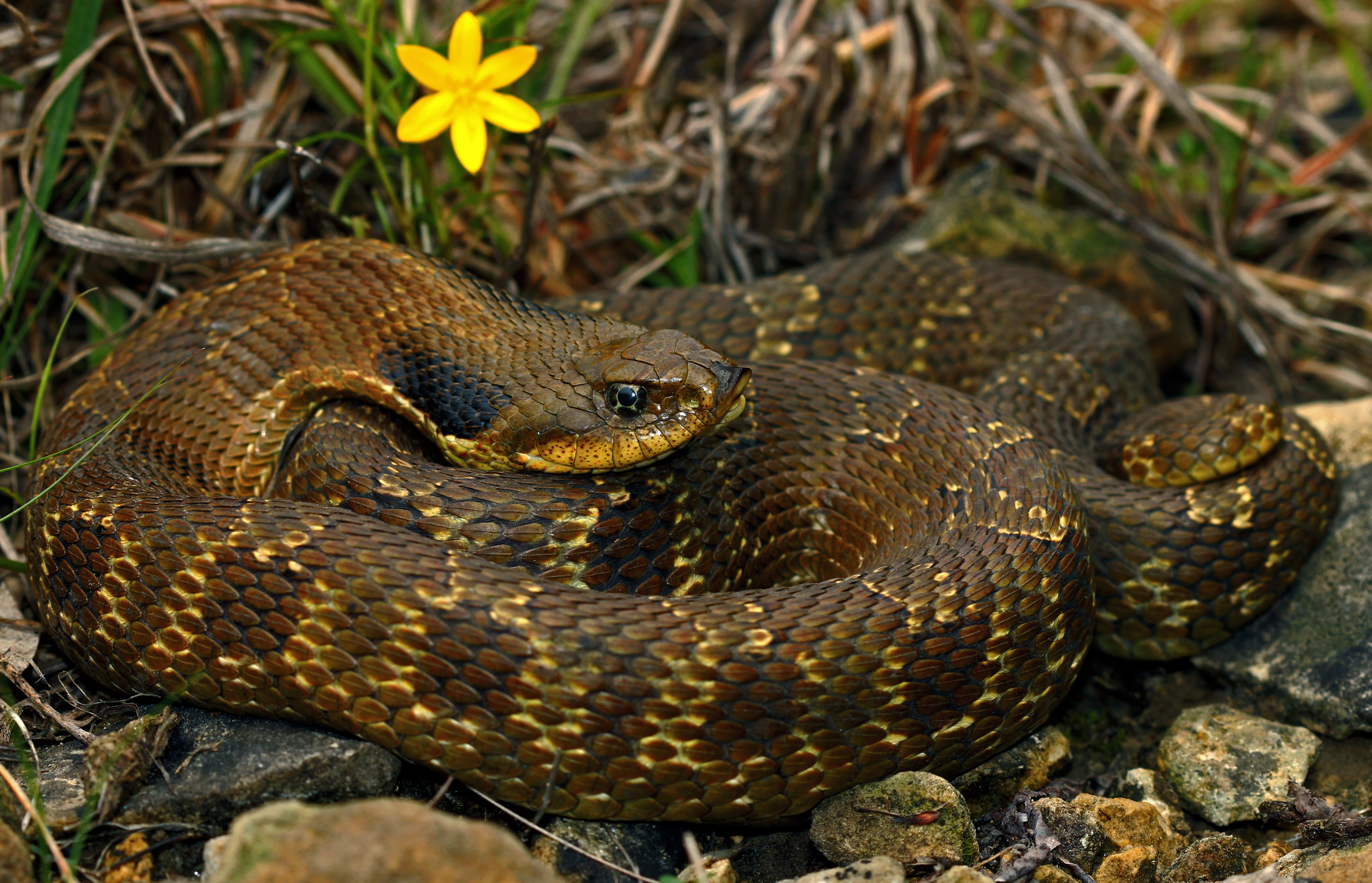
- H. platyrhinos—eastern hognose snake
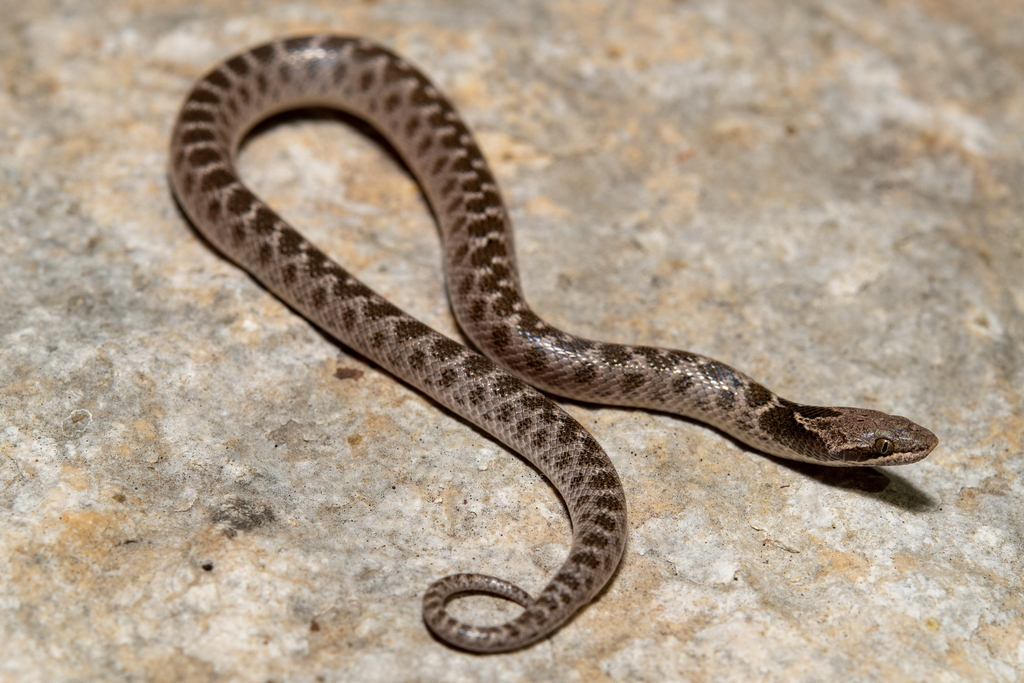
- Hypsiglena jani—Texas night snake
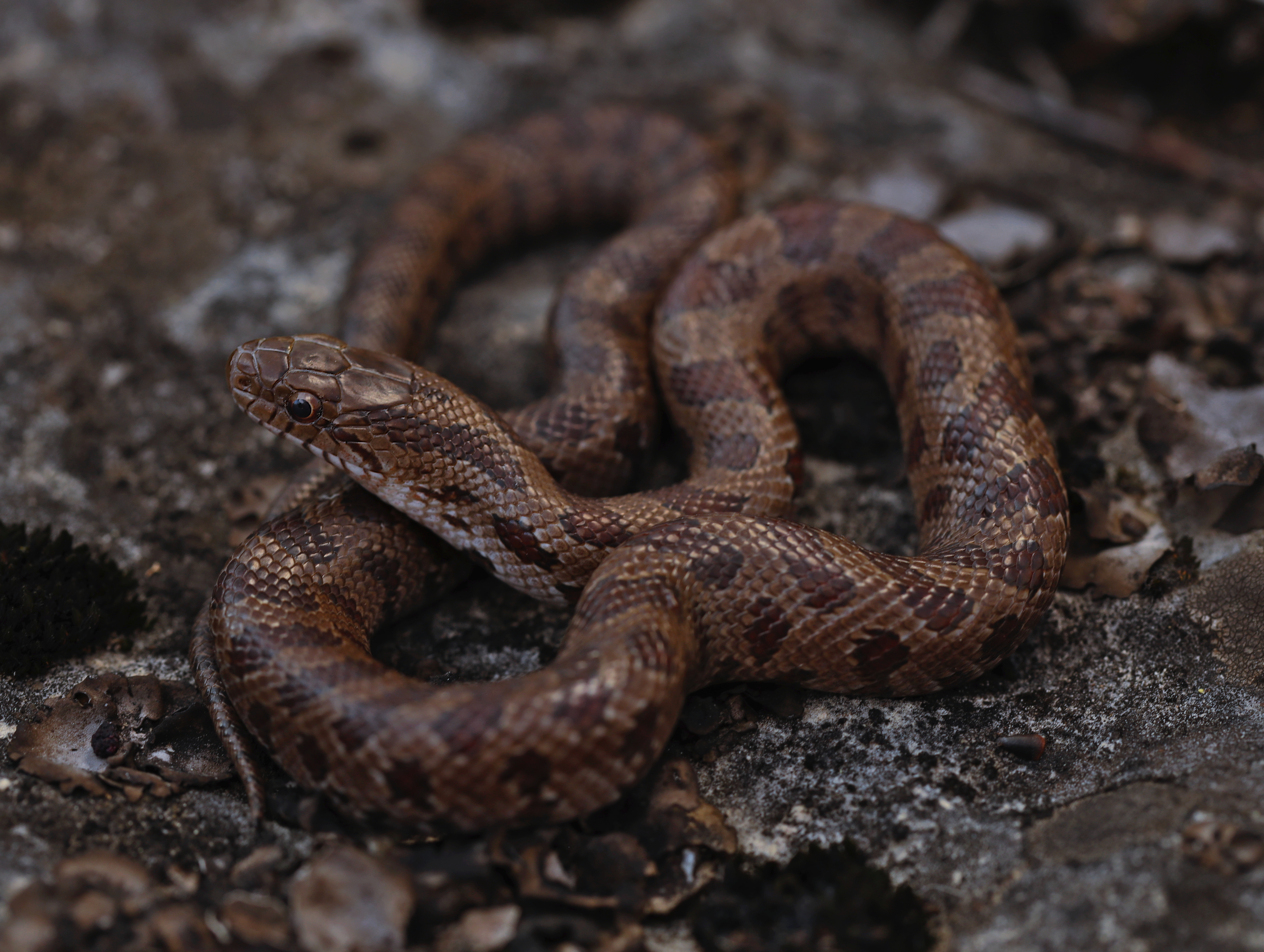
- Lampropeltis calligaster—prairie kingsnake
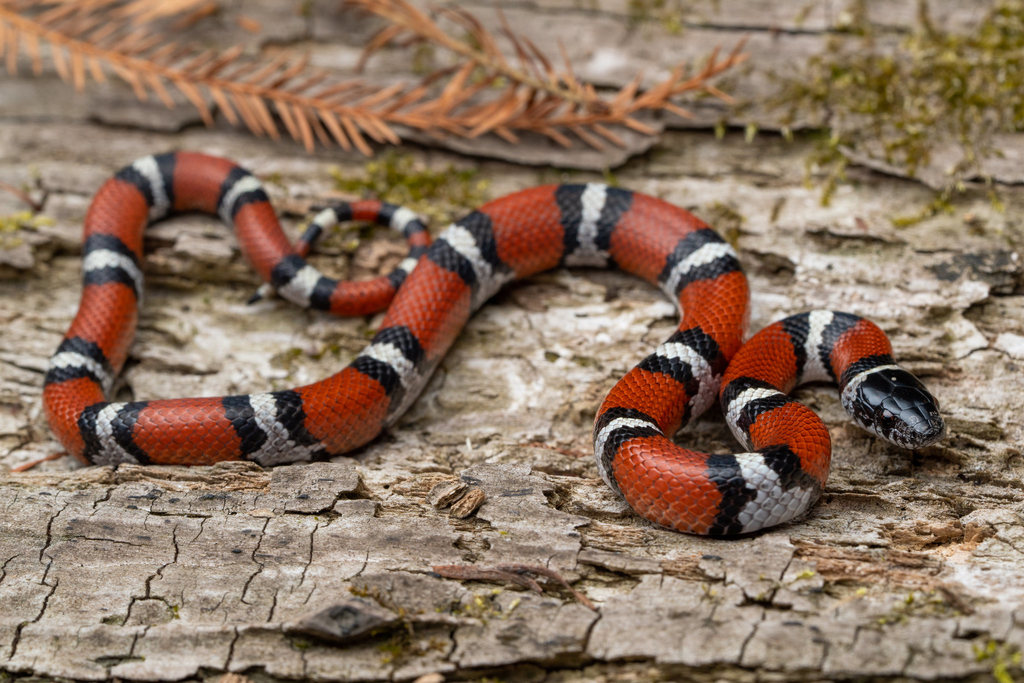
- L. gentilis—western milk snake
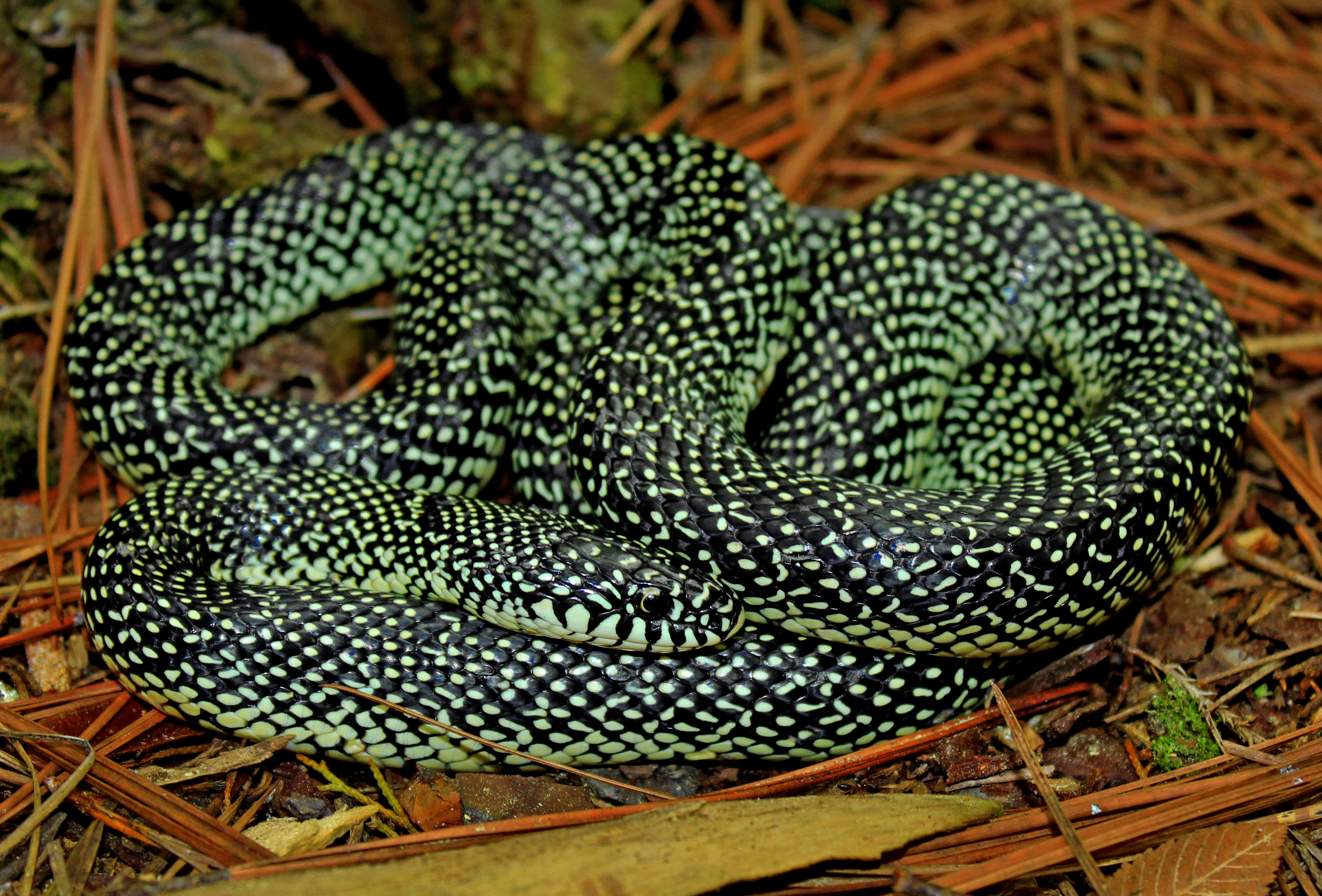
- L. holbrooki—speckled kingsnake
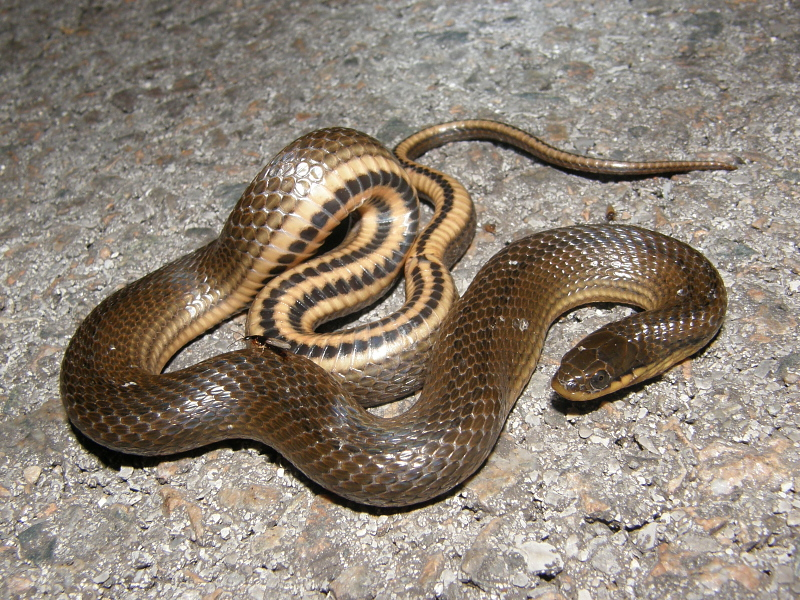
- Liodytes rigida — glossy crayfish snake
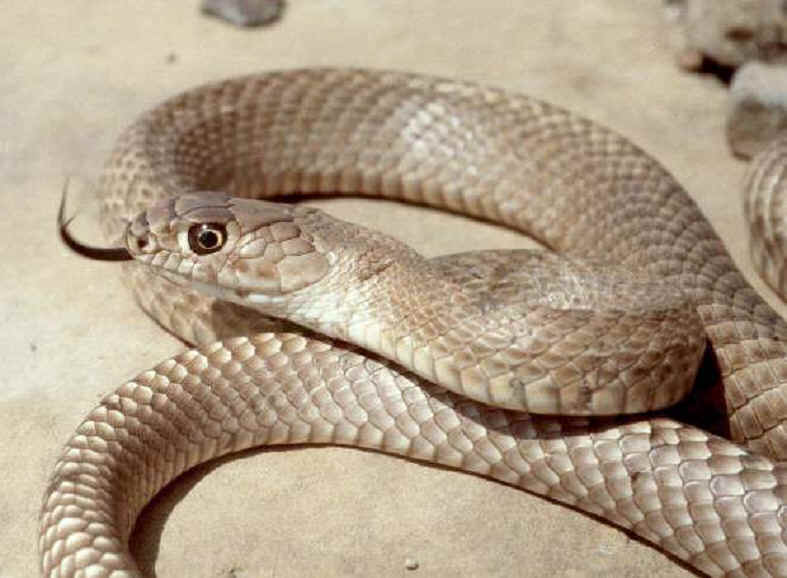
- Masticophis flagellum—coachwhip snake
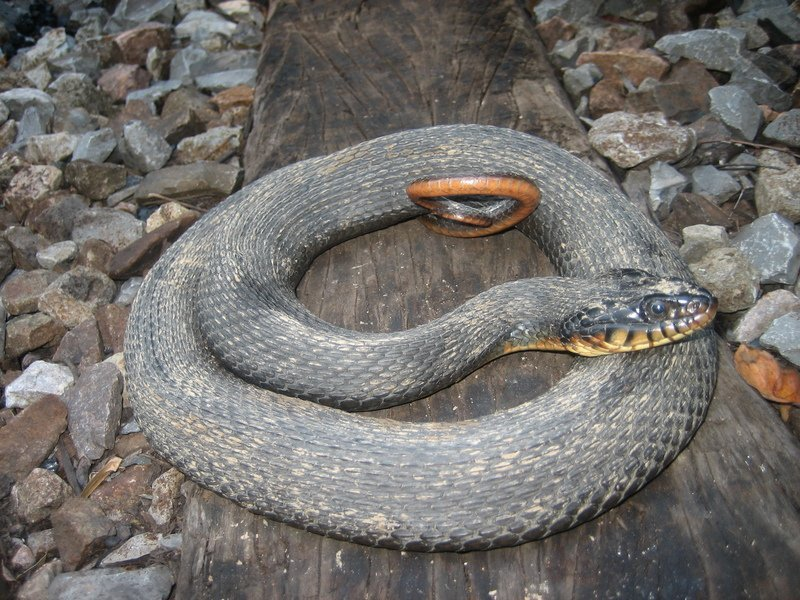
- Nerodia erythrogaster—plain-bellied water snake
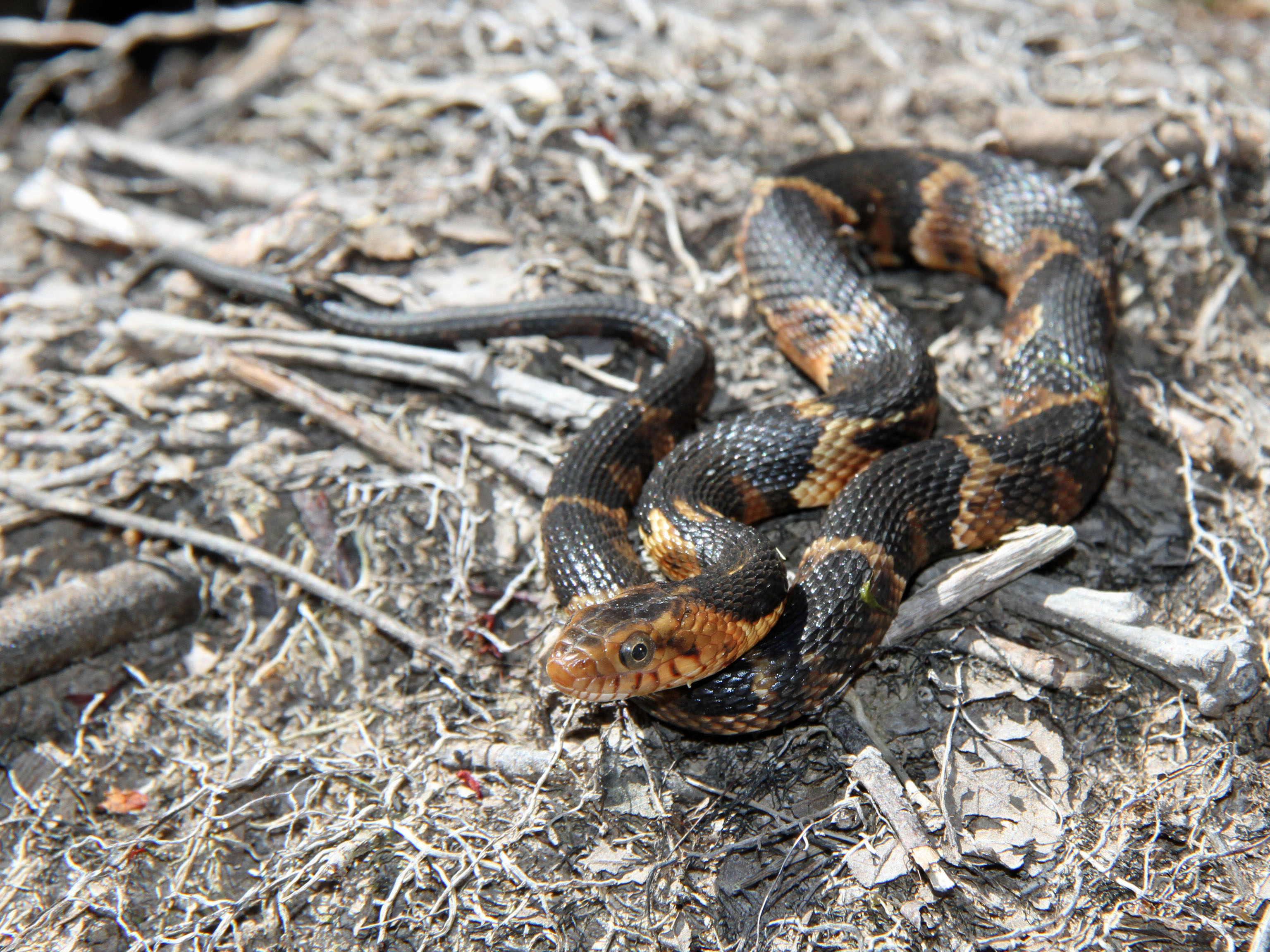
- N. fasciata—banded water snake
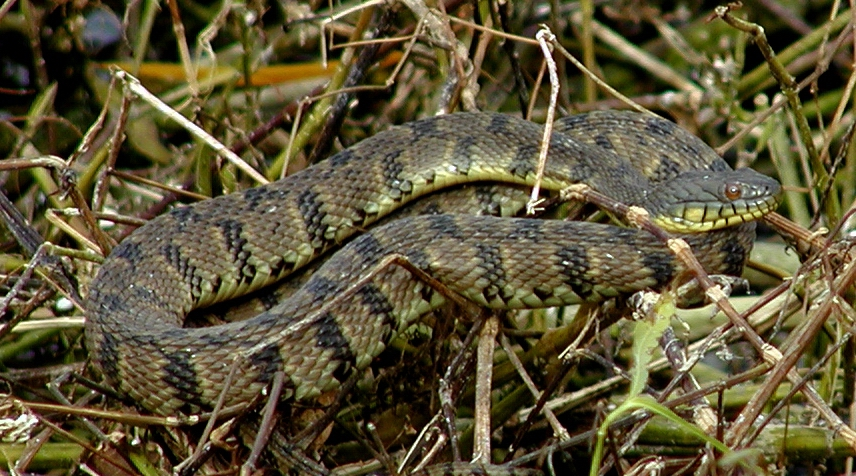
- N. rhombifera—diamond-back water snake
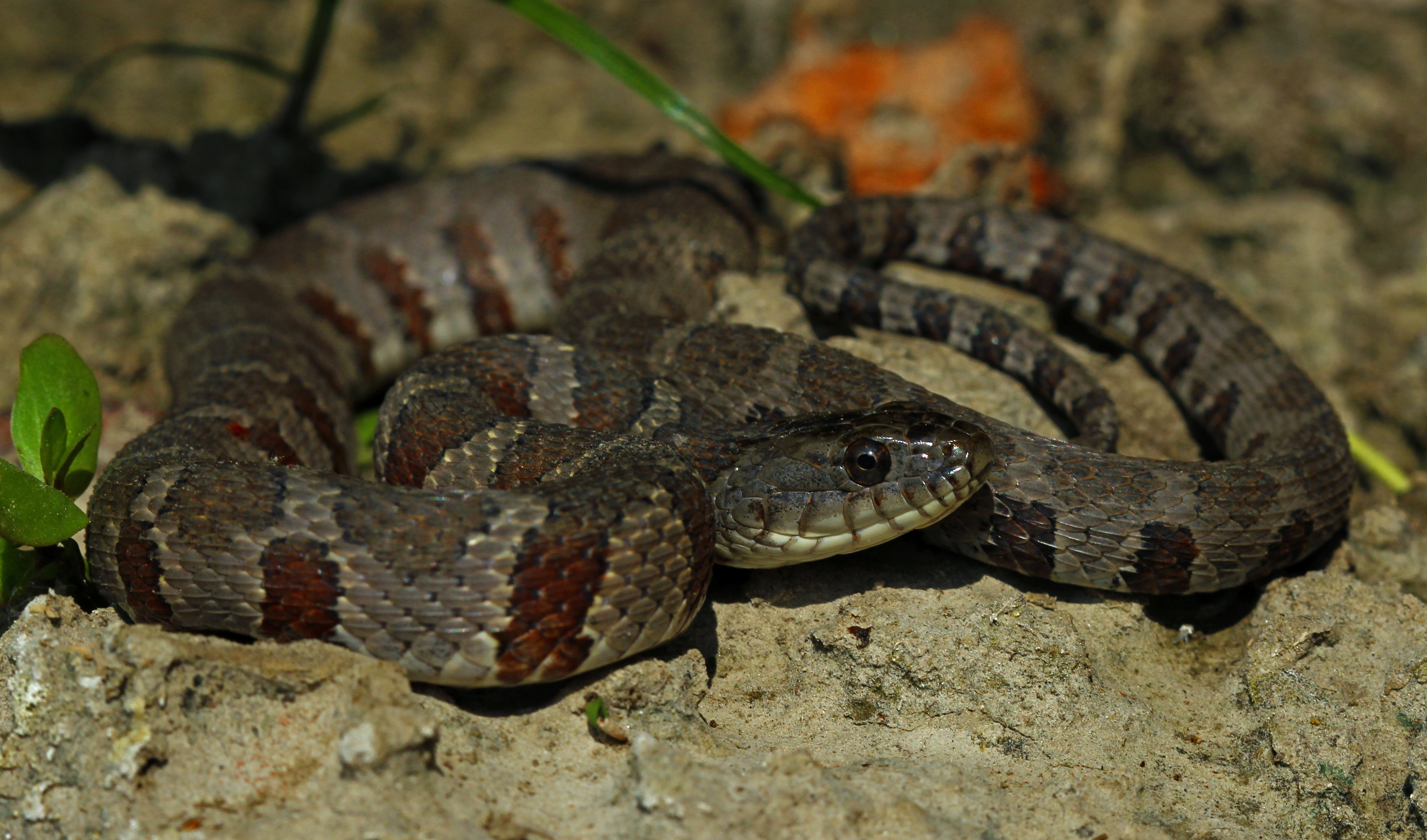
- N. sipedon—northern and midland water snake
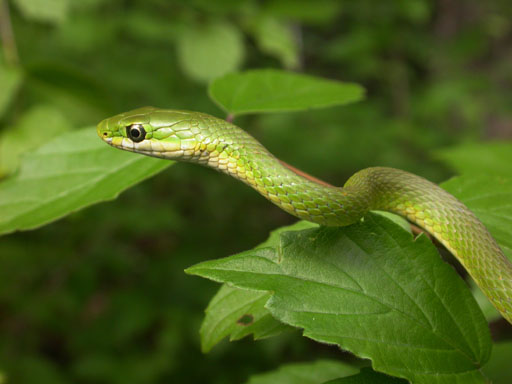
- Opheodrys aestivus—keeled green or rough green snake
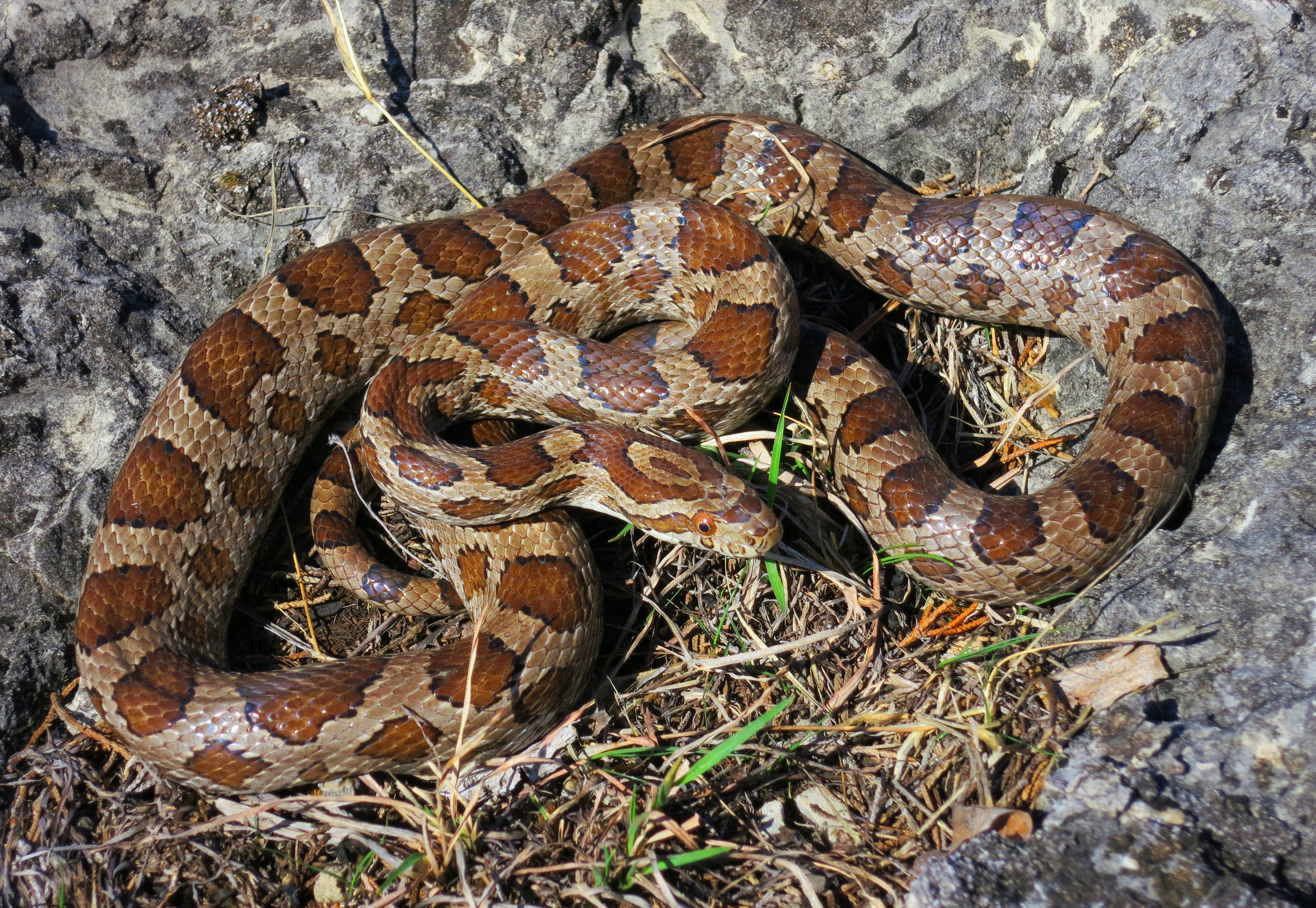
- Pantherophis emoryi—great plains rat snake
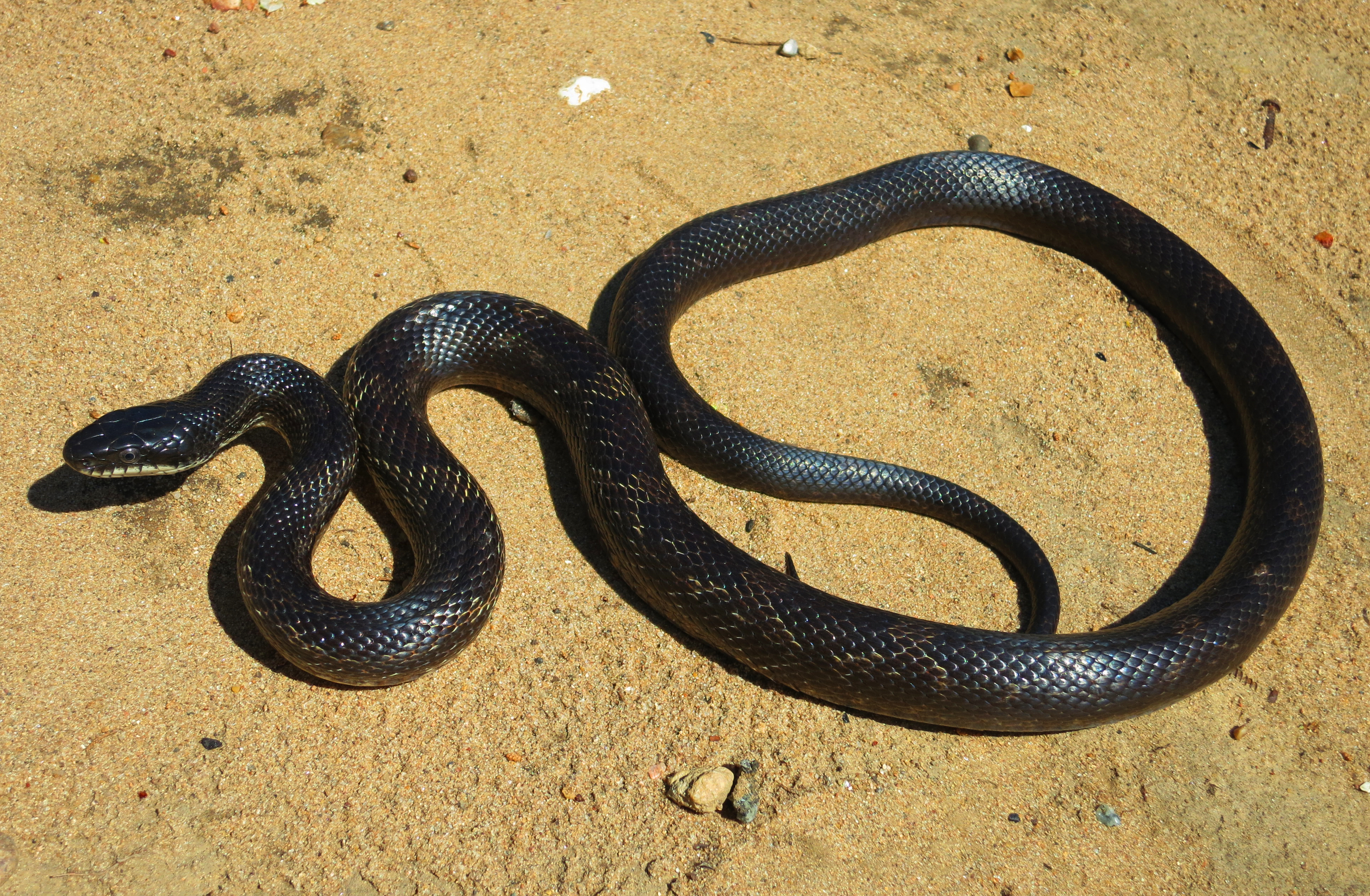
- P. obsoletus—western rat snake
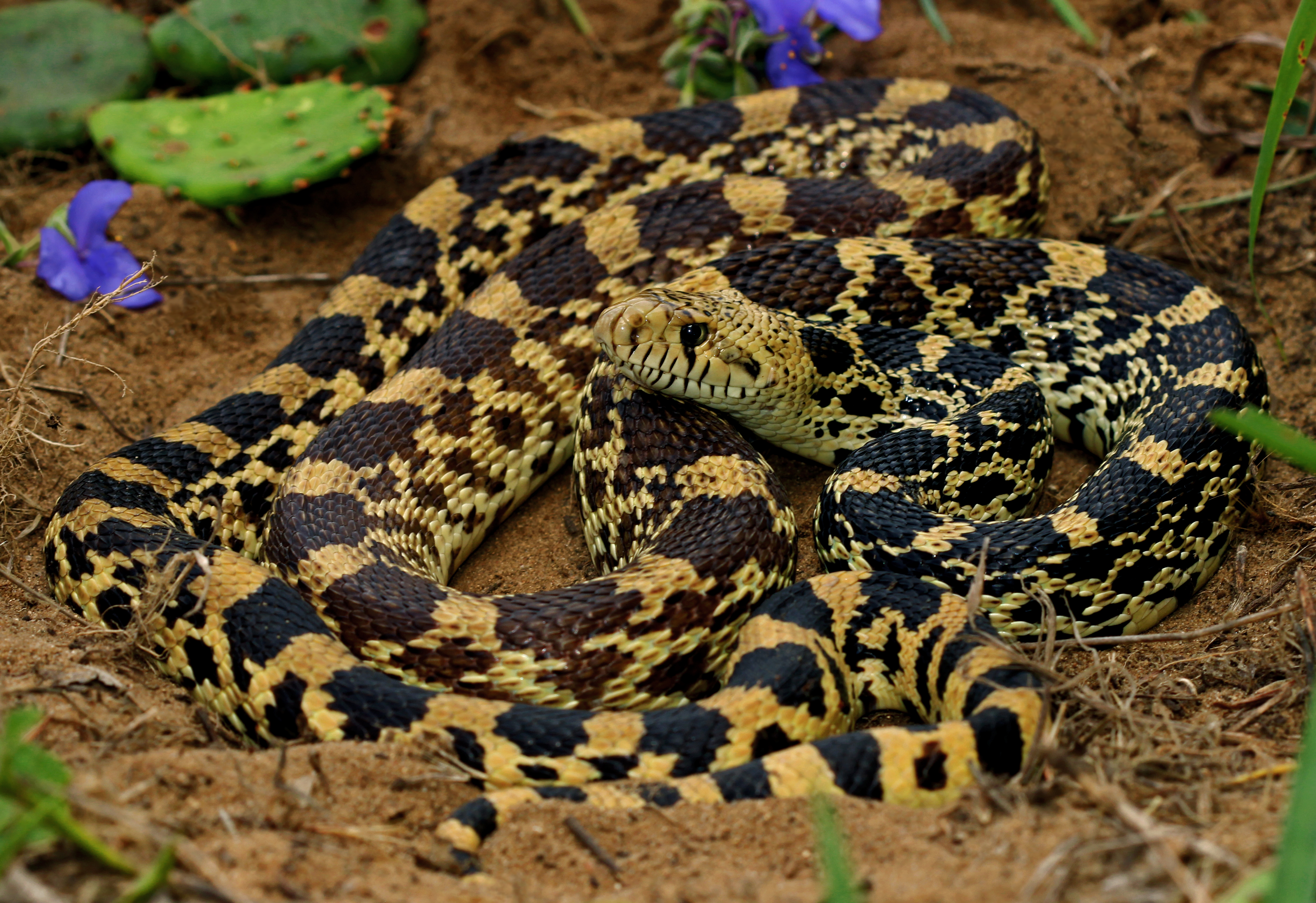
- Pituophis catenifer—bullsnake
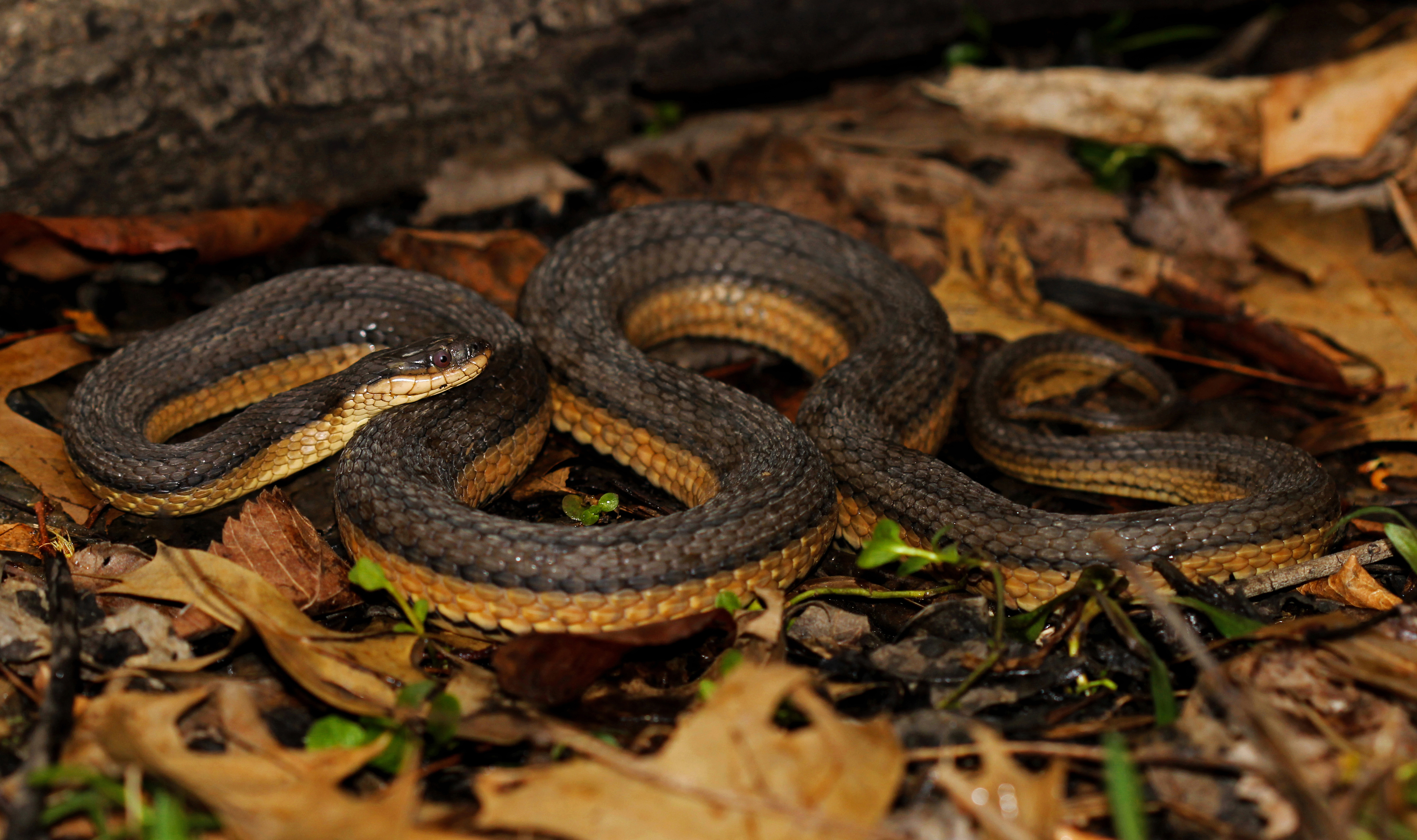
- Regina grahami—Graham's crayfish snake
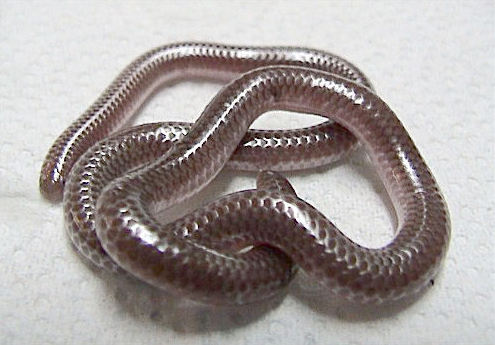
- Rena dulcis—Texas blind snake
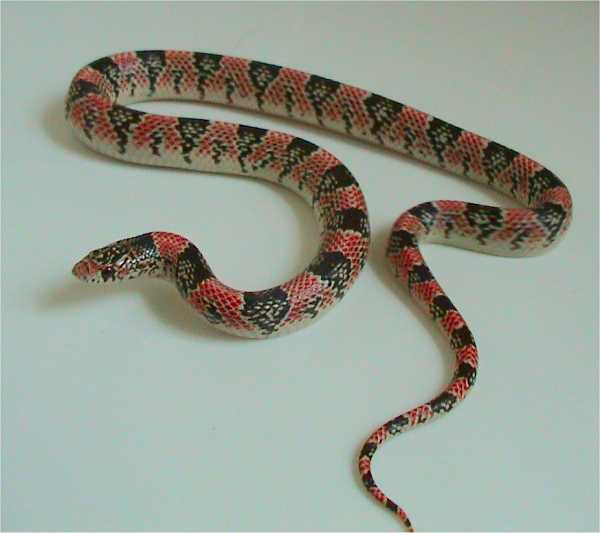
- Rhinocheilus lecontei—long-nosed snake
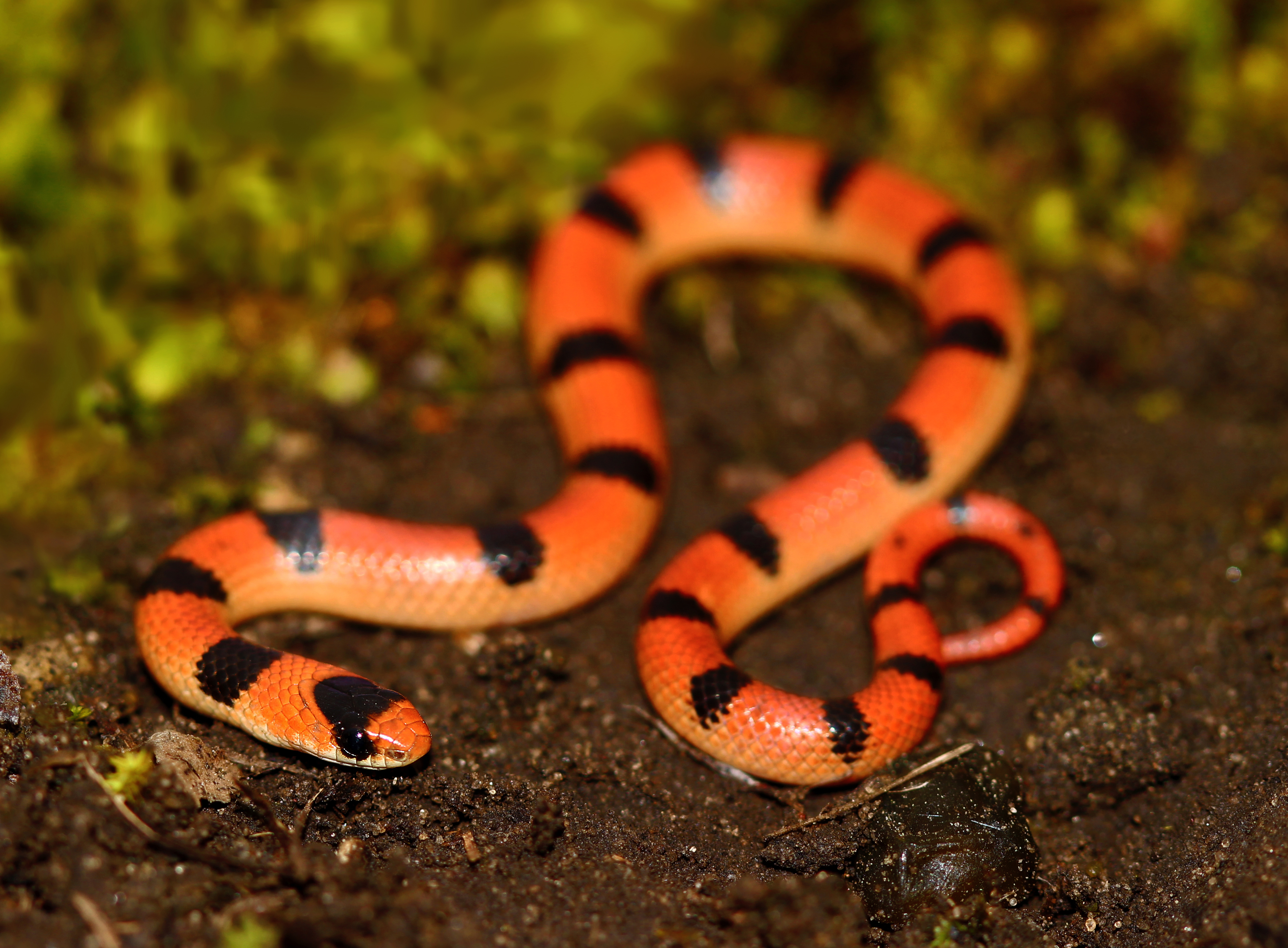
- Sonora episcopa—Great Plains ground snake
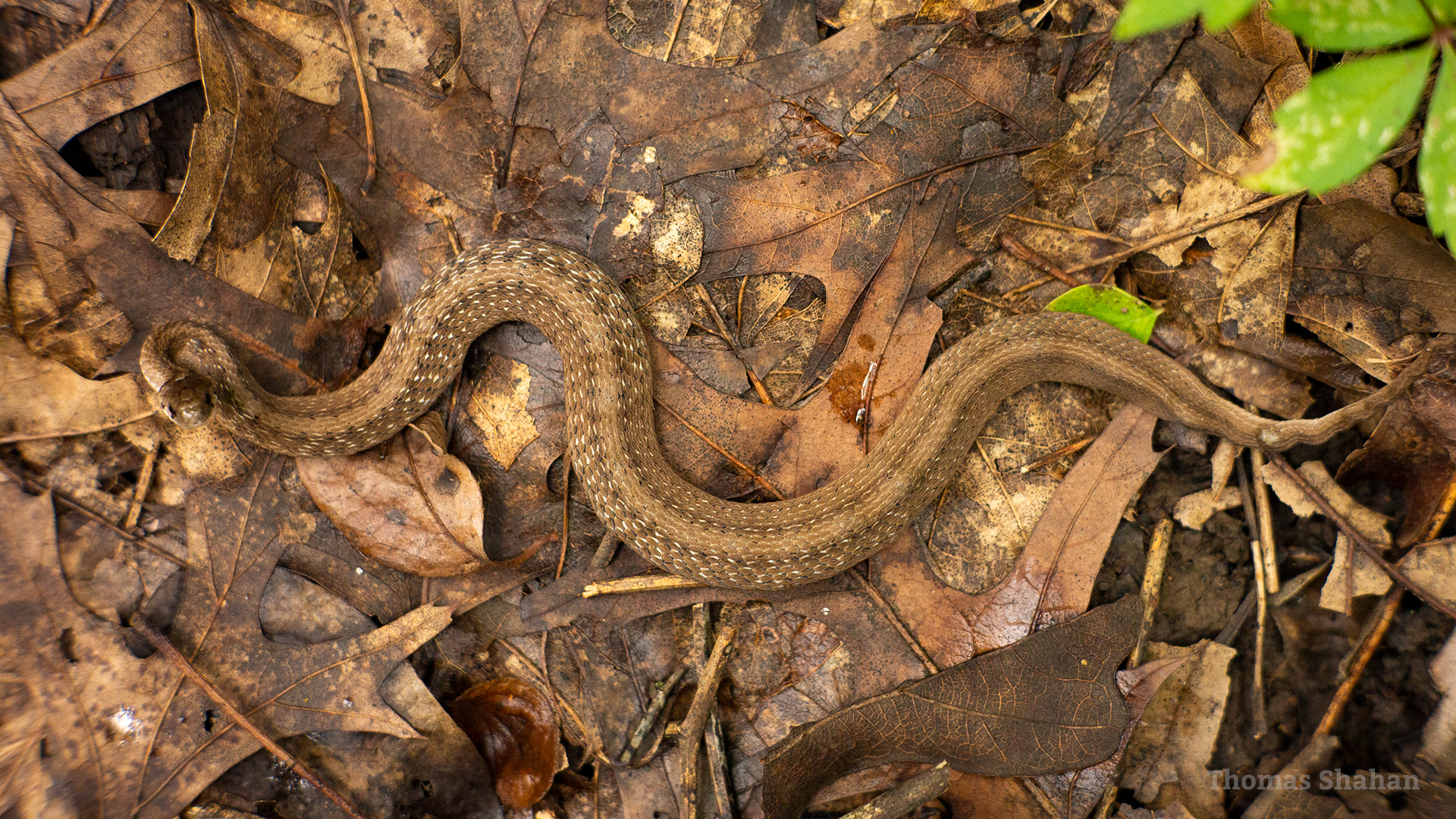
- Storeria dekayi—Dekay's brown snake
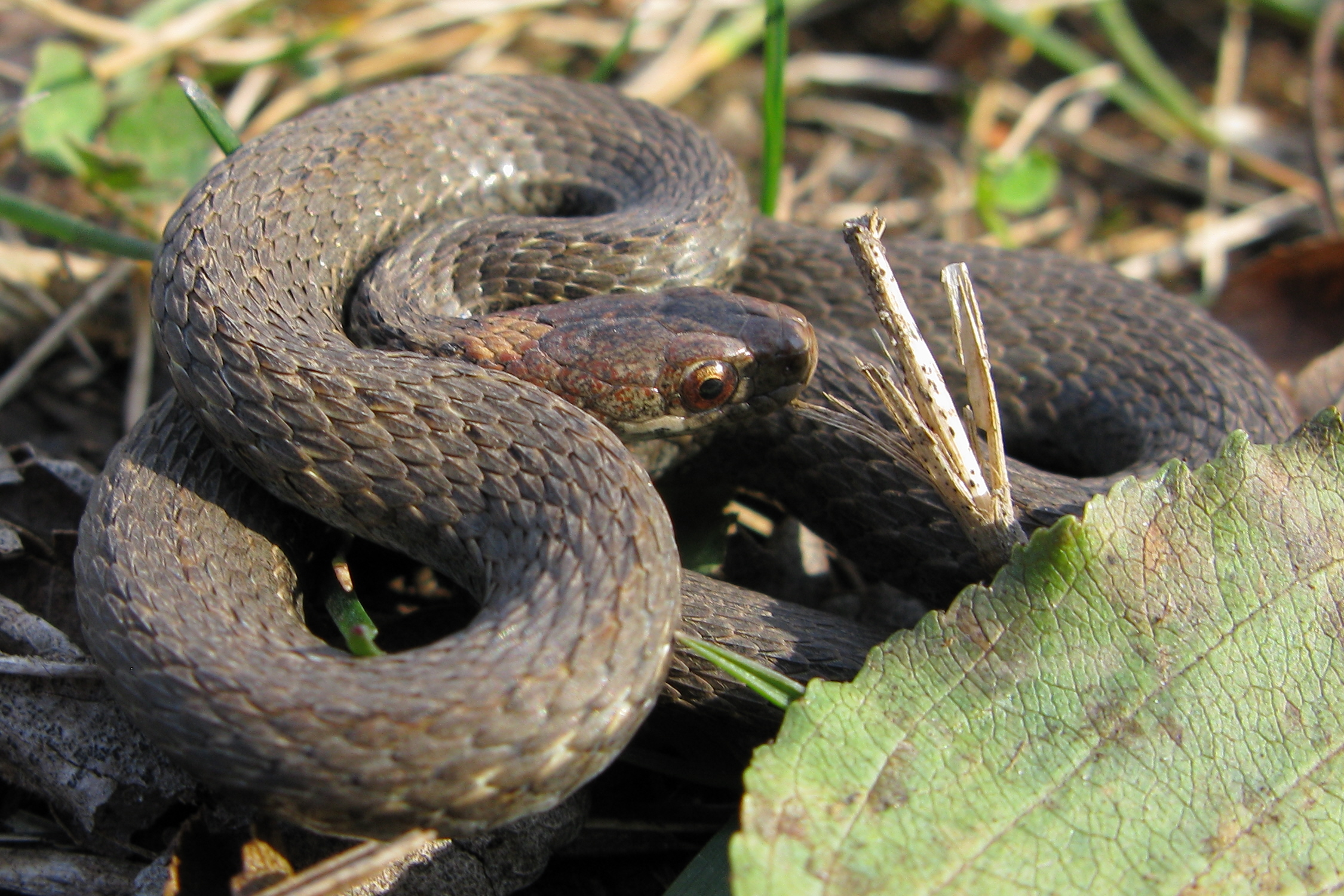
- S. occipitomaculata—red bellied snake
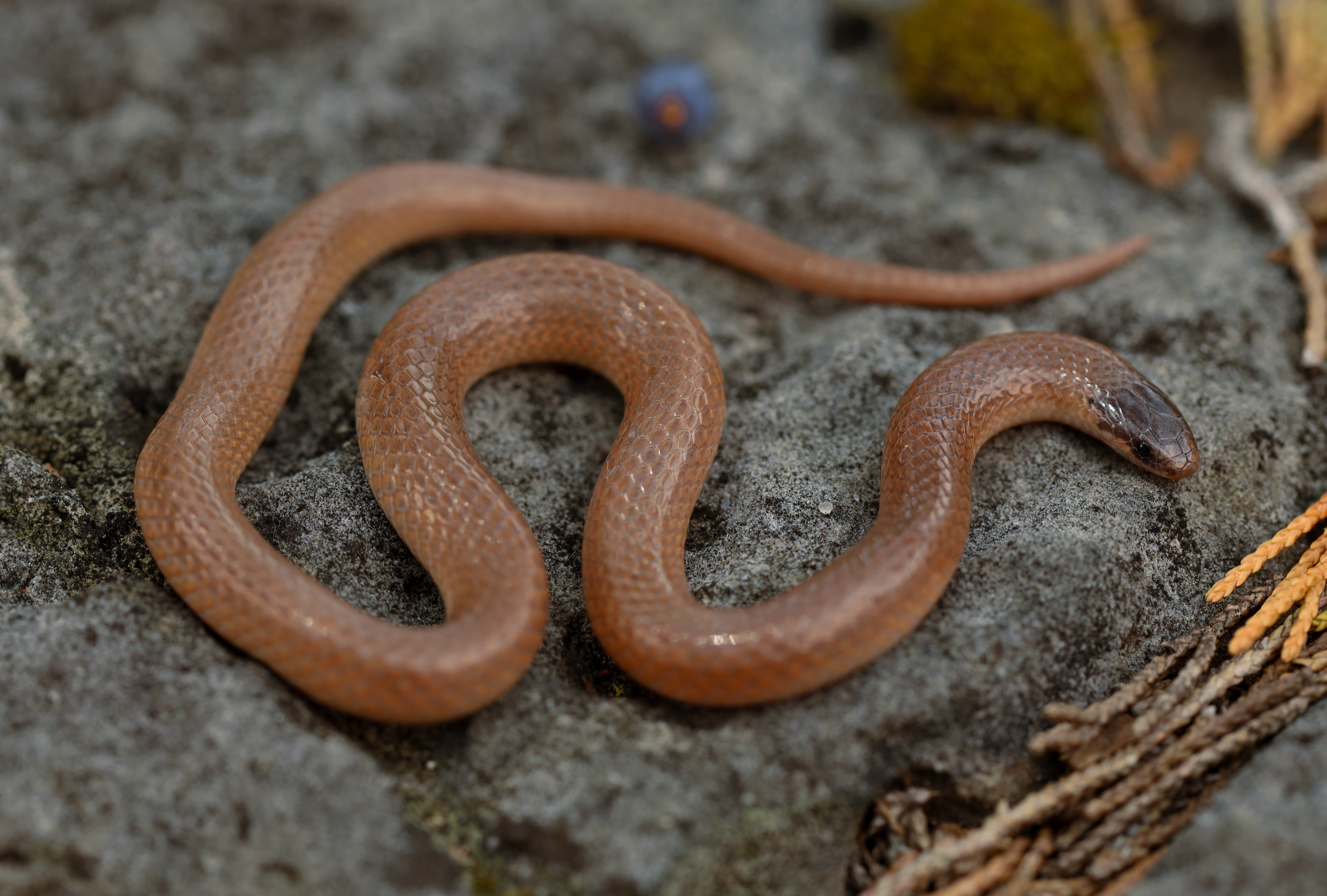
- Tantilla gracilis—flat-headed snake
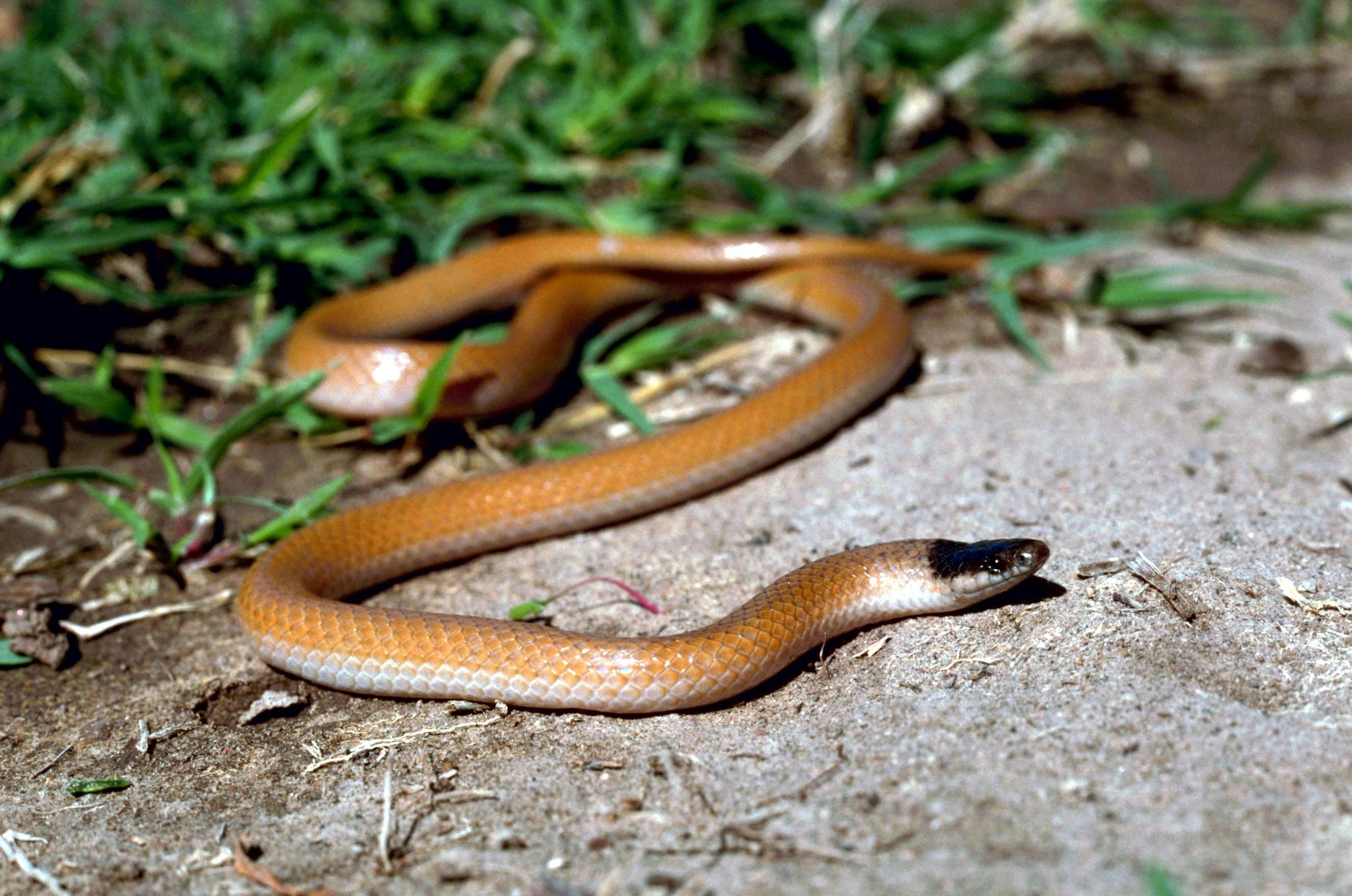
- T. nigriceps—black-headed snake
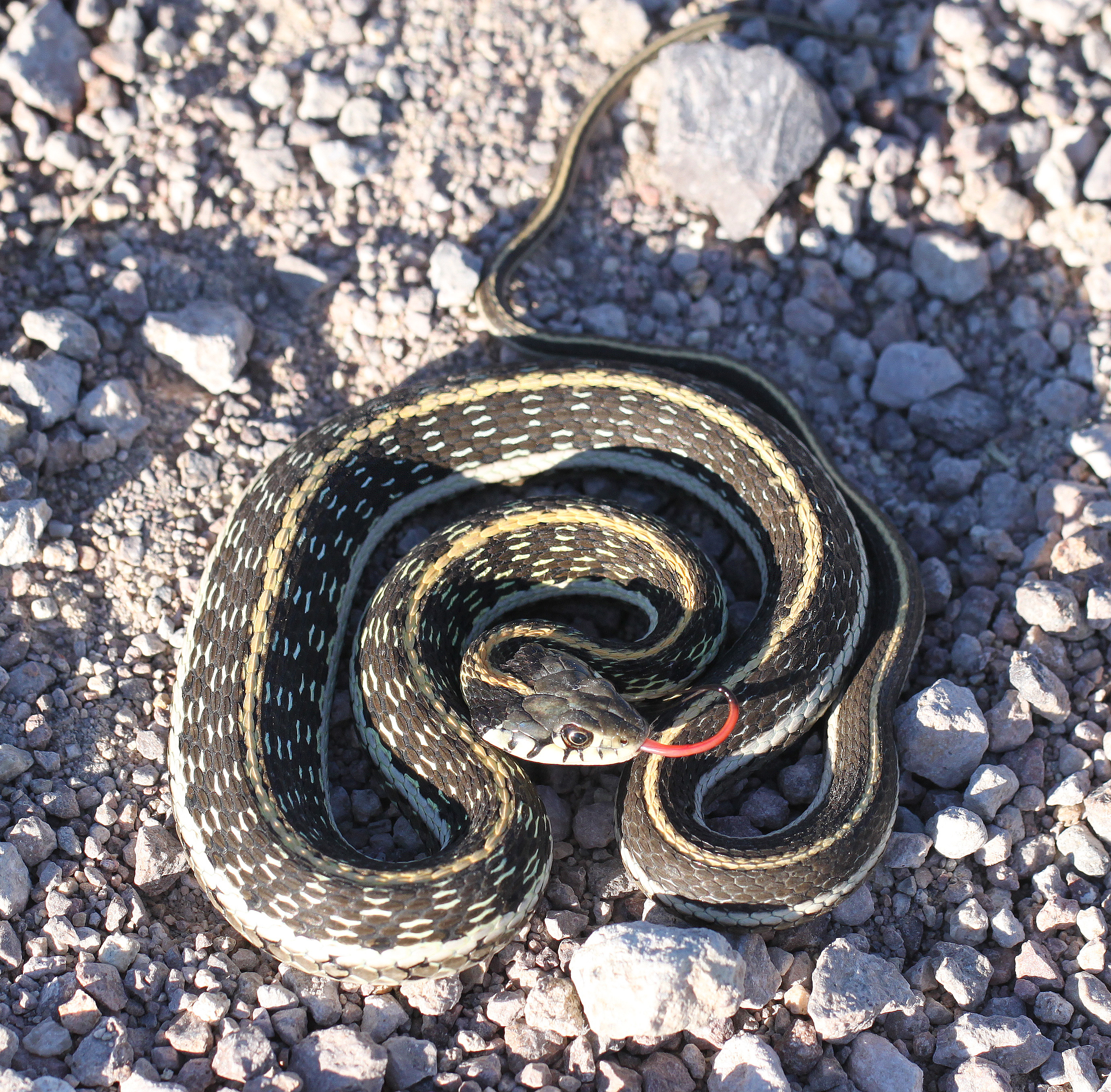
- Thamnophis cyrtopsis—black-necked garter snake
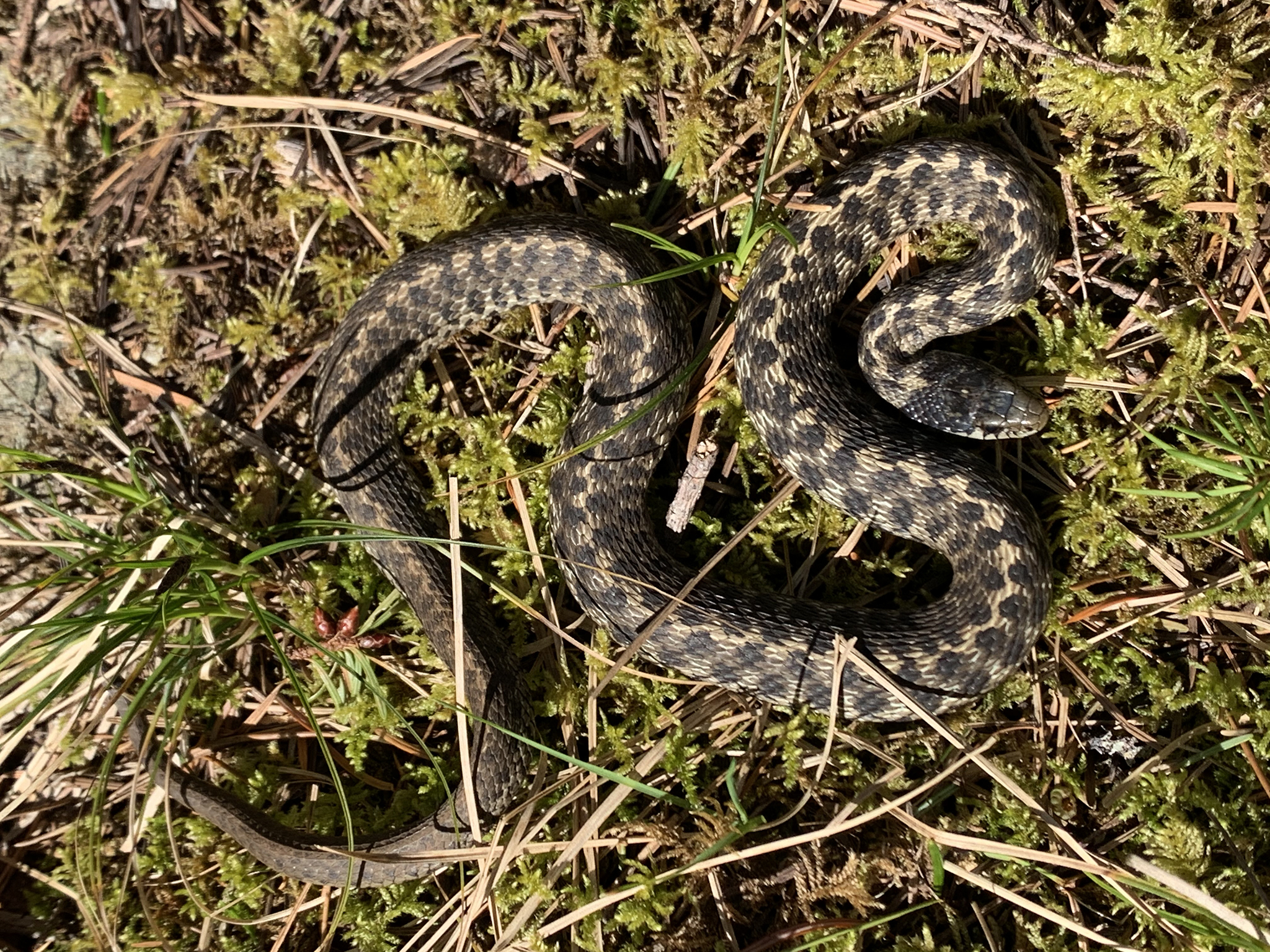
- T. elegans—wandering garter snake
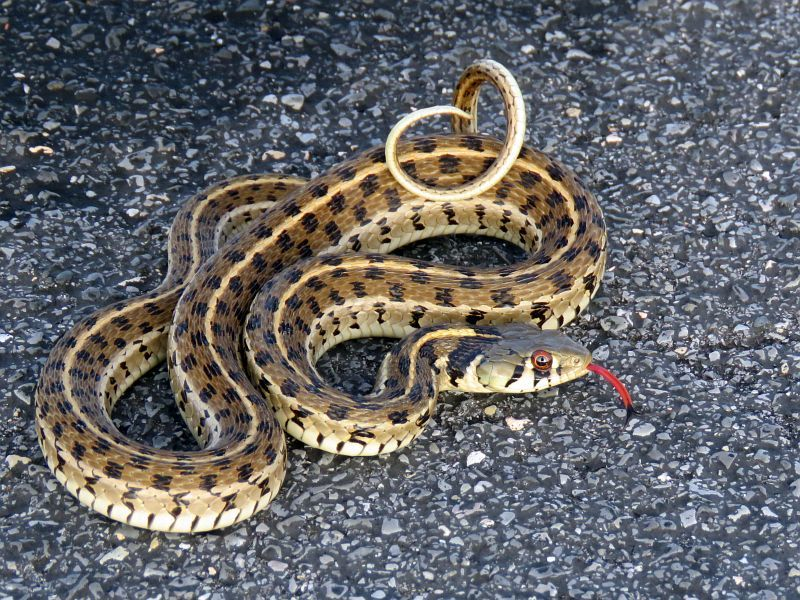
- T. marcianus—checkered garter snake
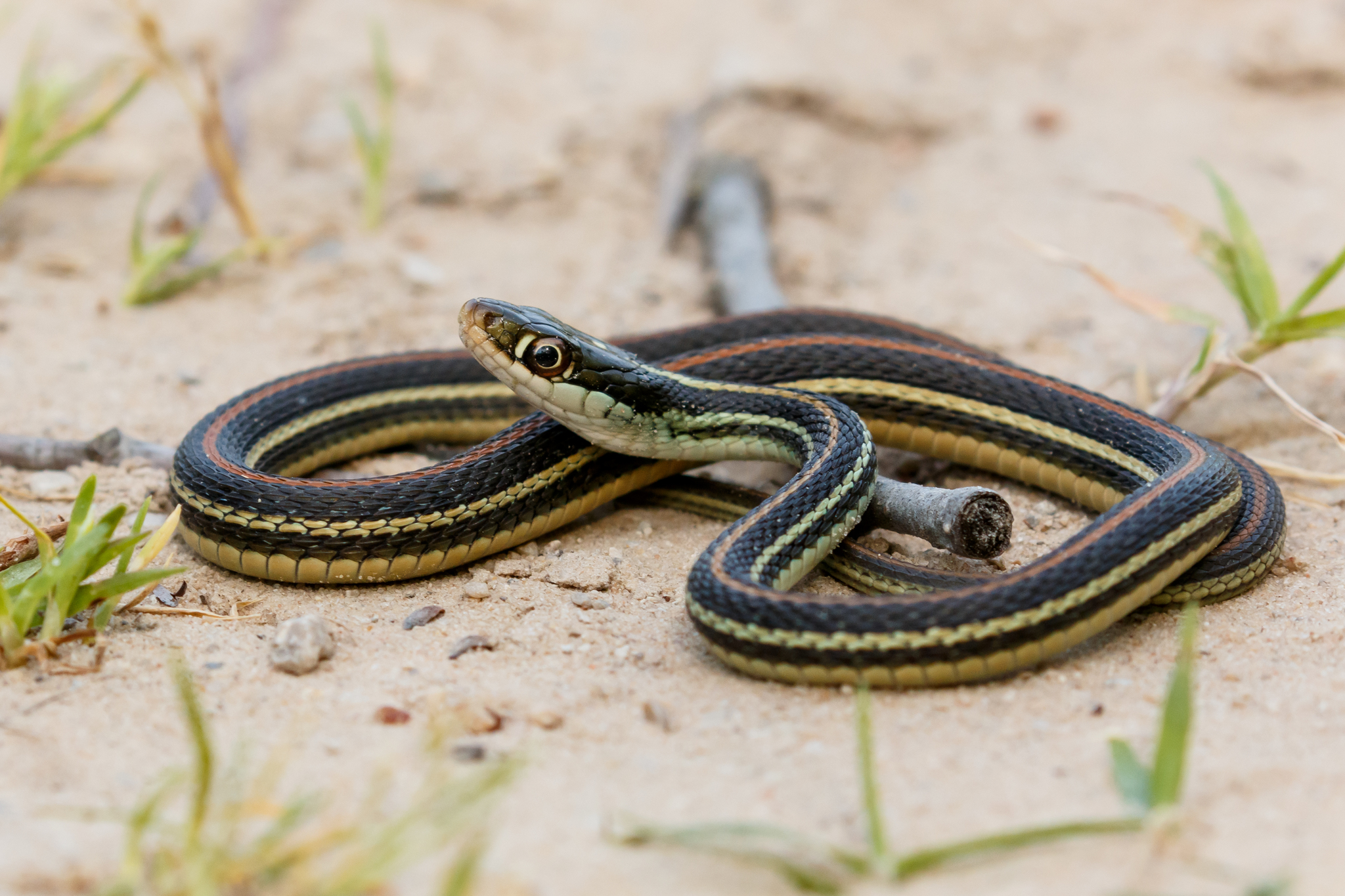
- T. proximus—western ribbon snake
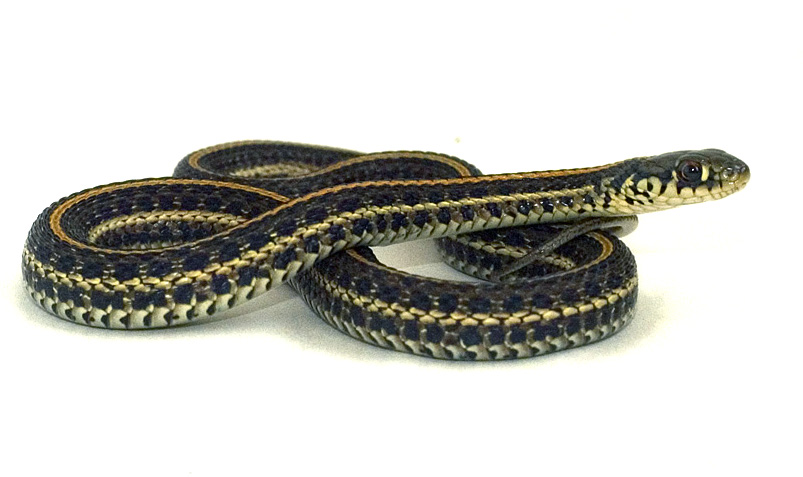
- T. radix—plains garter snake
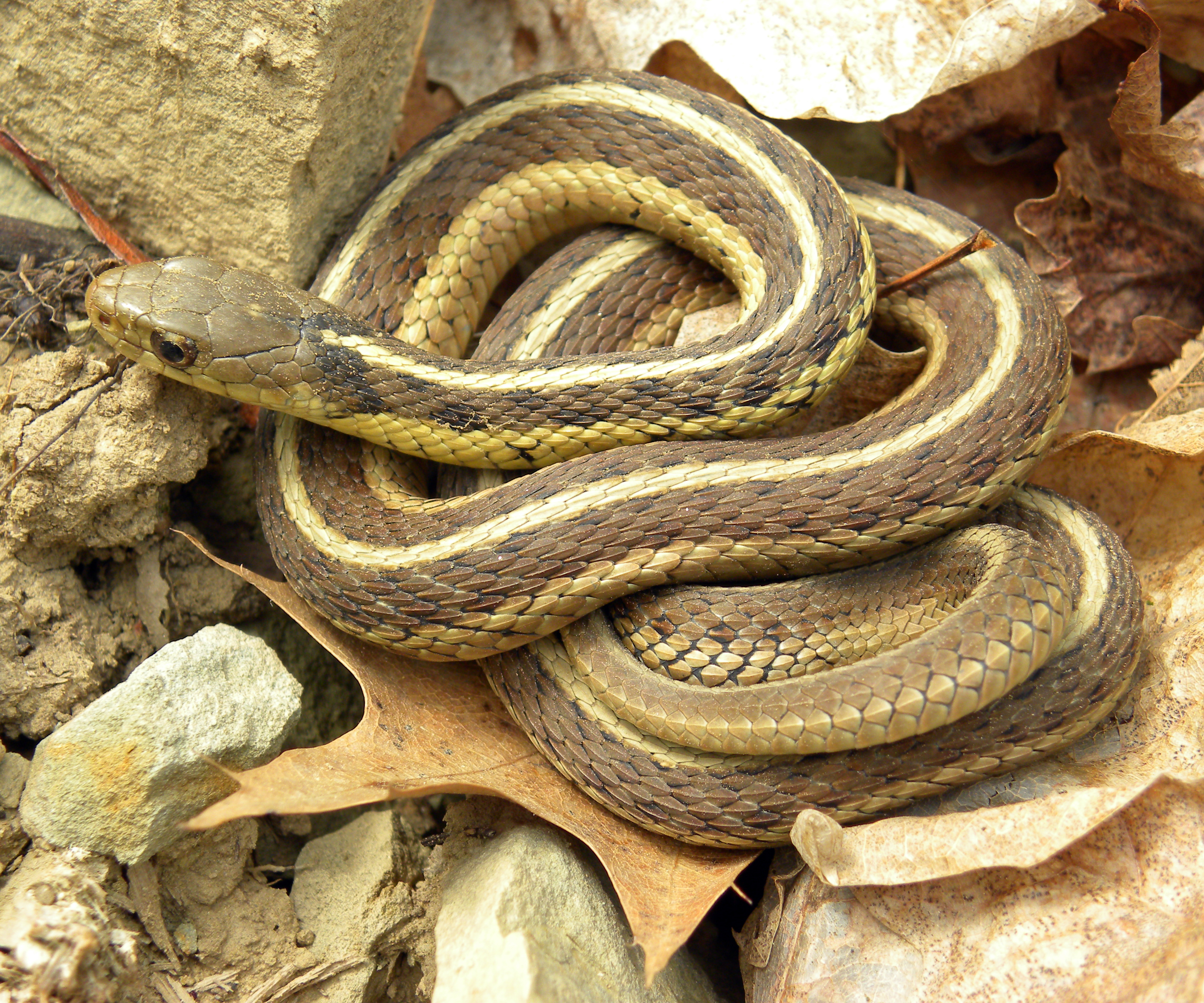
- T. sirtalis—common garter snake
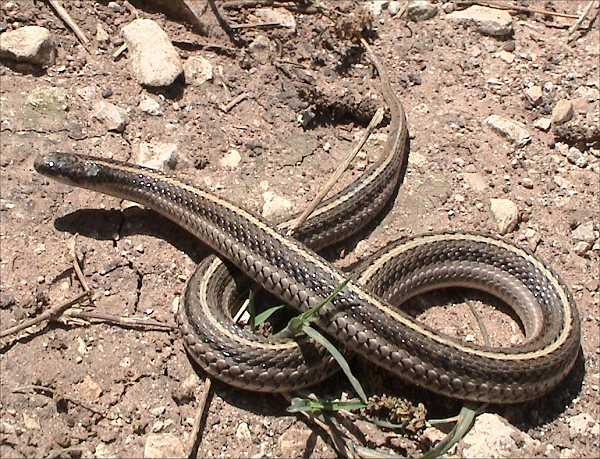
- Tropidoclonion lineatum—lined snake
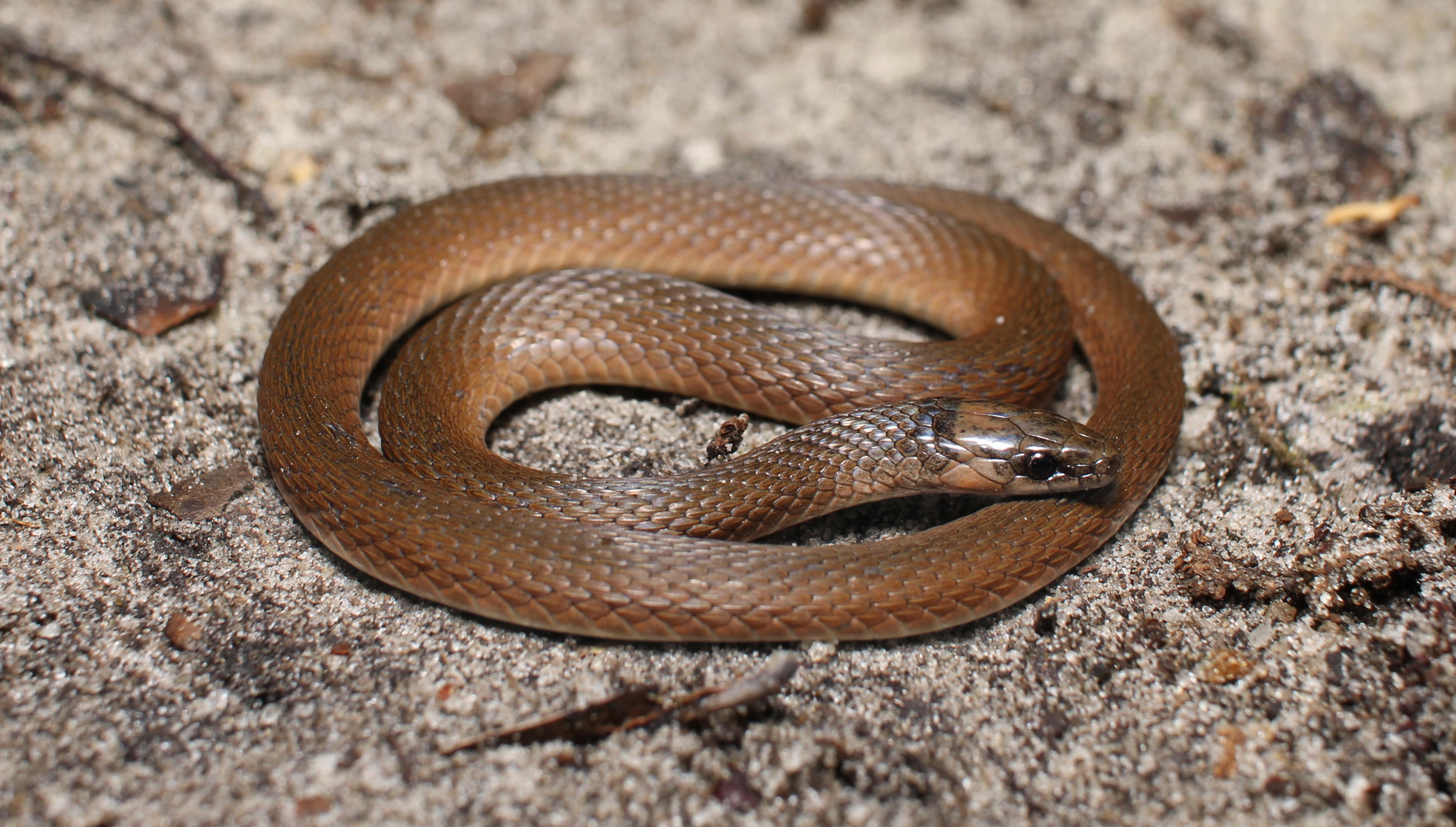
- Virginia striatula—rough earth snake
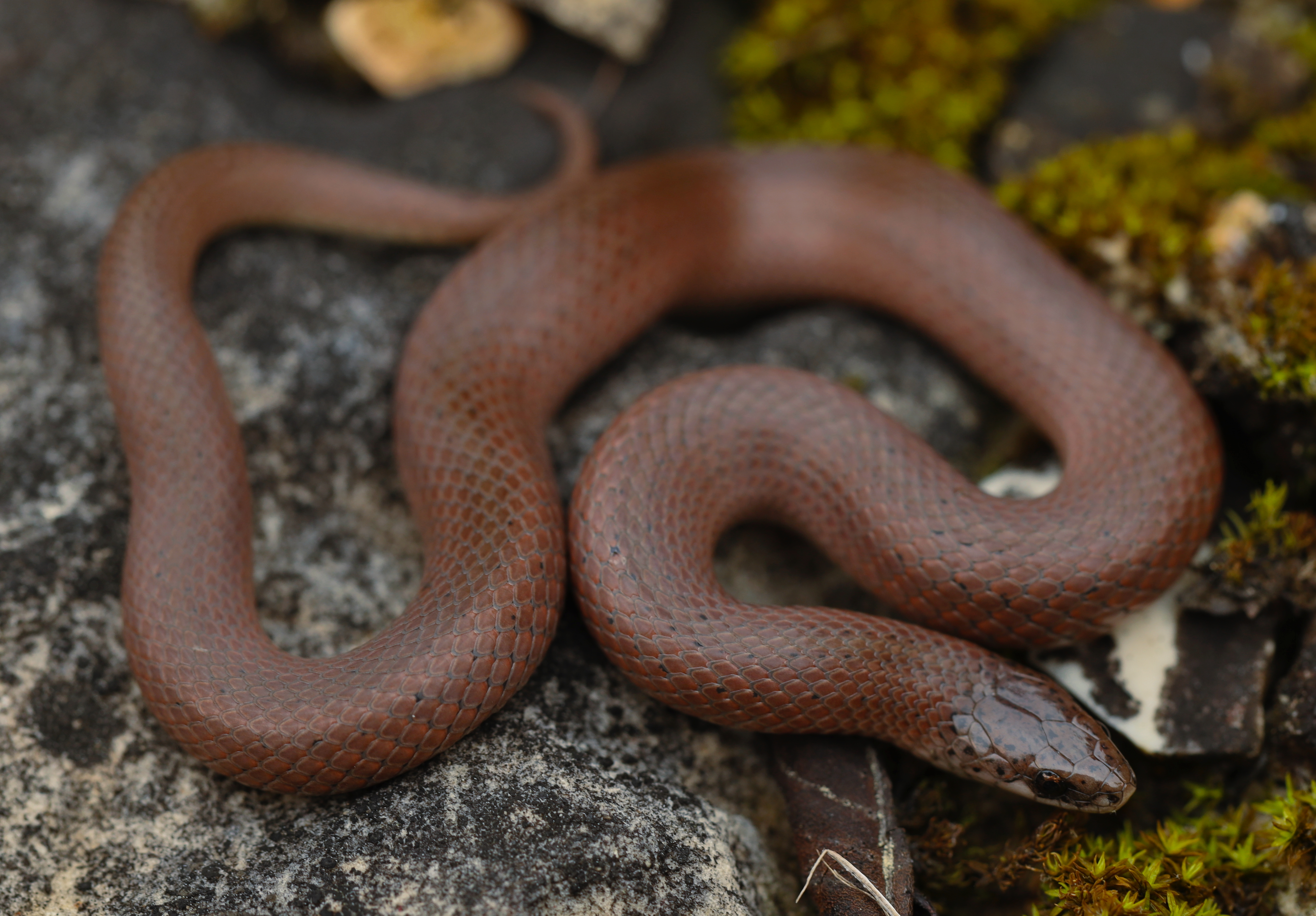
- V. valeriae—smooth earth snake

Venomous snakes

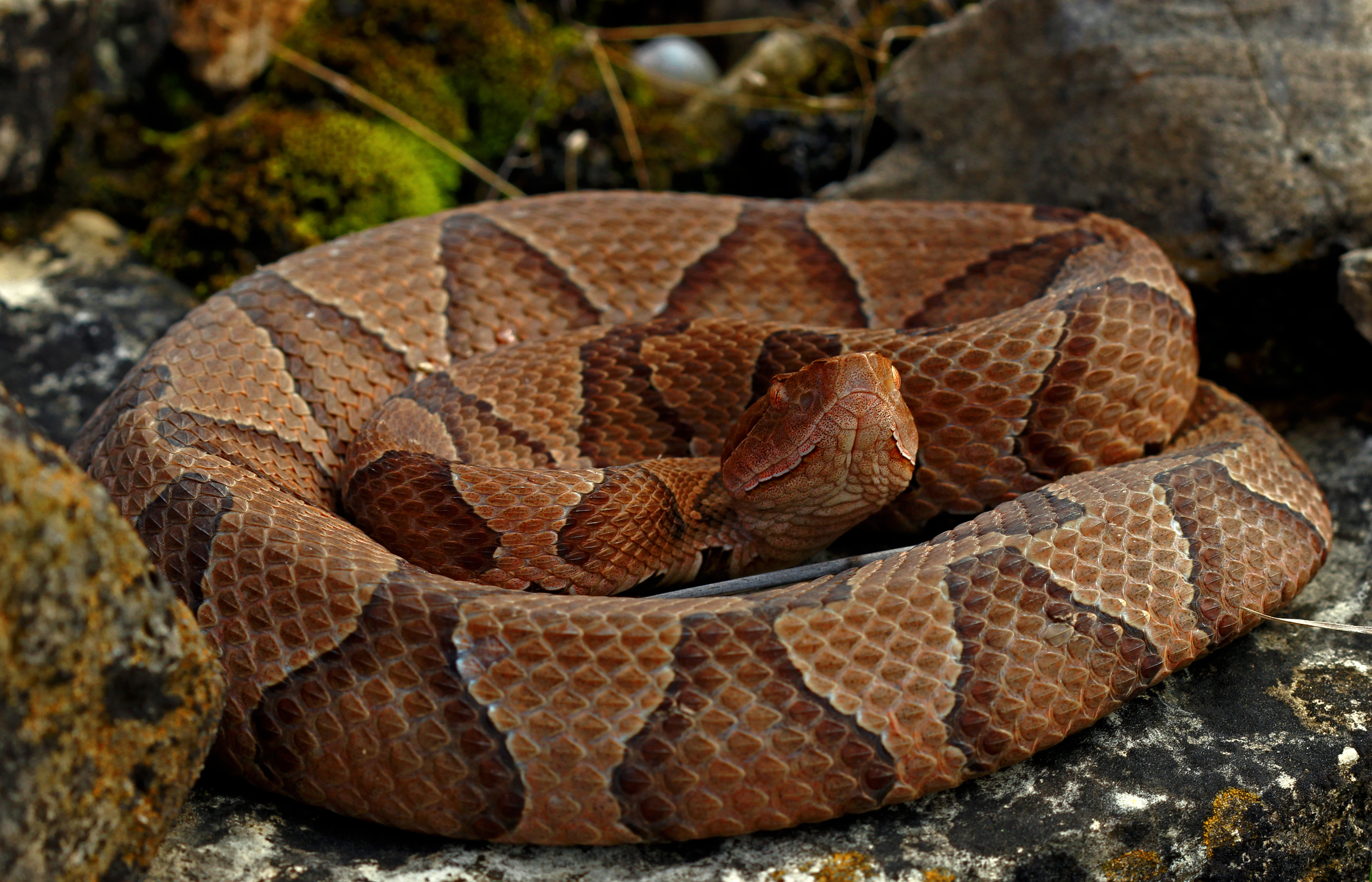
- Agkistrodon contortrix—eastern copperhead
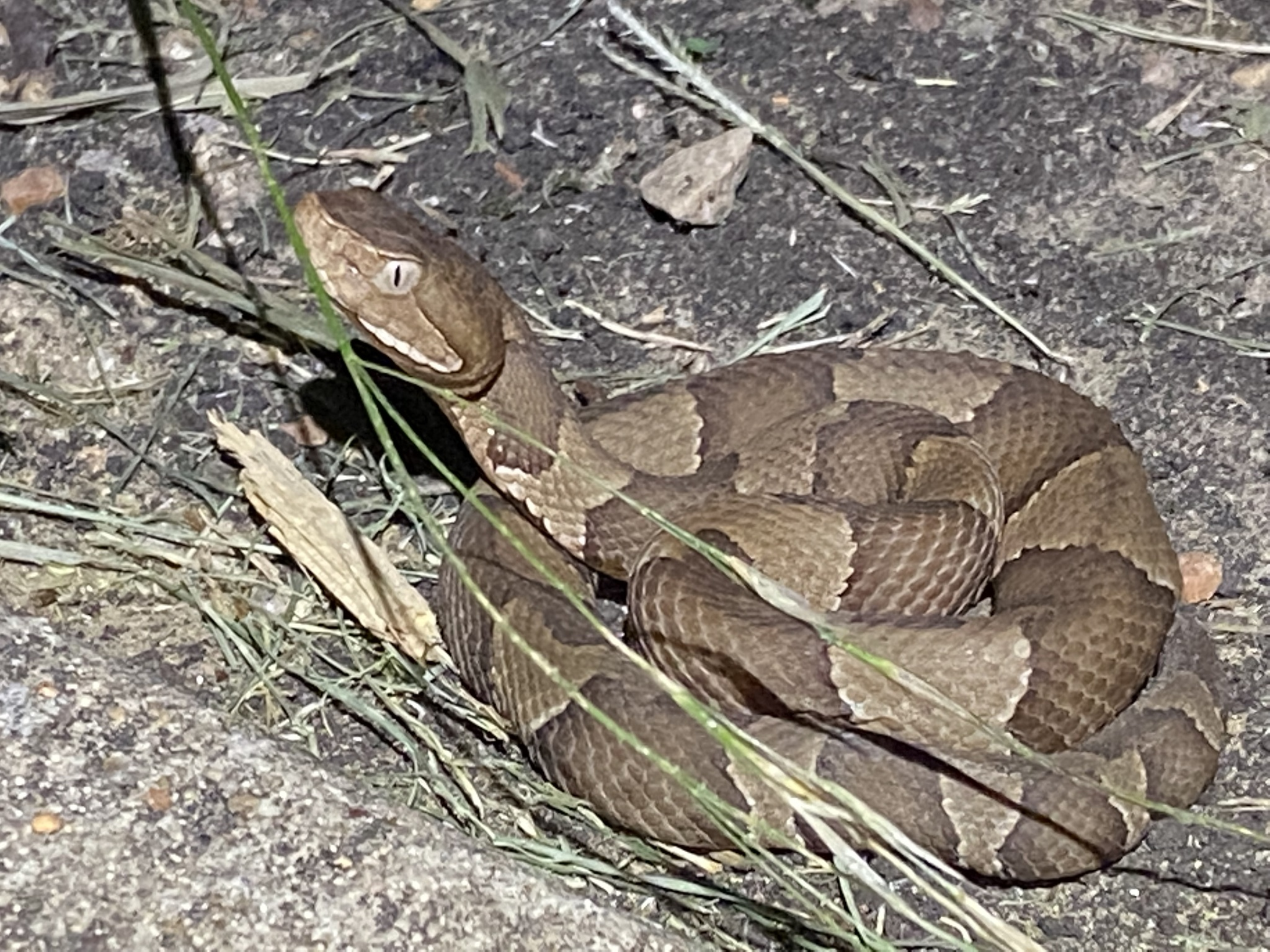
- A. laticinctus—broad-banded copperhead
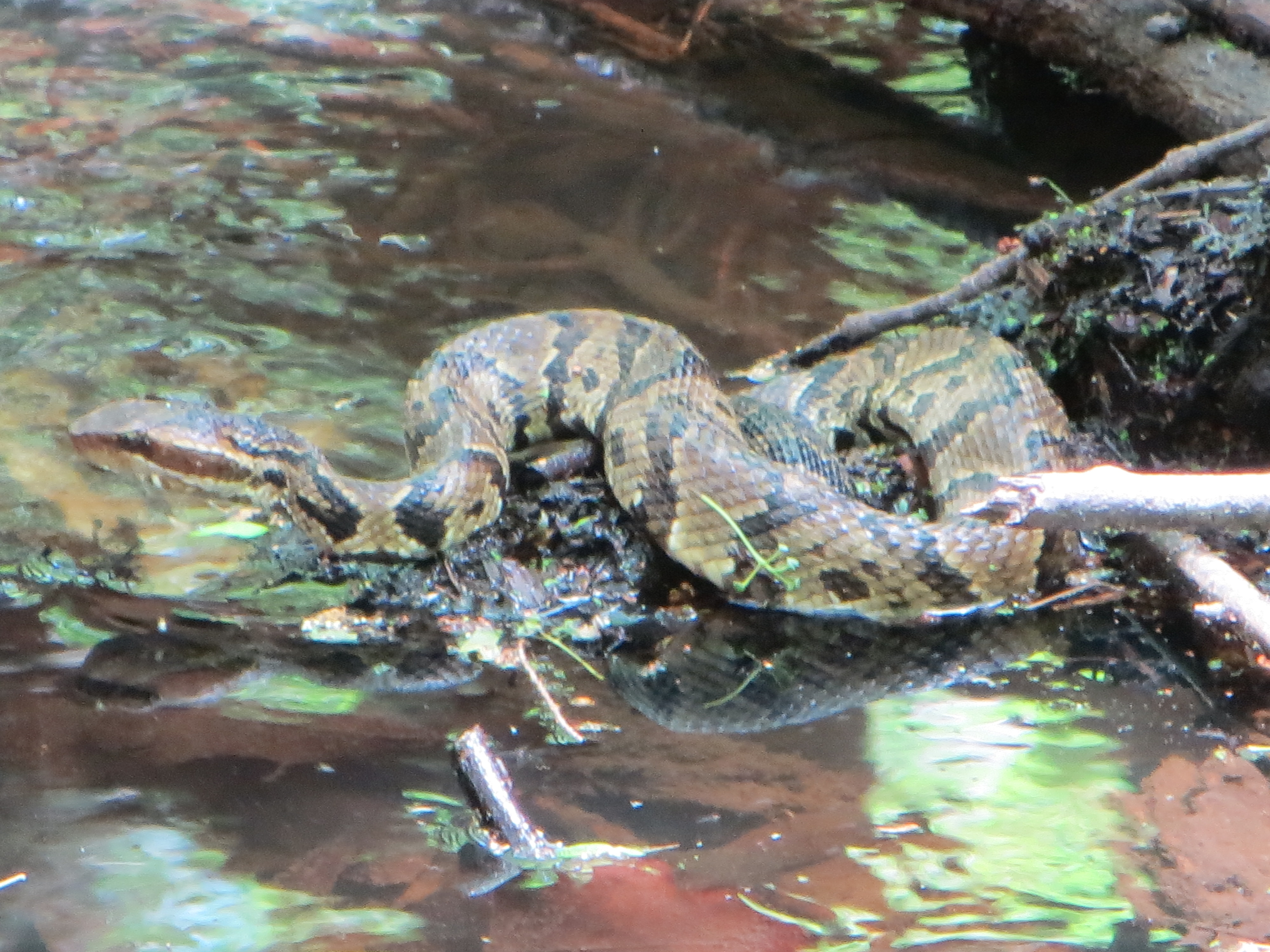
- A. piscivorus—cottonmouth or water moccasin
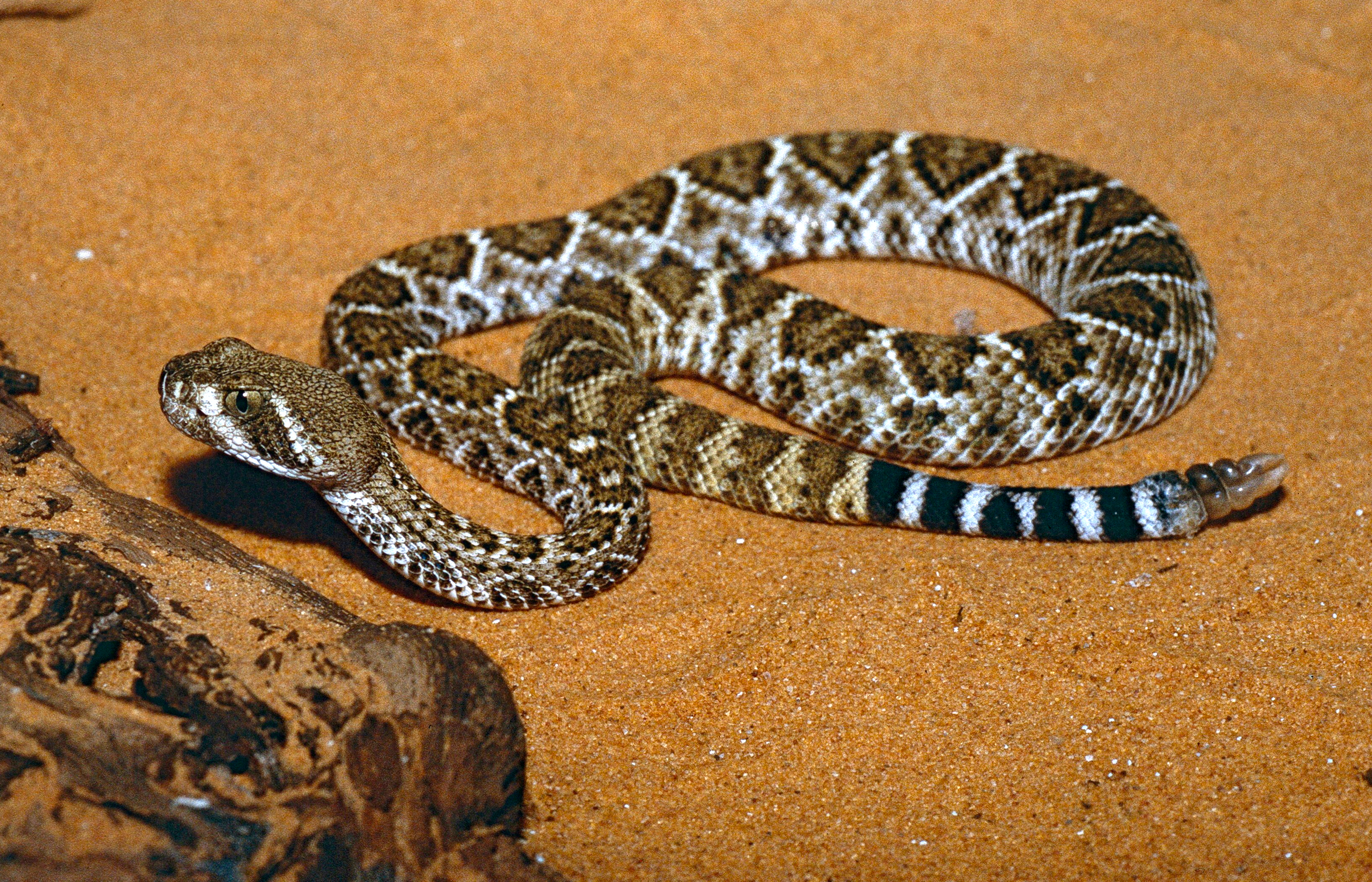
- Crotalus atrox—western diamond-back rattlesnake
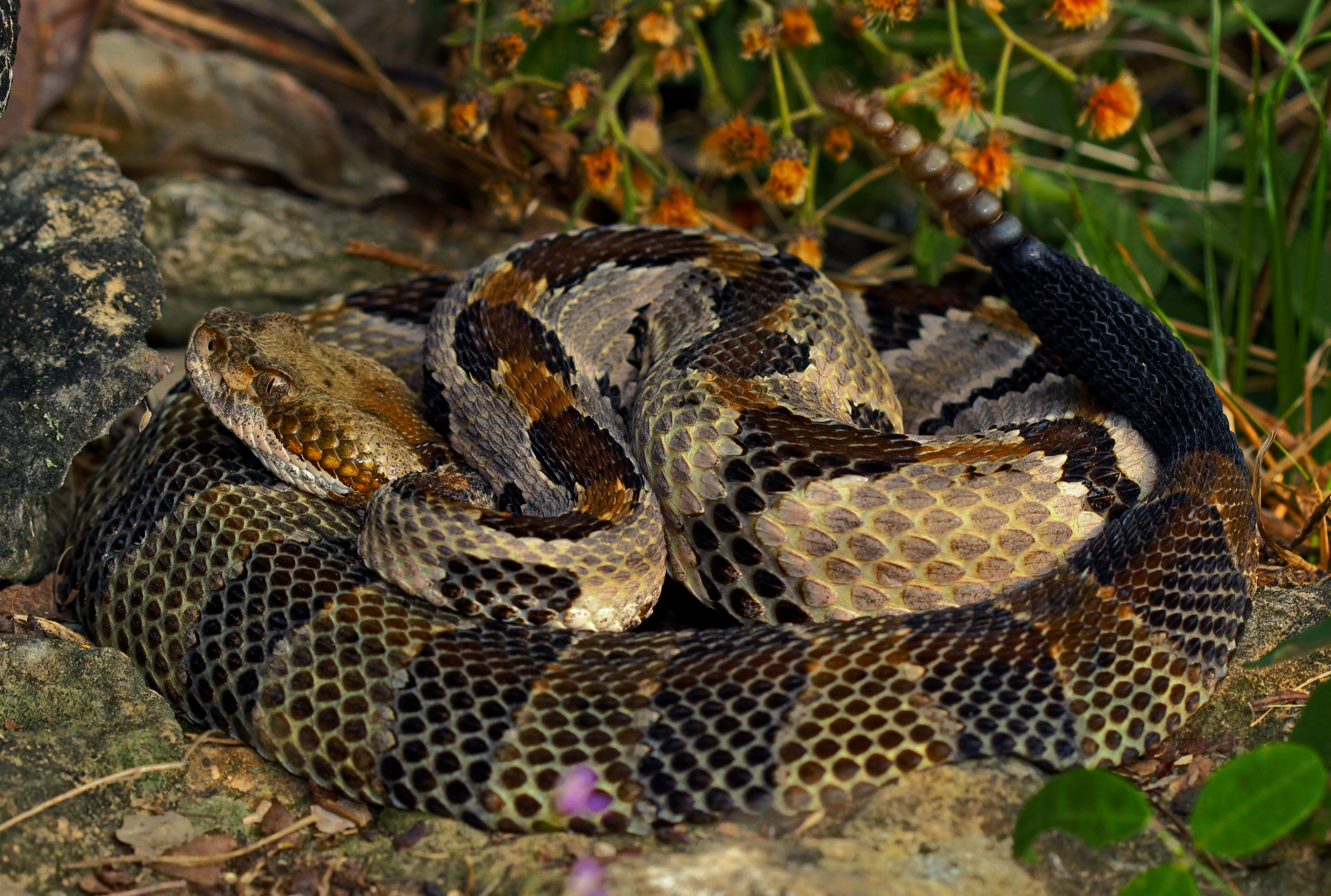
- C. horridus—timber rattlesnake
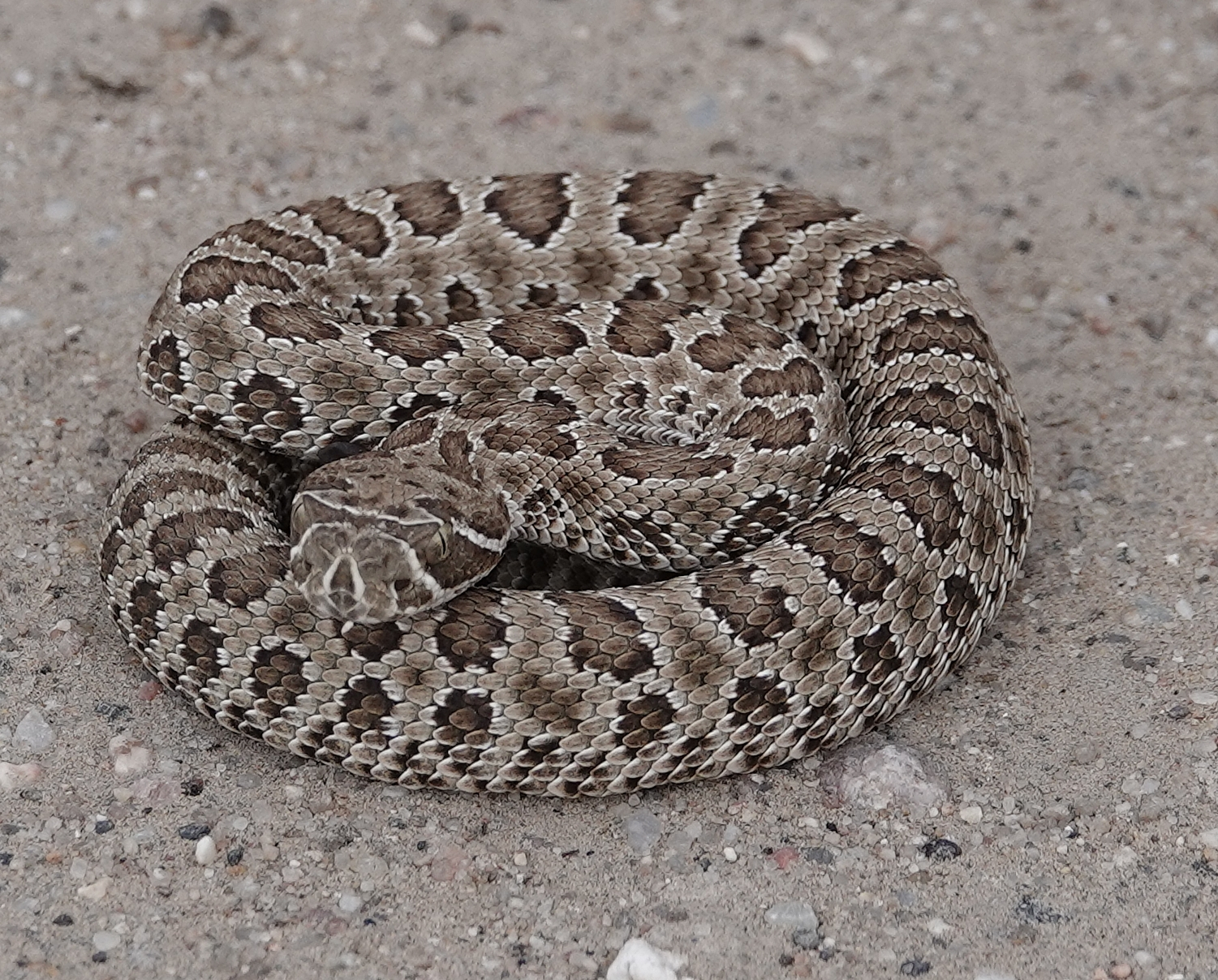
- C. viridis—prairie rattlesnake
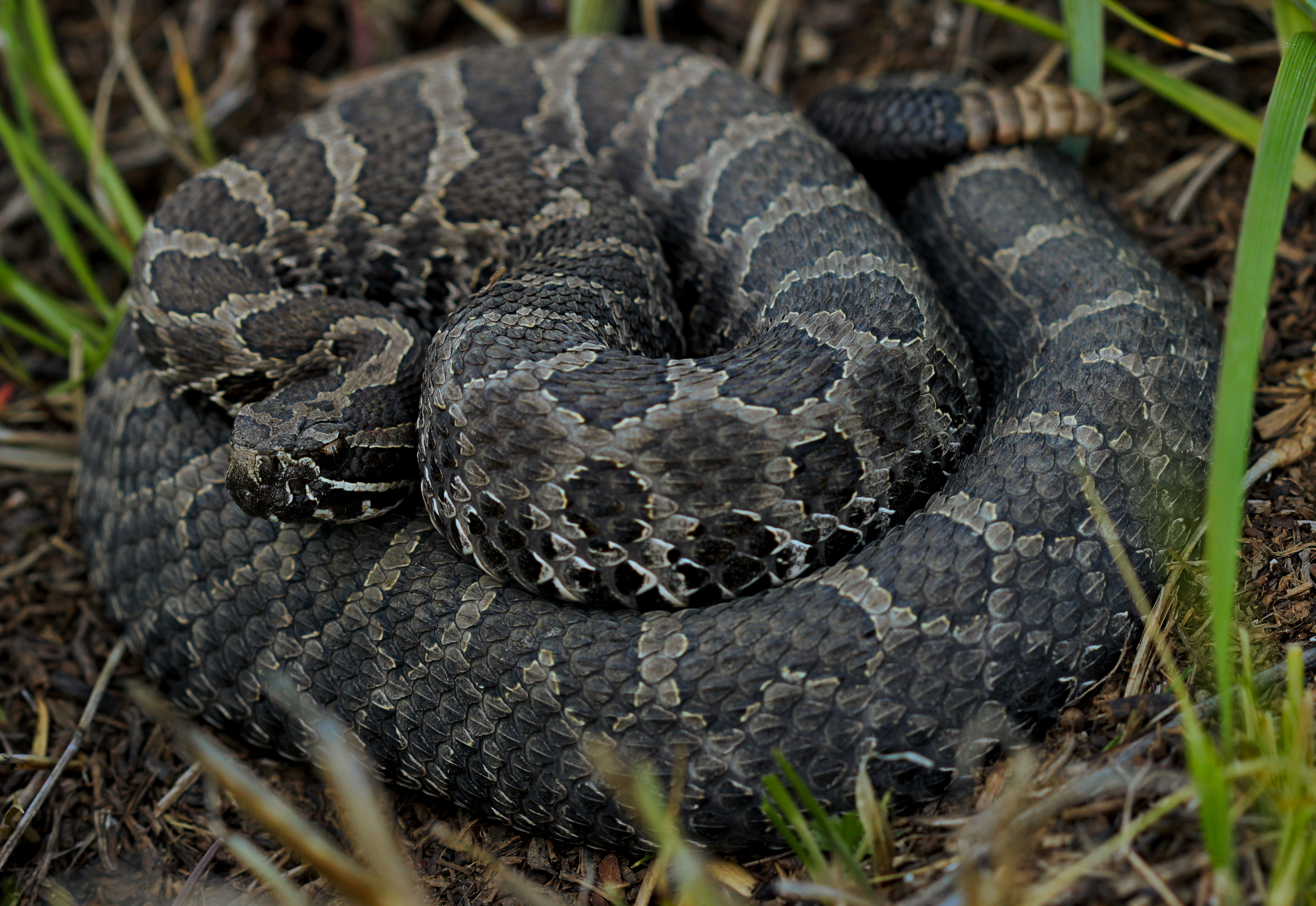
- Sistrurus tergeminus—western massasauga rattlesnake
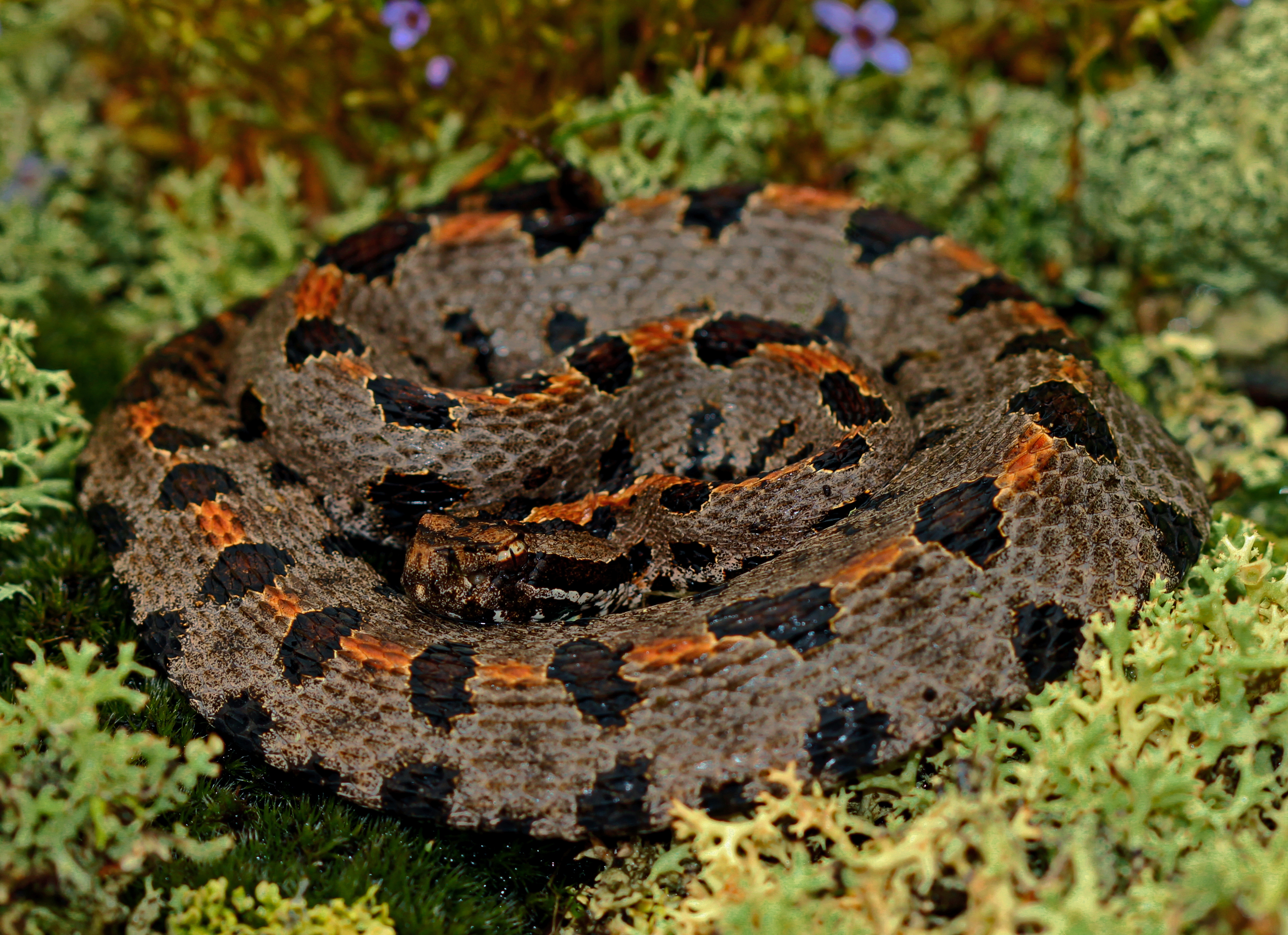
- S. miliarius—western pygmy rattlesnake
