= List of shipwrecks in the Lake Ontario National Marine Sanctuary =

Sanctuary location

The Lake Ontario National Marine Sanctuary is a United States National Marine Sanctuary on Lake Ontario off the coast of the U.S. state of New York. It protects 41 known historically significant shipwrecks spanning 200 years of American maritime history, as well as 19 potential shipwreck sites. One of the wrecks is listed on the National Register of Historic Places and one is listed as a New York State Submerged Cultural Preserve and Dive Site.

== Shipwrecks within the sanctuary ==
Ship	Ship type	Build date	Sunk date	Depth	Notes	Coordinates	NRHP status	Image
American	Wooden schooner	1870	1894		The schooner sank on October 1, 1894, off the coast of New York near Stony Point.	43.83493°N 076.43574°W	Not listed	
Bay State	Wooden screw steamer	1852	1862		The screw steamer, a cargo liner, broke up and sank in a storm west of Oswego, New York, on November 5, 1862, with the loss of all on board. (Various sources place the sinking on November 2.) A lifeboat, wreckage, and cargo from the ship washed ashore at Fair Haven, New York.	43.50153°N 076.53476°W	Not listed	
David W. Mills	Bulk carrier	1874	1919	16 to 20 feet (4.9 to 6.1 m)	The steam barge ran hard aground on Ford Shoal 4.5 miles (7.2 km) west of Oswego on August 11, 1919, when smoke from forest fires obscured Oswego Lighthouse. The wreck subsequently broke up in a violent storm and sank. It is listed as a New York State Submerged Cultural Preserve and Dive Site.	43°26.555′N 076°35.094′W	Not listed	
Ellsworth	Wooden steam barge	1869	1877	21 feet (6.4 m)	The schooner-rigged steam barge burned and sank on July 10, 1877, off the southeast point of Stony Island off the coast of New York. A partially successful salvage effort in 1879 resulted in the wreck breaking up.	43.916111°N 76.325833°W	Not listed	
Hartford	Wooden schooner	1873	1894	40 feet (12.2 m)	The three-masted schooner encountered a storm on October 12, 1894, and anchored in Mexico Bay near Oswego, but broke up and sank with the loss of all on board.		Not listed	
Queen of the Lake	Wooden scow schooner	1853	1906		The Canadian scow schooner encountered severe weather off the coast of New York about 10 miles (16 km) from Sodus Point and sank on November 1, 1906.	43.2955°N 076.9687°W	Not listed	
Roberval	Steel steam barge	1907	1916	330 feet (100.6 m)	Foundered on September 25, 1916, while hauling a deckload of lumber from Cape Vincent, New York, to Oswego. Fell into the trough between waves mid–lake, causing the cargo to shift, and Roberval to founder. Two of the crew were killed. Wreck located in 2022.	43.685039°N 76.584883°W	Not listed	
St. Peter	Wooden schooner	1873	1898	117 feet (35.7 m)	On October 27, 1898, the 135.7-foot (41.4 m) three-masted schooner sank in a storm off Bear Creek on the coast of New York, just west of Sodus Bay and northeast of Pultneyville, New York.	43°18′42″N 077°07′52″W	Listed	
Three Brothers	Wooden schooner	1827	1833		The daggerboard schooner disappeared in a storm after departing Oswego on November 12, 1833, bound for Pultneyville, New York. Her wreck was discovered in 2014 off the coast of New York off Nine Mile Point.	43.52178°N 076.57229°W	Not listed	
Washington (also Lady Washington)	Wooden sloop	1797	1803		On November 6, 1803, the Canadian sloop departed Niagara, Ontario, bound for Kingston, Ontario. She disappeared in a severe storm with the loss of all on board. Wreckage from Washington washed up on the coast near Oswego on November 7. Her wreck, discovered near Oswego in June 2016, is the earliest known shipwreck in the sanctuary.	43.43638°N 076.70535°W	Not listed	

== See also ==
- List of Great Lakes shipwrecks on the National Register of Historic Places
- List of shipwrecks in the Great Lakes
