= Braddock Point Light =

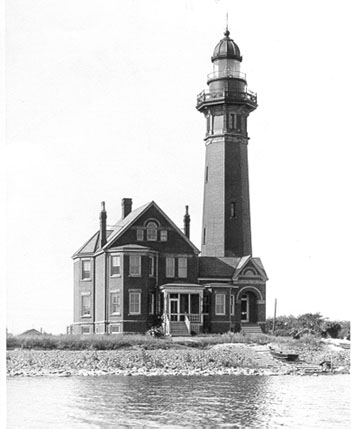
- Location: Bogus Point on Lake Ontario
- Coordinates: 43°20′28″N 77°45′45″W

Tower
- Constructed: 1896
- Construction: Brick
- Automated: 1954
- Height: 50 feet (15 m) (Original height 97 feet (30 m))
- Shape: Octagonal w/ Faux Lantern
- Markings: Red

Light
- First lit: 1896
- Deactivated: 1954
- Focal height: 55 feet (17 m)
- Lens: Third and half order fresnel lens
- Range: 15 nautical miles (28 km; 17 mi)
- Characteristic: Iso W 6s - Isophase White light 6s

Braddock Point Light was a lighthouse just west of Braddock Bay at Bogus Point on Lake Ontario in New York.

== History ==
The lighthouse was established and lit in 1896 and was deactivated in 1954. The lighthouse was constructed out of red brick, with an octagonal tower. The lantern portion of the tower was removed from an 1870s lighthouse in Cleveland, Ohio and moved to Braddock in 1895. The original lens, installed in 1896, was a third-and-half-order Fresnel lens. The upper two-thirds of the tower was removed by the Coast Guard in 1954 due to structural damage.

The Coast Guard reactivated the light on February 28, 1999. The lighthouse is now privately owned and has opened as a bed and breakfast. The lighthouse was put up for sale in November 2014 by owners Donald and Nandy Town.
