= Rochester Basin =

Deepest part of Lake Ontario

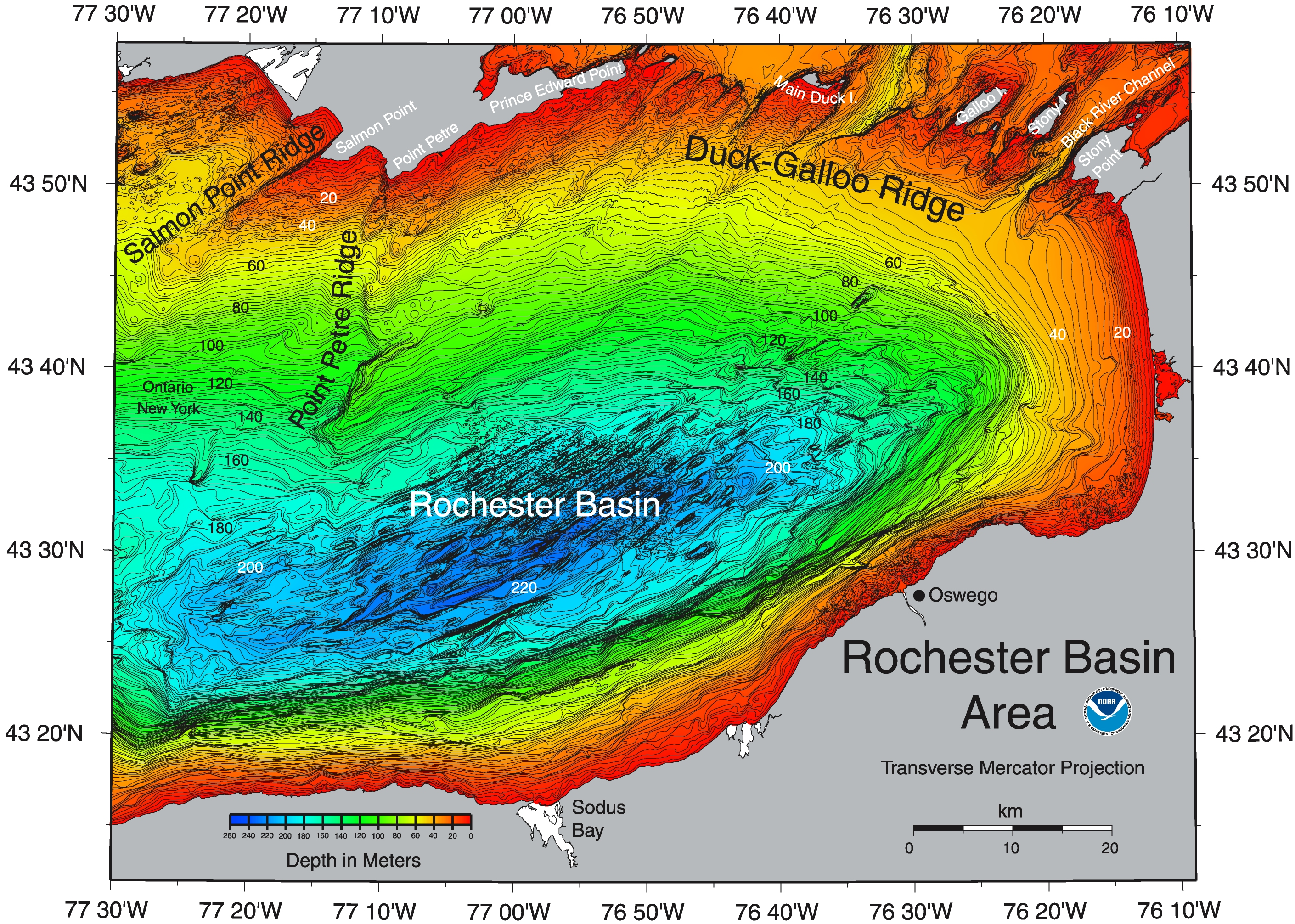

The Rochester Basin, at 802 feet (244 m), is the deepest part of Lake Ontario. The lake bottom of the Rochester Basin is strongly marked by glaciation, with parallel gouges and underwater drumlins.
