= Stony Point (Henderson) Light =

Stony Point Light
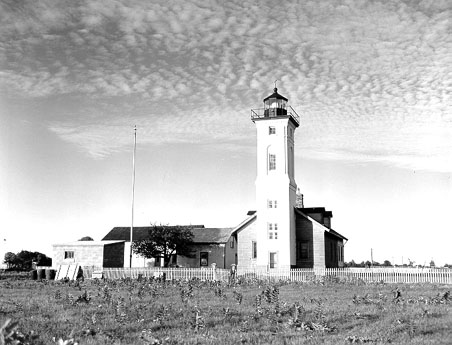
- Location: New York, U.S.
- Coordinates: 43°50′22″N 76°17′54″W

Tower
- Construction: Brick
- Automated: 1950
- Height: 73 feet (22 m)
- Shape: Square
- Markings: White w/ Black Lantern

Light
- First lit: 1869
- Deactivated: 1945
- Lens: Fourth Order Fresnel lens

The Stony Point (Henderson) Light is a lighthouse on the shore of Lake Ontario near Henderson Bay in New York. The site was established in 1826, and the original lighthouse was lit in 1869. The light and attached keeper's quarters are currently privately owned. A new light was built in 1945, and it was automated in 1950. This light is maintained by the US Coast Guard. The site is not open to the public.

== History ==
Stony Point (Henderson) Light is listed as one of New York's Historic Light Stations.
