= Lake Ontario National Marine Sanctuary =

Marine sanctuary in southeastern Lake Ontario

- IUCN category V (protected landscape/seascape)
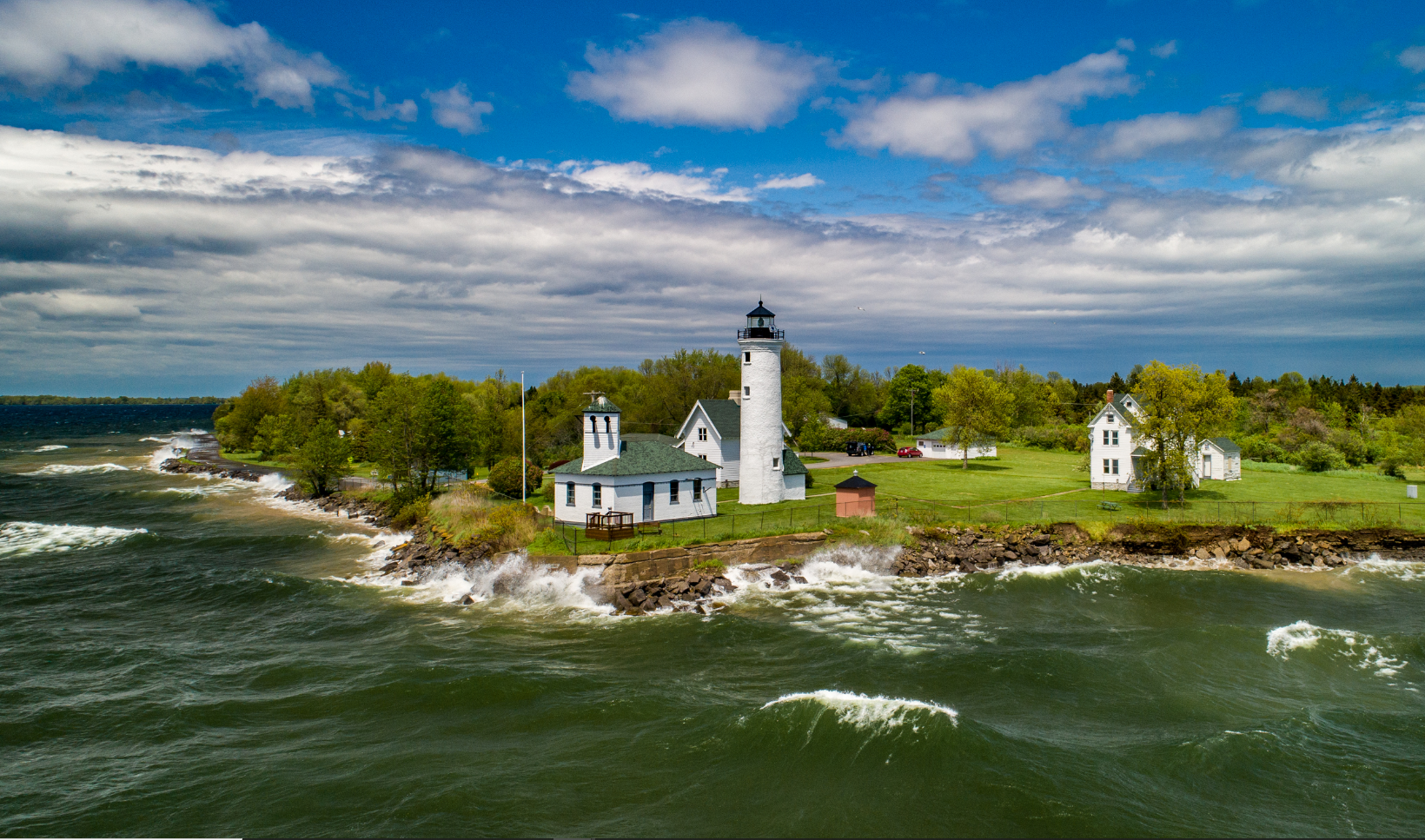
- Tibbetts Point Light in Cape Vincent, New York overlooks the eastern boundary of the Lake Ontario National Marine Sanctuary where Lake Ontario meets the St. Lawrence River.
- Interactive map of Lake Ontario National Marine Sanctuary
- Location: Southeastern Lake Ontario off New York
- Coordinates: 43°31′N 76°44′W
- Area: 1,722 sq mi (4,460 km^{2})
- Established: September 6, 2024; 2 years ago
- Governing body: NOAA Office of National Marine Sanctuaries
- Website: sanctuaries.noaa.gov/news/press/lake-ontario/

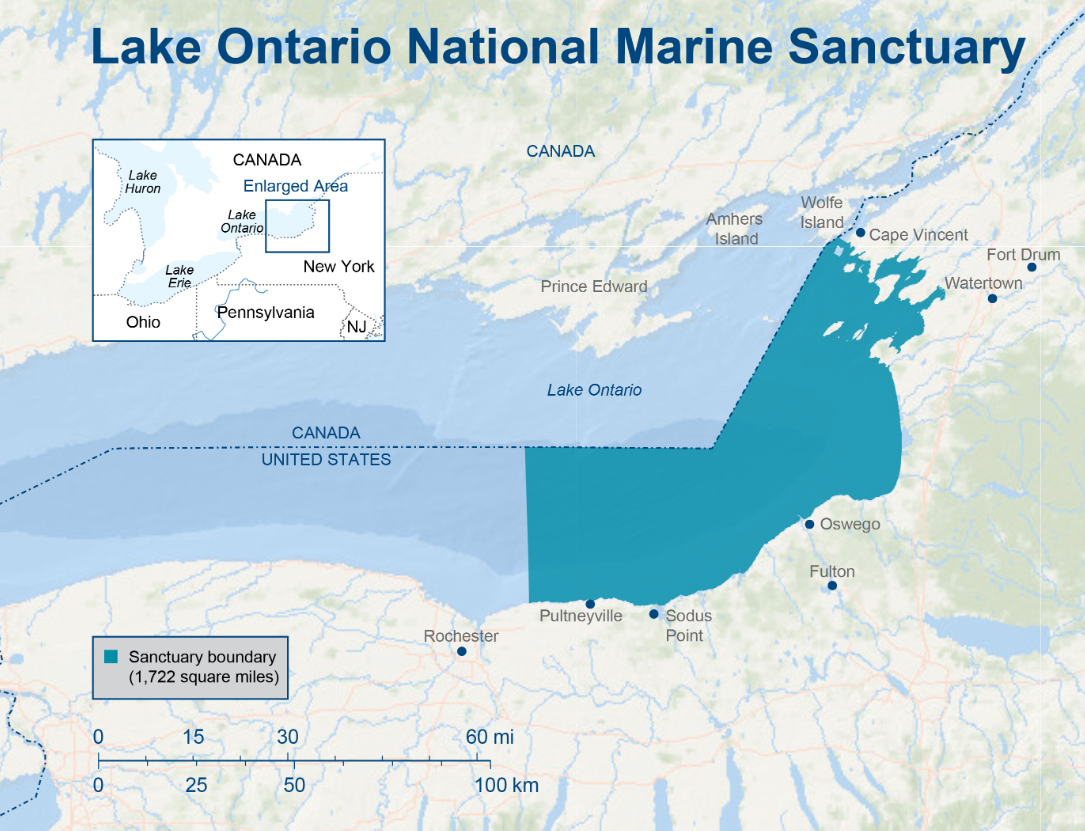
A 2024 map of the Lake Ontario National Marine Sanctuary.

The Lake Ontario National Marine Sanctuary is a National Marine Sanctuary in the waters of the United States, located in southeastern Lake Ontario off the coast of New York. It was designated on September 6, 2024, by the National Oceanic and Atmospheric Administration (NOAA). It protects the area's maritime cultural history, including historic shipwrecks, and areas of great cultural, historical, and spiritual importance to Native American peoples of the Haudenosaunee Confederacy. It offers opportunities for research, community engagement, education and outreach activities, and maritime-heritage-related tourism.

The Lake Ontario National Marine Sanctuary was the 16th national marine sanctuary and third on the Great Lakes, as well as the first in the waters of the State of New York. It was the first national marine sanctuary created since the Wisconsin Shipwreck Coast National Marine Sanctuary in 2021. It held the status of newest national marine sanctuary for only five weeks, until the designation of the Chumash Heritage National Marine Sanctuary on October 11, 2024.

== Geography ==
The Lake Ontario National Marine Sanctuary encompasses 1,722 square miles (1,300 sq nmi; 4,460 km^{2}) of southeastern Lake Ontario and its coastline. It lies off New York state along the coasts of Jefferson, Oswego, Cayuga, and Wayne counties. and extends into the lake to the international border with Canada.

== Indigenous culture and heritage ==
The first inhabitants of the region were indigenous people who began using the waters of southeastern Lake Ontario for transportation and trade in canoes and other small boats in prehistoric times. They were the ancestors of the Onondaga people, Cayuga people, Seneca people, and Oneida people, portions of whose homelands lie within the boundaries of the sanctuary. By around 1000 CE, these distinct cultural groups had unified as the Haudenosaunee Confederacy, which the Tuscarora people also joined in 1722. Over many centuries, these indigenous peoples developed a deep and lasting understanding of and bond with Lake Ontario and its fish and wildlife. The sanctuary's waters remain a place of cultural, spiritual and historical significance to the peoples of the Haudenosaunee Confederacy, and its waters may include archaeological sites containing Native American artifacts.

== American maritime history ==
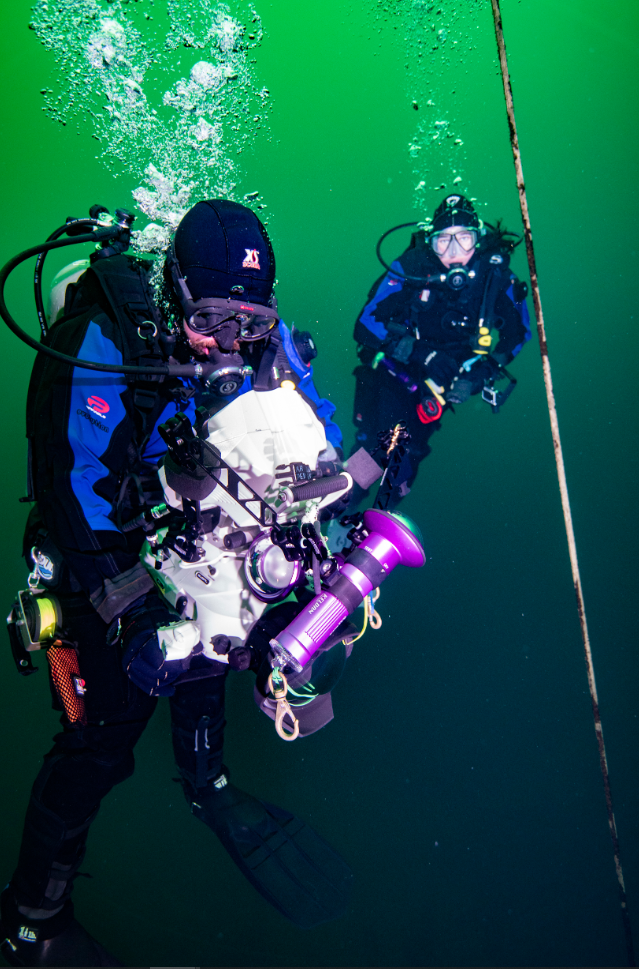
Divers film the wreck of the schooner St. Peter on June 13, 2019.

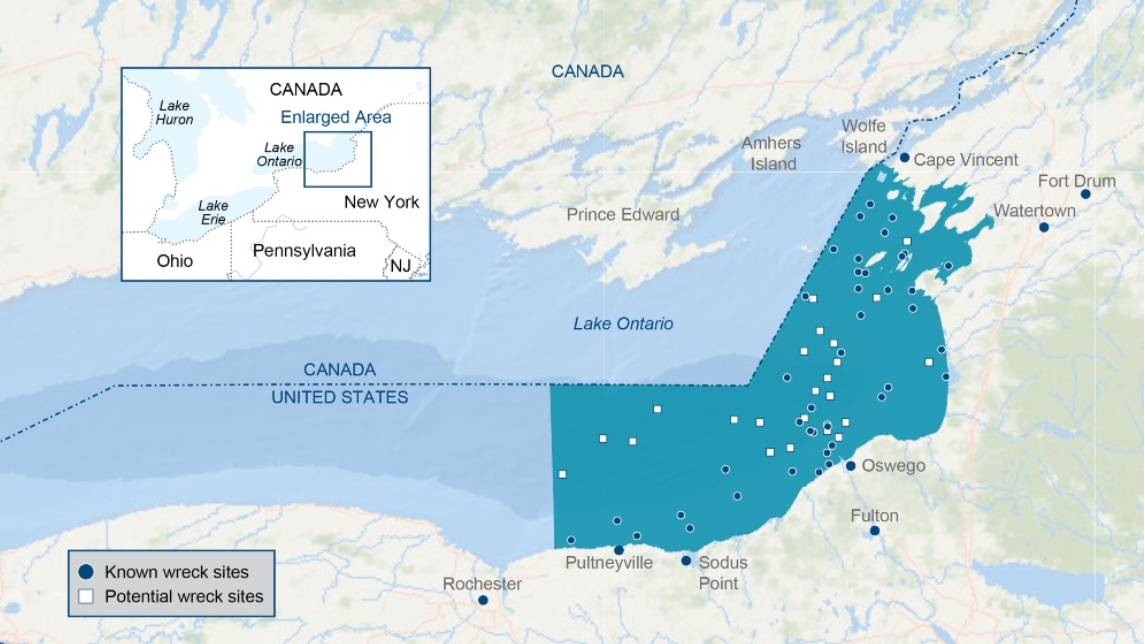
Blue dots indicate known shipwrecks as of 2024. White dots are potential shipwreck sites awaiting investigation.

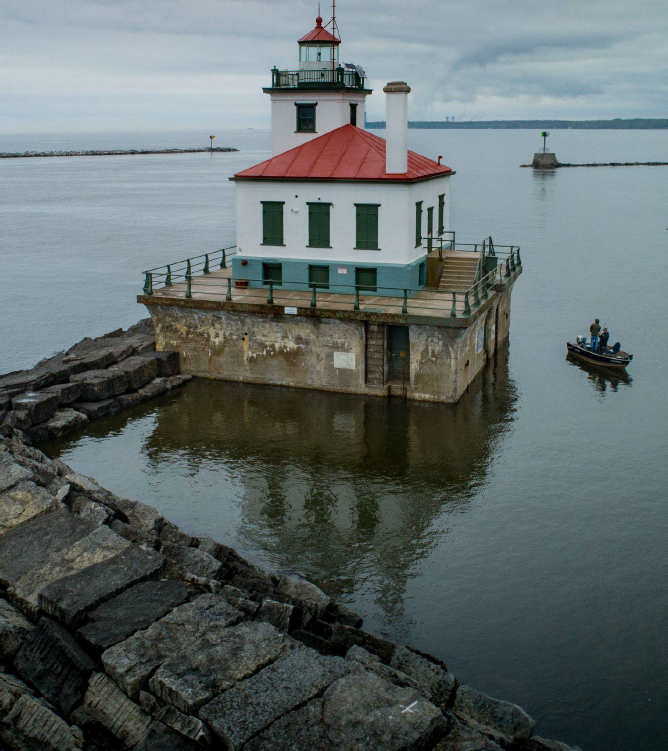
Oswego Harbor West Pierhead Light at Oswego, New York.

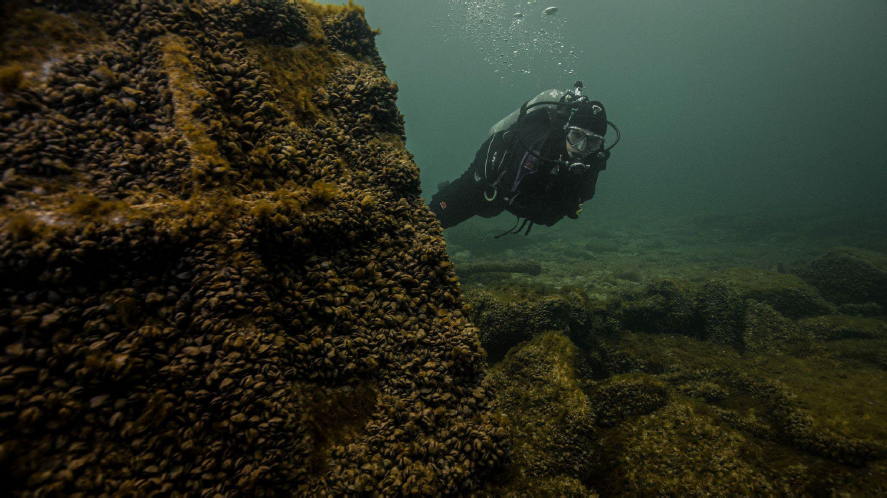
A diver visits a shipwreck in what later became the sanctuary.

Since the early days of European exploration of North America, Europeans, and later Americans, have traversed the waters of southeastern Lake Ontario. Scuba divers and shipwreck explorers have identified 41 shipwrecks and the wreckage of one aircraft within the boundaries of the Lake Ontario National Marine Sanctuary which together span more than 200 years of the history of the United States, including the role of Lake Ontario in supporting the growth of the industrial core of the early United States. At the time of the sanctuary's designation in 2024, historical records suggested that an additional 19 shipwrecks and three wrecked aircraft lie within it. The shipwrecks provide historians and maritime archaeologists with insights into maritime innovations of the past, the history of trade and transportation on Lake Ontario, the shipbuilders who constructed the ships, the sailors and passengers aboard them, and the communities they served, as well as the lake's role in military conflicts. The shipwrecks include some of the oldest in the Great Lakes and are among the best-preserved in the world, and even the oldest of them is in pristine condition thanks to the cold fresh water of Lake Ontario.

Among shipwrecks within the sanctuary's boundaries is that of the oldest known commercial sailing vessel in Lake Ontario, Washington, which operated from 1797 to 1803. The wreck of the 135-foot (41 m) three-masted schooner St. Peter, which operated from 1873 until she sank in a storm in 1898, sits upright in 117 feet (36 m) of water on the lake bottom northeast of Pultneyville, New York; it is one of the most accessible shipwrecks for recreational divers in the sanctuary and is listed on the National Register of Historic Places. The wrecked aircraft is a World War II-era Beechcraft C-45 Expeditor light transport. The sanctuary also may contain several other underwater archaeological sites related to the region's maritime history in addition to the wrecks, such as the remnants of shipwrecks, piers, and navigational aids.

The wreck of St. Peter

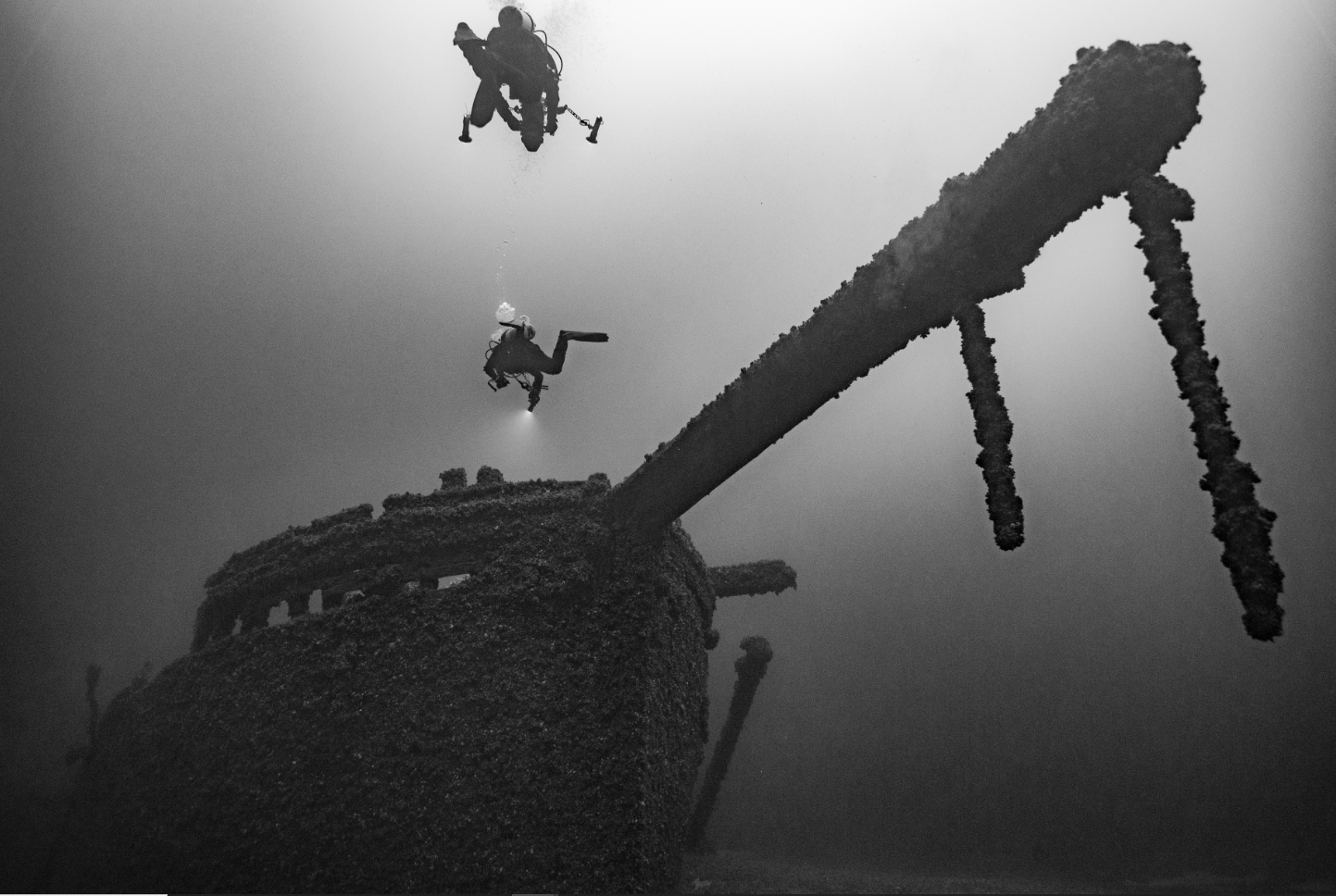

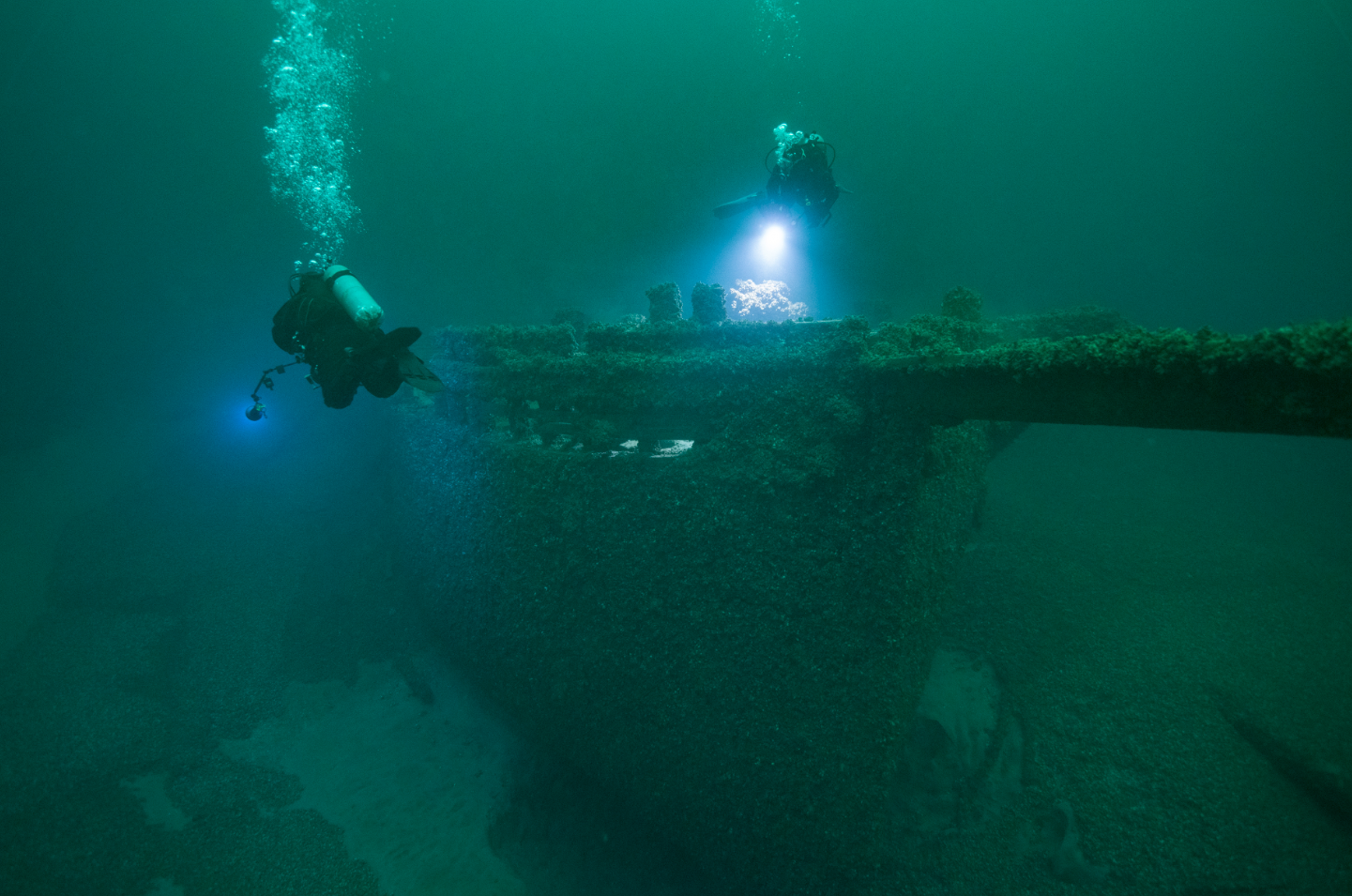

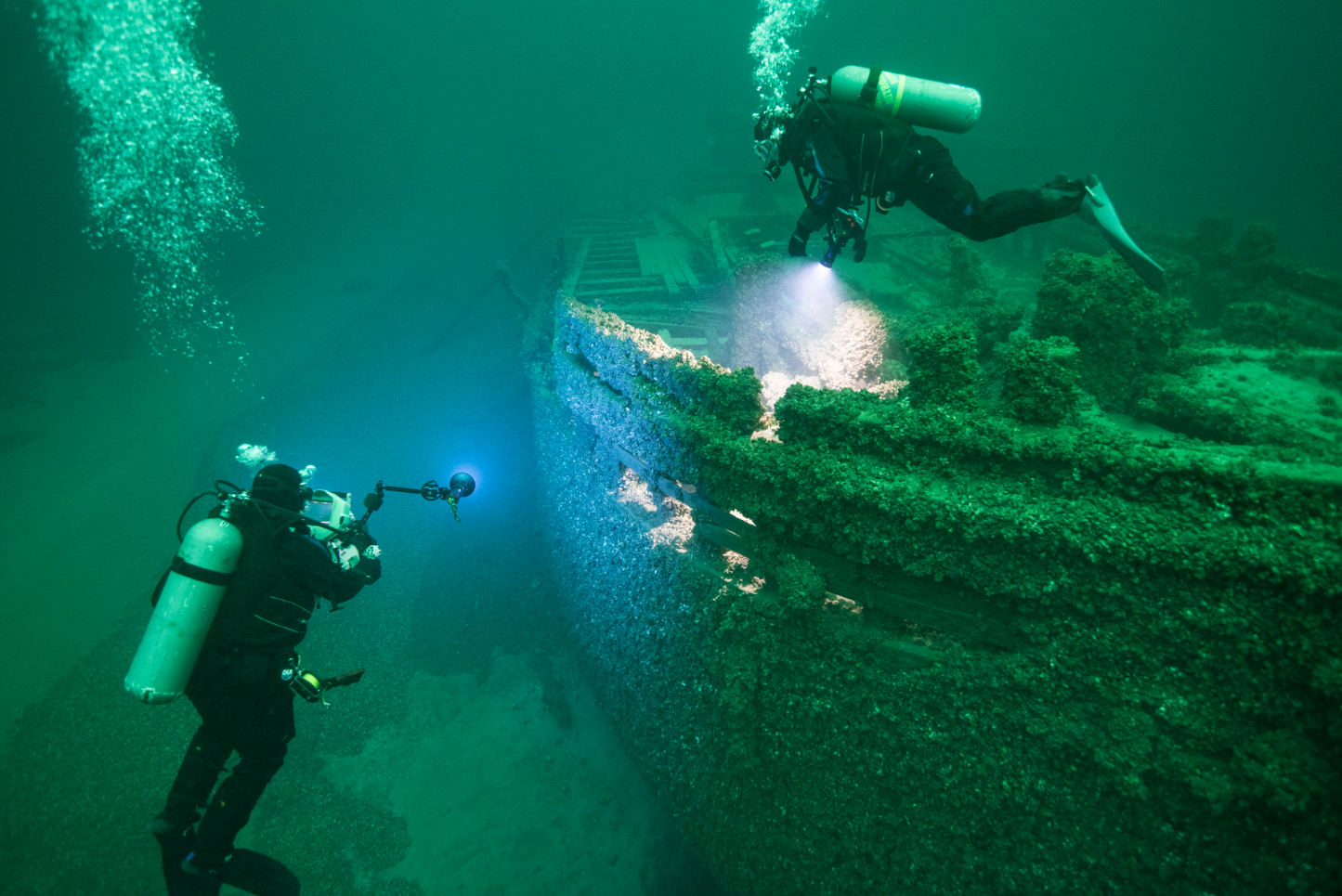

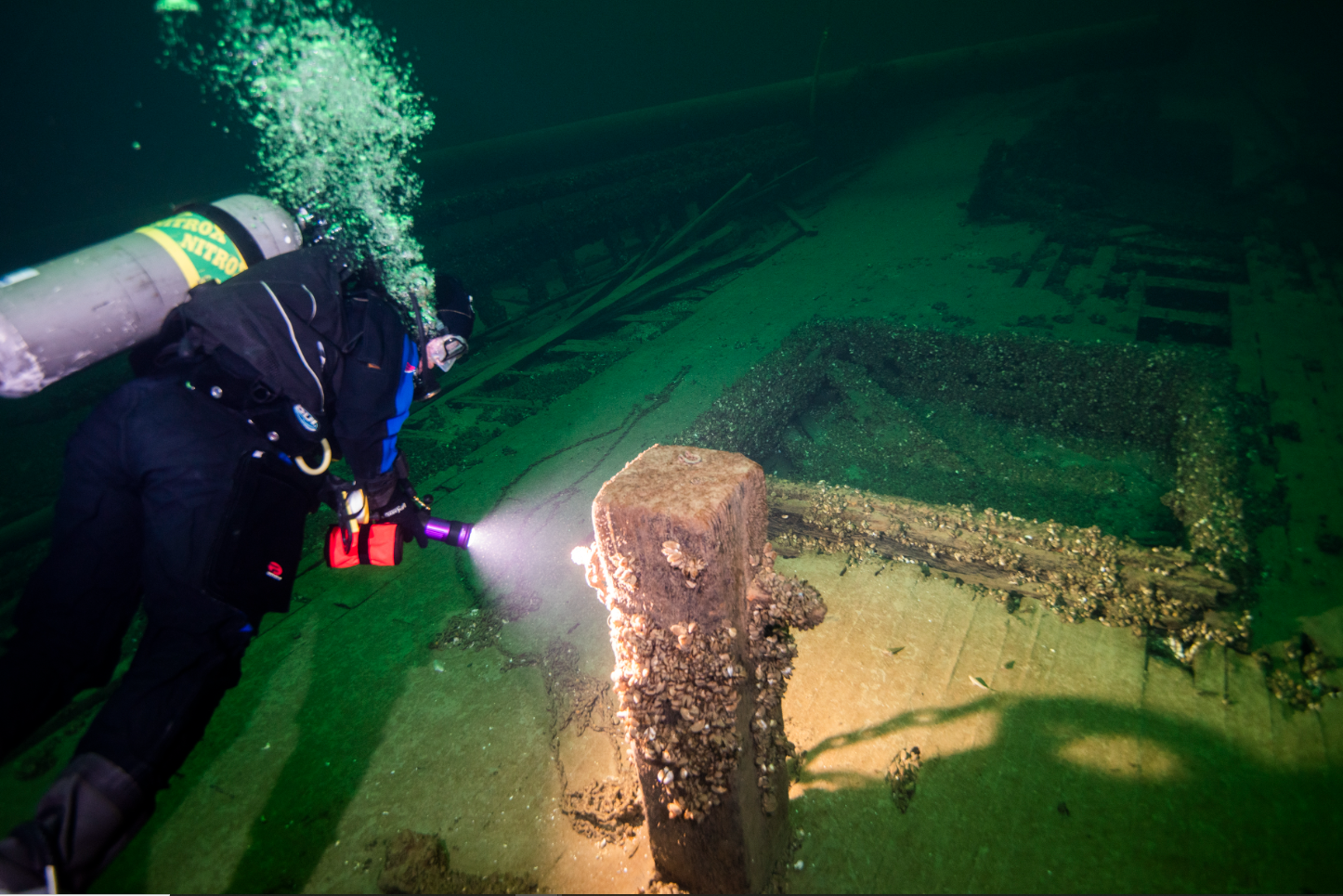

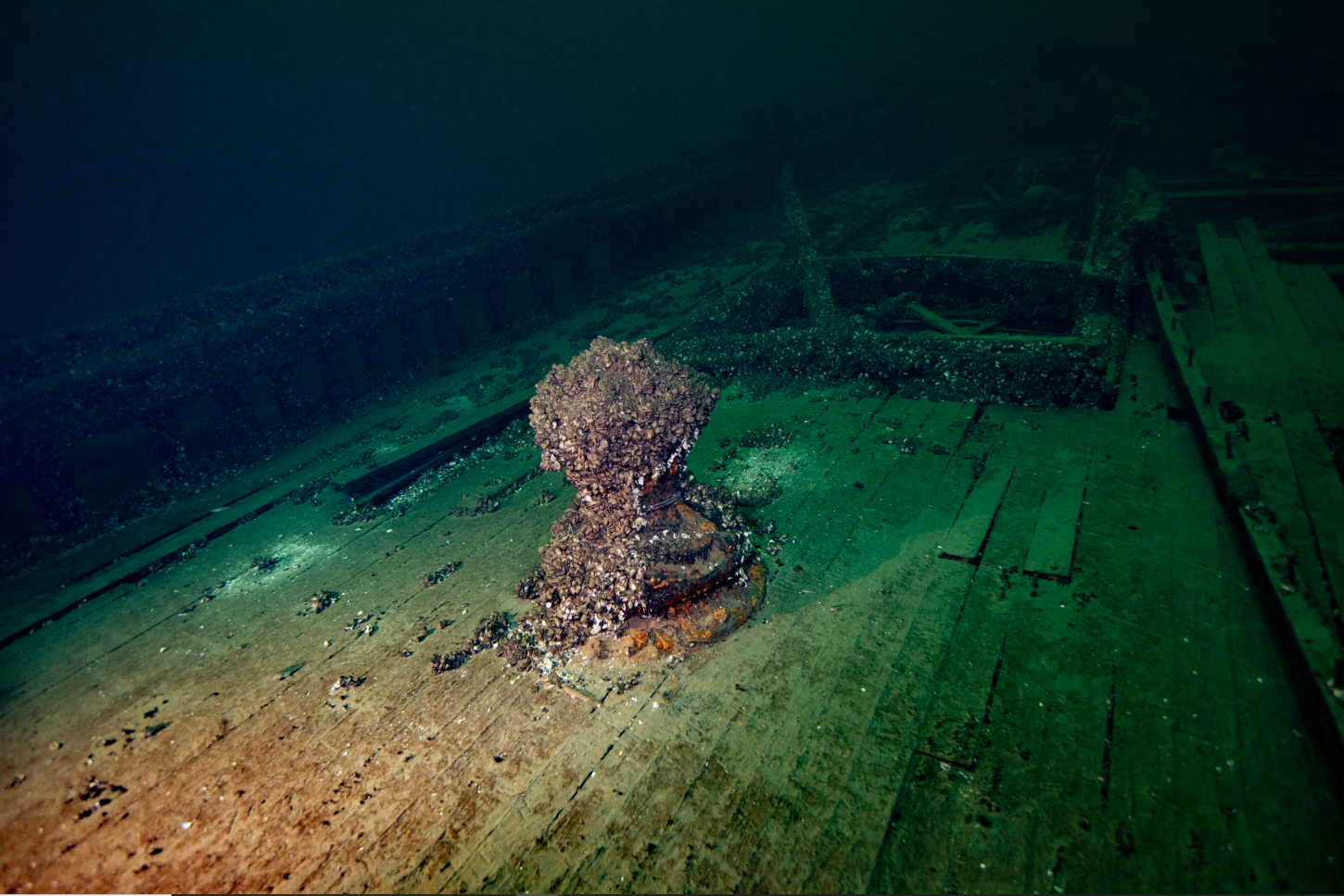

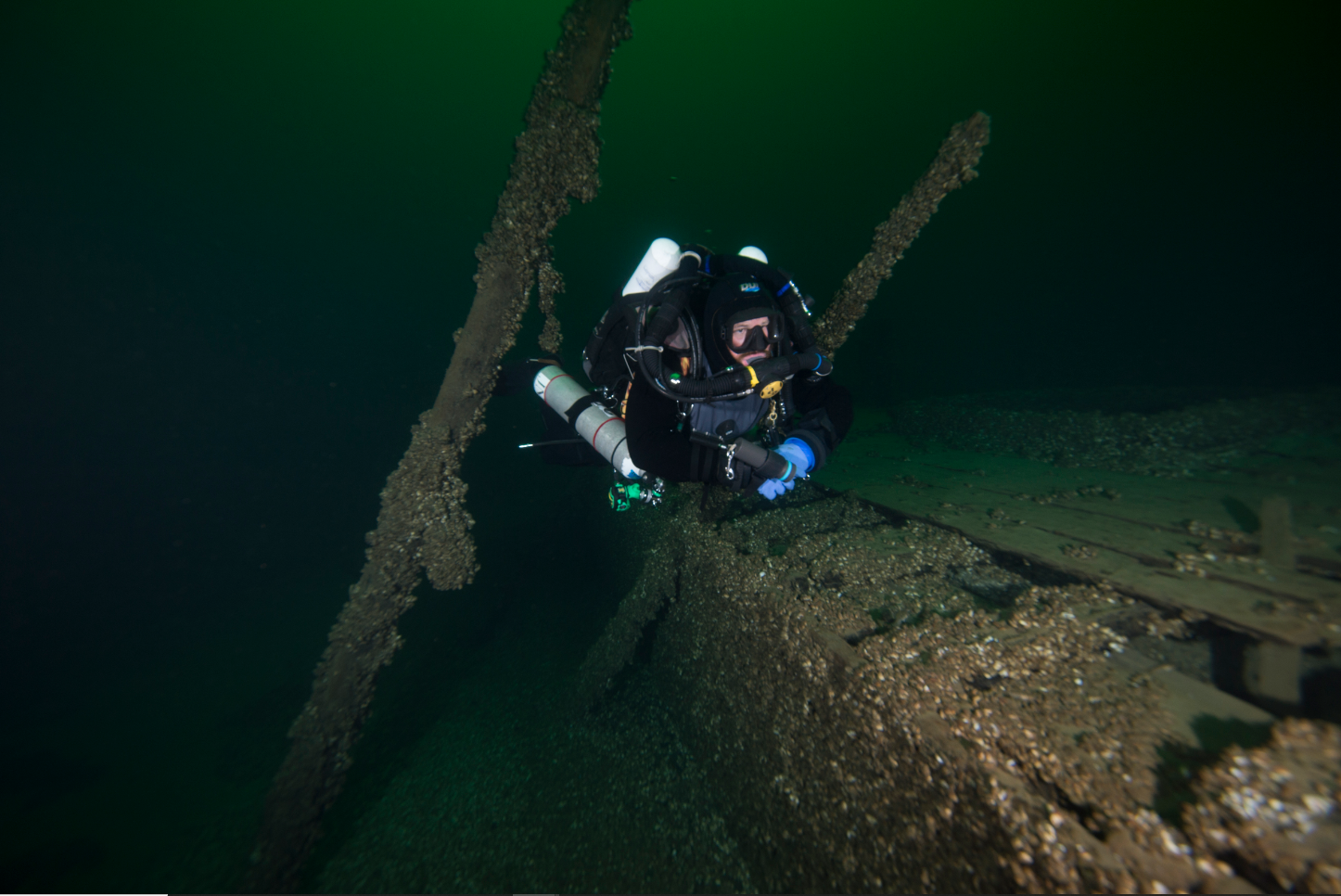

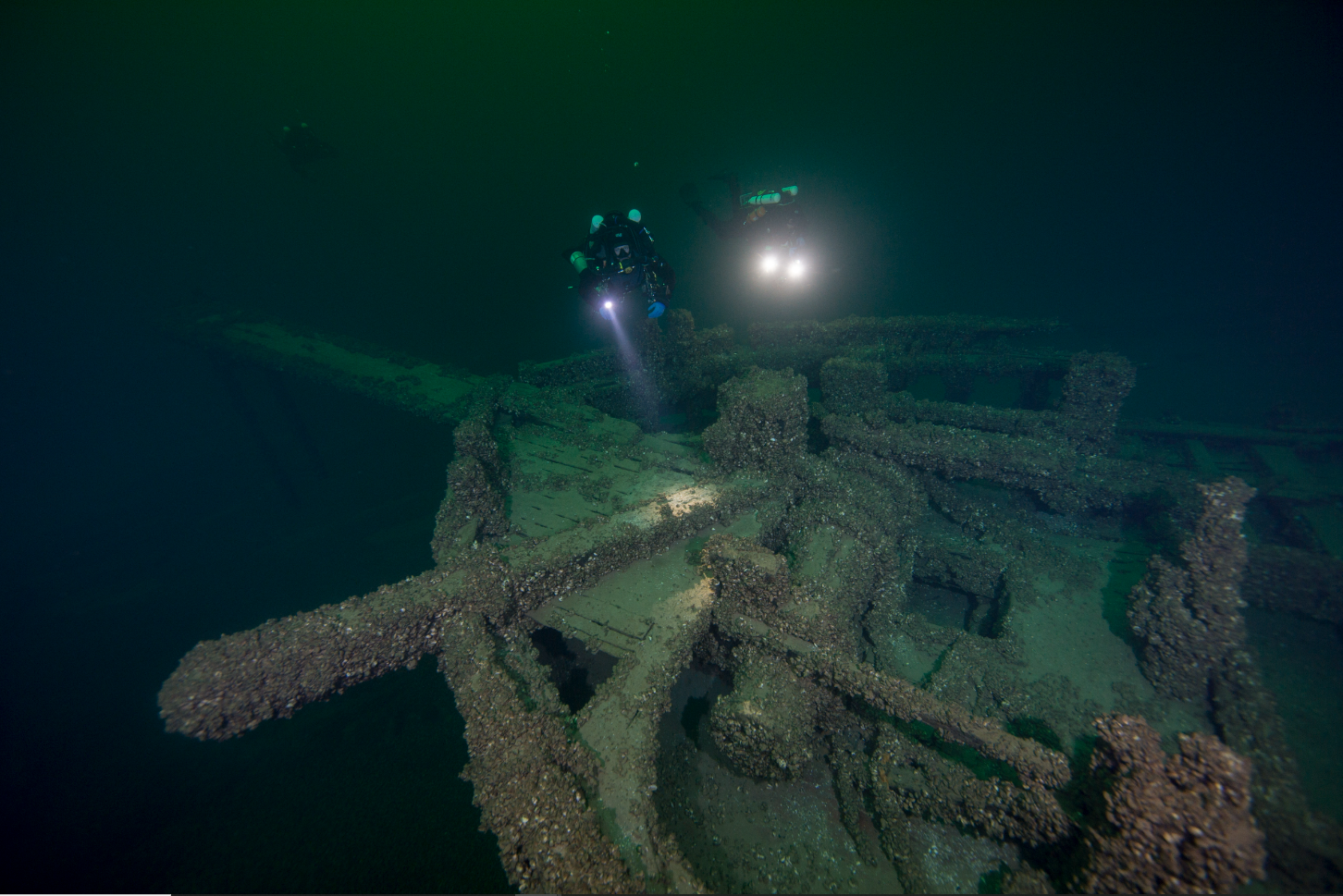

== Designation history ==
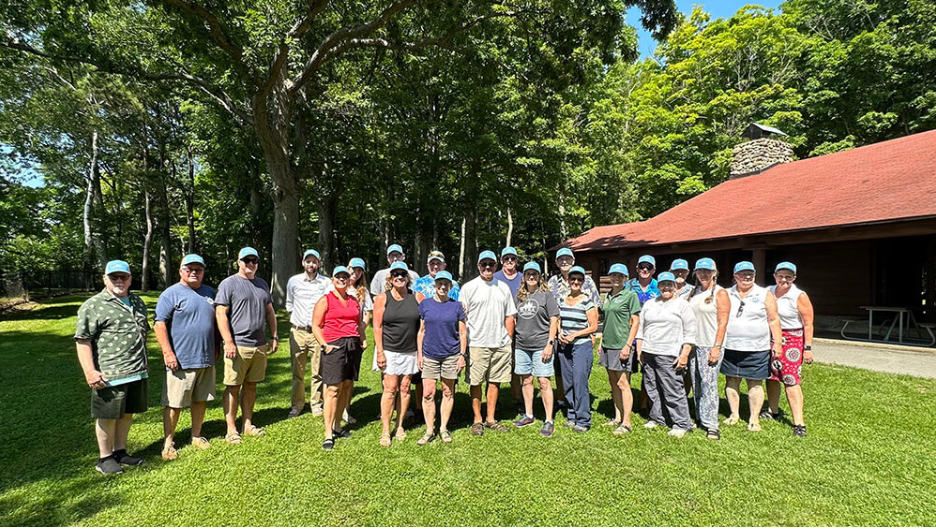
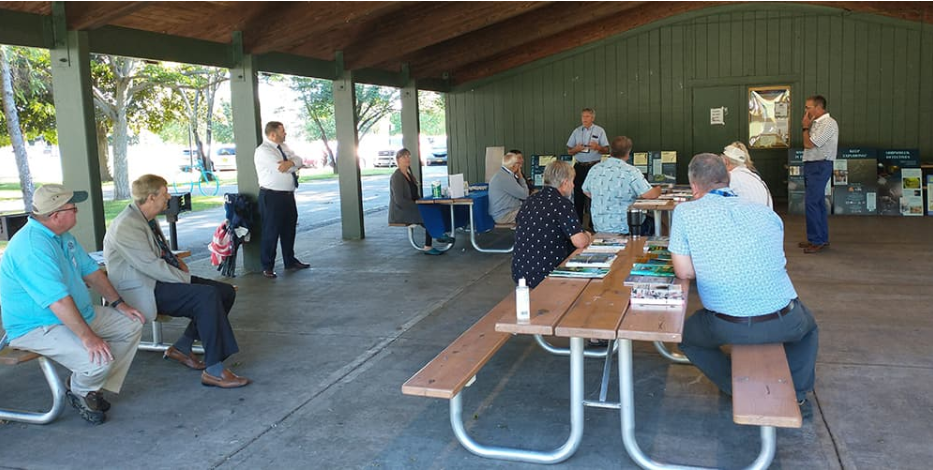
TOP: The pre-designation Sanctuary Advisory Council. ABOVE: An informal council gathering.

The designation process for the Lake Ontario National Marine Sanctuary began on January 17, 2017, when leaders of the New York counties of Oswego, Jefferson, Cayuga, and Wayne and of the city of Oswego submitted a nomination to NOAA. The nomination was for a sanctuary protecting a 1,746-square-mile (1,318 sq nmi; 4,522 km^{2}) area of southeastern Lake Ontario which at the time included 21 known shipwrecks (including the wrecks of St. Peter and of the 19th-century cargo ship David W. Mills, the latter a New York State Submerged Cultural Preserve and Dive Site) and one aircraft wreck and was suspected of containing an additional 47 shipwrecks and two aircraft wrecks. The governor of New York, the Onandaga Nation, and several historical societies, museums, and recreation, conservation, tourism, and education groups endorsed the nomination.

NOAA published a notice of intent to initiate the designation process on April 19, 2019. In 2020, it established a 15-member pre-designation Sanctuary Advisory Council to help inform the designation process: Composed of a variety of community stakeholders, it met throughout the designation process, focusing on stakeholder participation and serving as a liaison between NOAA and the community.

NOAA published a draft environmental impact statement and draft management plan on July 7, 2021, proposing three alternatives:

- Create no sanctuary.
- Create a sanctuary encompassing an area of 1,786 square miles (1,349 sq nmi; 4,626 km^{2}) which included 1,742 square miles (1,315 sq nmi; 4,512 km^{2}) of southeastern Lake Ontario and 62 square miles (47 sq nmi; 161 km^{2}) in the Thousand Islands region of the St. Lawrence River, protecting 67 shipwrecks and one aircraft wreck that were known at the time. It would include waters off Oswego, Jefferson, Cayuga, Wayne, and St. Lawrence counties.
- Create a sanctuary including only the 1,742-square-mile (1,315 sq nmi; 4,512 km^{2}) area in southeastern Lake Ontario, protecting 43 shipwrecks and one aircraft wreck that were known at the time. It would include waters off Oswego, Jefferson, Cayuga, and Wayne counties.
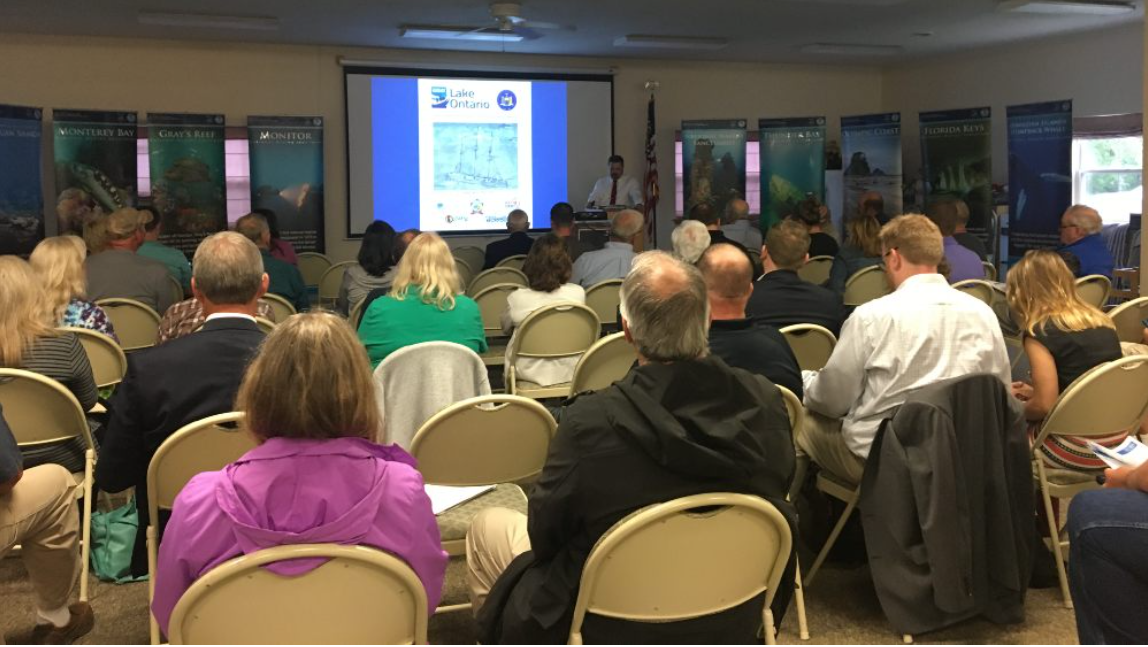
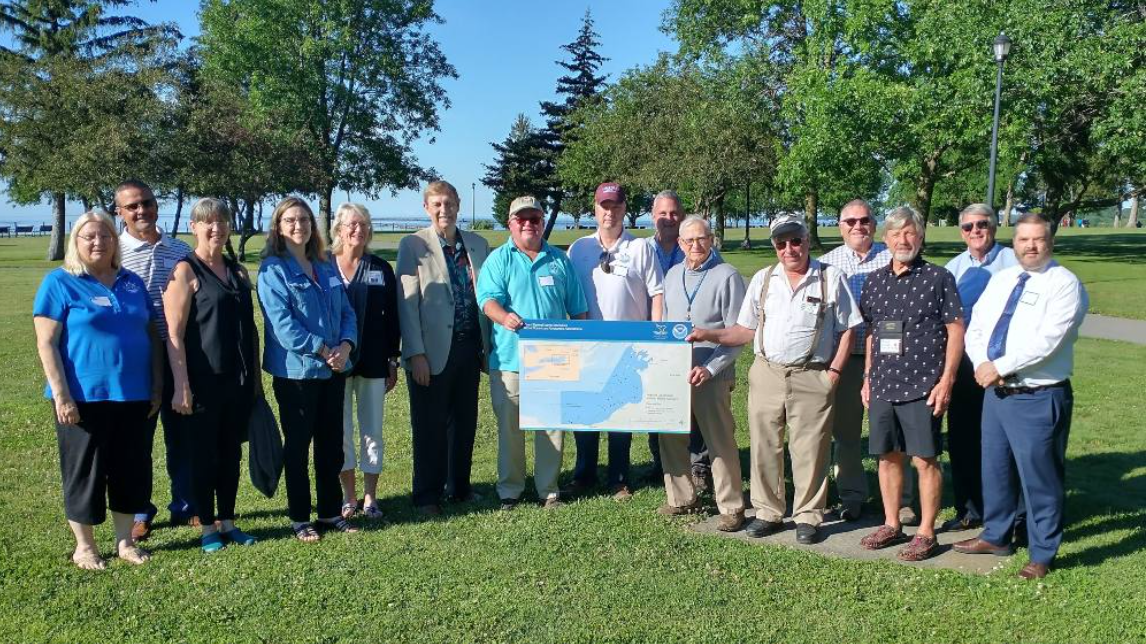
TOP: A public meeting about the proposed sanctuary in Fair Haven, New York, on June 10, 2019. ABOVE: The Sanctuary Advisory Council poses with a map of the new sanctuary.

NOAA received 65 written comments, most of them in support of the designation of the proposed sanctuary. However, the commercial shipping community and several United States Government agencies expressed safety concerns about including a portion of the St. Lawrence River in the proposed sanctuary.

In October 2022, the NOAA survey ship NOAAS Thomas Jefferson (S 222) conducted a hydrographic survey of 274 square nautical miles (363 sq mi; 940 km^{2}) of Lake Ontario proposed for inclusion in the sanctuary. The survey, which had a particular focus on locating the wreck of Washington, lasted seven days and included the deepest point in Lake Ontario at a depth of 244 metres (801 ft).

NOAA published a notice of proposed rulemaking on January 19, 2023, with sanctuary boundaries which excluded the waters of the St. Lawrence River. A period for public input on the proposed rulemaking followed and concluded on March 23, 2023. NOAA received 95 written comments, most of them again in support of the proposed sanctuary. Based on public comments on the draft environmental impact statement, draft management plan, and proposed regulations, and after consultation with representatives of U.S. Government and New York state government agencies and indigenous nations and tribes, NOAA developed the final environmental impact statement, final management plan, and final rule. It published the final environmental impact statement on April 19, 2024.

On June 5, 2024, NOAA announced that it would designate the sanctuary, and it published the final rulemaking on June 6, 2024. After a mandatory wait for 45 days of continuous session of the United States Congress, beginning on the date the final rule was published, NOAA designated the sanctuary on September 6, 2024.

== Exploration ==
In April 2026, NOAAS Thomas Jefferson entered the St. Lawrence Seaway bound for her first deployment to the Great Lakes since 2022. Plans called for her to spend the summer of 2026 mapping the waters of western and central Lake Erie and eastern Lake Ontario to improve navigation safety and conducting surveys within the Lake Ontario National Marine Sanctuary to identify critical habitats. Her operations are to include the use of a DriX uncrewed surface vehicle to accelerate her mapping work in Lake Ontario off Oswego, New York.

== Tourism and recreation ==
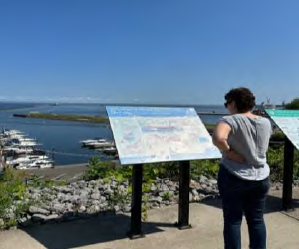
A visitor reads a maritime history sign in Oswego, New York.

The Lake Ontario National Marine Sanctuary's waters are popular for scuba diving, recreational fishing, recreational boating, and paddling. Several lighthouses and maritime museums and many New York state parks are located along the coastline it protects. In addition to their historical value, the sanctuary's shipwrecks, aircraft wreck, and other submerged archaeological sites offer recreational diving opportunities.

== Administration ==
The Office of National Marine Sanctuaries, an element of NOAA, administers the Lake Ontario National Marine Sanctuary jointly with the Government of New York. Upon designation of the sanctuary, NOAA took steps to create a new 15-member Sanctuary Advisory Council to inform the governance of the sanctuary.

To protect shipwrecks and other features of historical and archaeological interest, NOAA regulates activities within the sanctuary. Moving, damaging, possessing, or selling sanctuary resources and anchoring on shipwrecks are prohibited, and a permit is required to operate tethered underwater mobile systems (such as remotely operated underwater vehicles) in sanctuary waters. The regulations are tailored to allow important economic activities in the sanctuary, such as commercial shipping.
