= Lake Ontario =

Easternmost of Great Lakes in North America

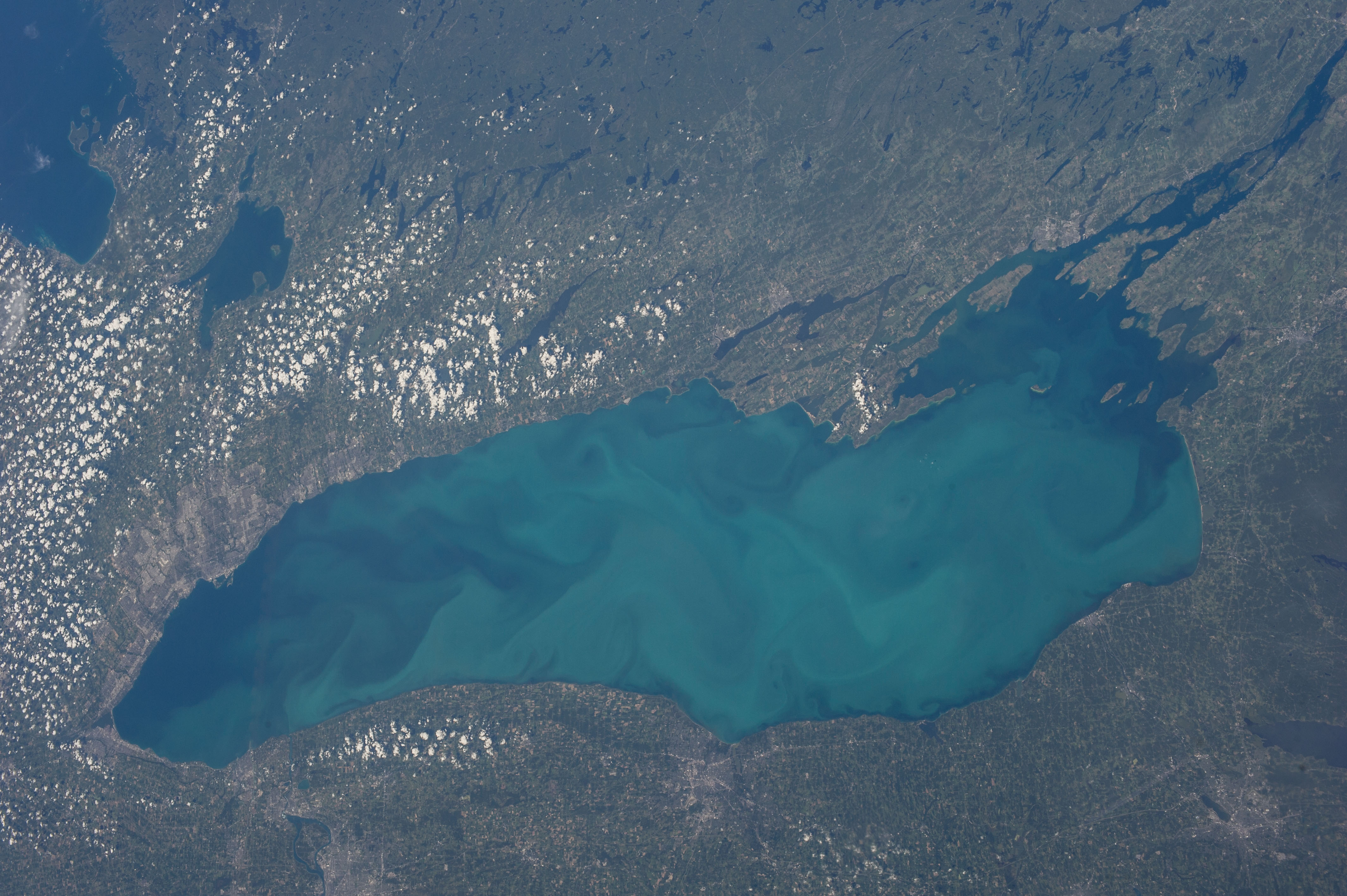
- Lake Ontario seen from the International Space Station on August 24, 2013. The cloudy substance is algal bloom.

- Location within North America

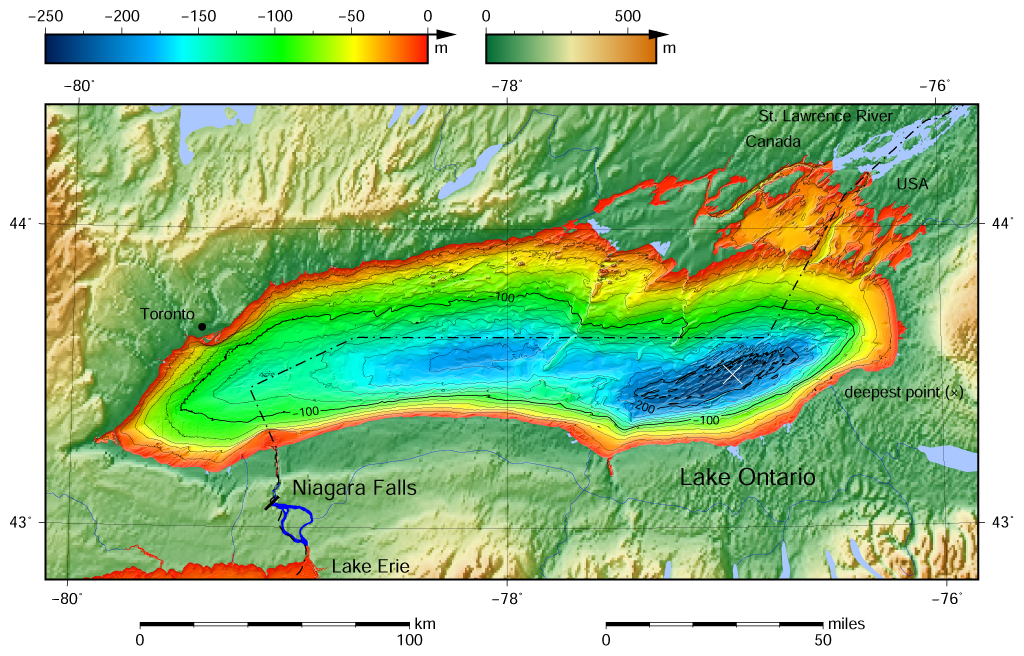
- Lake Ontario bathymetric map. The deepest point is marked with "×".
- Location: North America
- Group: Great Lakes
- Coordinates: 43.7°N 77.9°W
- Lake type: Glacial
- Etymology: Ontarí:io, a Wyandot (Huron) word meaning "great lake"
- Primary inflows: Niagara River
- Primary outflows: St. Lawrence River
- Catchment area: 64,020 km^{2} (24,720 sq mi)
- Basin countries: Canada; United States
- Max. length: 311 km (193 mi)
- Max. width: 85 km (53 mi)
- Surface area: 19,000 km^{2} (7,340 sq mi) (total); 10,000 km^{2} (3,980 mi^{2}) (Canadian side); 9,000 km^{2} (3,560 mi^{2}) (American side)
- Average depth: 86 m (283 ft)
- Max. depth: 244 m (802 ft)
- Water volume: 1,631 km^{3} (391.4 cu mi)
- Residence time: 6 years
- Shore length^{1}: 1,020 km (634 mi) plus 126 km (78 mi) for islands
- Surface elevation: 74 m (243 ft)
- Settlements: Toronto, Ontario; Mississauga, Ontario; Hamilton, Ontario; Rochester, New York
- ^{1} Shore length is not a well-defined measure.

Lake Ontario (French: lac Ontario) is one of the five Great Lakes of North America. It is bounded on the north, west, and southwest by the Canadian province of Ontario, and on the south and east by the U.S. state of New York. The Canada–United States border spans the centre of the lake. On the Canadian side, the major cities are Kingston, Mississauga, Toronto, Hamilton, and St. Catharines. On the American side, the major cities are Rochester and Watertown.

As the last in the Great Lakes chain of freshwater lakes, Lake Ontario serves as the outlet to the Atlantic Ocean via the St. Lawrence River, comprising the western end of the St. Lawrence Seaway. Its primary inlet is the Niagara River from Lake Erie. The Long Sault control dam, primarily along with the Moses-Saunders Power Dam regulates the water level of the lake.

== Name ==
The French explorer Samuel de Champlain named the lake "Lac S. Louis" (in English: Lake Saint Louis) in 1632, a name that remained in use until the end of the 17th century.

The name Ontario is likely derived from the Iroquoian word Kaniatarí:io or Oniatarí:io meaning "lake of shining waters" or "beautiful lake". It has been in use since at least 1641. During French colonial Canada, various other names for the lake were also used, including Frontenac and St. Louis, though Ontario ultimately became the common term.

Amidst an ongoing trade war with Canada, United States president Donald Trump signed an executive order in August 2026 directing U.S. federal agencies to refer to the lake as Lake America. The name was rejected by Canadian officials and numerous U.S. state officials, but was adopted by a number of mapping services offered by private companies, including Apple Maps and Google Maps, when serving their U.S. users.

== Geography ==
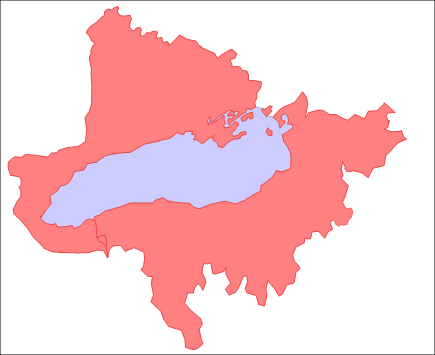
Lake Ontario's drainage basin

Lake Ontario is the easternmost of the Great Lakes and the smallest in surface area (19,000 square kilometres [7,340 mi^{2}]), of which about 10,000 square kilometres (3,980 mi^{2}) is in Canada and 9,000 square kilometres (3,560 mi^{2}) in the United States. Lake Ontario exceeds Lake Erie in volume (1,640 km^{3} [393 mi^{3}] to 480 km^{3} [116 cu mi]). It is the 13th-largest lake in the world. When its islands are included, the lake's shoreline is about 1,146 kilometres (712 mi) long. As the last lake in the Great Lakes' hydrologic chain, Lake Ontario has the lowest mean surface elevation of the lakes at 74 metres (243 ft) above sea level; 99 metres (326 ft) lower than its neighbour upstream. Its maximum length is 311 kilometres; 168 nautical miles (193 statute miles), and its maximum width is 85 kilometres; 46 nautical miles (53 mi). The lake's average depth is 47 fathoms 1 foot (86 metres [283 ft]), with a maximum depth of 133 fathoms 4 feet (244 metres [802 ft]) in the Rochester Basin.

The lake's primary source is the Niagara River, draining Lake Erie, with the Saint Lawrence River serving as the outlet. The drainage basin covers 64,030 square kilometres (24,720 mi^{2}). As with all the Great Lakes, water levels change both within the year (owing to seasonal changes in water input) and among years (owing to longer-term trends in precipitation). These water level fluctuations are an integral part of lake ecology and help create and maintain extensive wetlands. The lake also has an important freshwater fishery, although it has been negatively affected by factors including overfishing, water pollution and invasive species.

Baymouth bars built by prevailing winds and currents have created a significant number of lagoons and sheltered harbours, mostly near (but not limited to) Prince Edward County, Ontario, and the easternmost shores. Perhaps the best-known example is Toronto Bay, chosen as the site of the Upper Canada capital for its strategic harbour. Other prominent examples include Hamilton Harbour, Irondequoit Bay, Presqu'ile Bay, and Sodus Bay. The bars themselves are the sites of long beaches, such as Sandbanks Provincial Park and Sandy Island Beach State Park. These sand bars are often associated with large wetlands, which support large numbers of plant and animal species, as well as providing important rest areas for migratory birds. Presqu'ile, on the north shore of Lake Ontario, is particularly significant in this regard. One unique feature of the lake is the Z-shaped Bay of Quinte which separates Prince Edward County from the Ontario mainland, save for a 3.2-kilometre (2 mi) isthmus near Trenton; this feature also supports many wetlands and aquatic plants, as well as associated fisheries.

Major rivers draining into Lake Ontario include the Niagara River, Don River, Humber River, Rouge River, Trent River, Cataraqui River, Genesee River, Oswego River, Black River, Little Salmon River, Credit River, Ganaraska River and the Salmon River.

On the Canadian side, the Welland Canal connects Lakes Ontario and Erie and is used for maritime navigation between the two lakes.

== Geology ==
The lake basin was carved out of soft, weak Silurian-age rocks by the Wisconsin ice sheet during the last ice age. The action of the ice occurred along the pre-glacial Ontarian River valley, which had approximately the same orientation as today's basin. Material that was pushed southward by the ice sheet left landforms such as drumlins, kames, and moraines, both on the modern land surface and the lake bottom, reorganizing the region's entire drainage system. As the ice sheet retreated toward the north, it still dammed the St. Lawrence Valley outlet, so the lake surface was at a higher level. This stage is known as Lake Iroquois. During that time, the lake drained through present-day Syracuse, New York, into the Mohawk River, thence to the Hudson River and the Atlantic. The shoreline created during this stage can be easily recognized by the (now dry) beaches and wave-cut hills 16 to 40 kilometres (10 to 25 mi) from the present shoreline.

When the ice finally receded from the St. Lawrence valley, the outlet was below sea level, and for a short time, the lake became a bay of the Atlantic Ocean, in association with the Champlain Sea. Gradually the land rebounded from the release of the weight of about 2,000 metres (6,500 ft) of ice that had been stacked on it. It is still rebounding about 30 centimetres (12 in) per century in the St. Lawrence area. Since the ice receded from the area last, the most rapid rebound still occurs there. This means the lake bed is gradually tilting southward, inundating the south shore and turning river valleys into bays. Both north and south shores experience shoreline erosion, but the tilting amplifies this effect on the south shore, causing loss to property owners.

Map of Great Lakes (Lake Ontario in darker blue)

== Climate ==
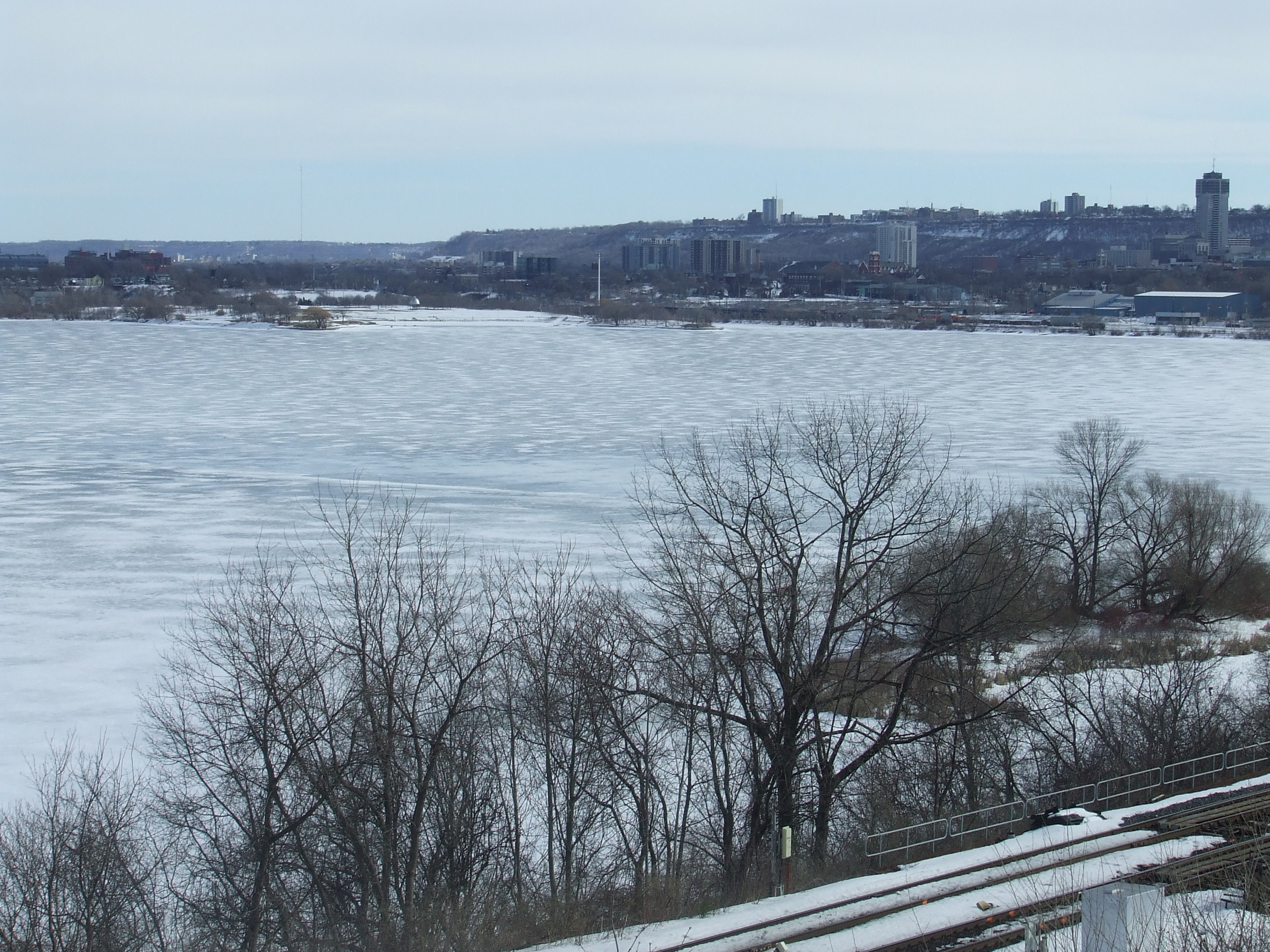
Hamilton Harbour frozen over. Ice sheets can form along the shoreline of Lake Ontario during the winter.

The lake has a natural seiche rhythm of eleven minutes. The seiche effect normally is only about 1.9 centimetres (3/4 in) but can be greatly amplified by earth movement, winds, and atmospheric pressure changes. Because of its great depth, the lake as a whole does not completely freeze in winter, but an ice sheet covering between 10% and 90% of the lake area typically develops, depending on the severity of the winter. Ice sheets typically form along the shoreline and in slack water bays, where the lake is not as deep. During the winters of 1877 and 1878, the ice sheet coverage was up to 95–100% of the lake. During the War of 1812, the ice cover was stable enough the American naval commander stationed at Sackets Harbor feared a British attack from Kingston, over the ice. The lake has completely frozen over on five recorded occasions: in 1830, 1874, 1893, 1912, and 1934.

When the cold winds of winter pass over the warmer water of the lake, they pick up moisture and drop it as lake-effect snow. Since the prevailing winter winds are from the northwest, the southern and southeastern shoreline of the lake is referred to as the snowbelt. In some winters, the area between Oswego and Pulaski may receive twenty or more feet (600 cm) of snowfall. Also impacted by lake-effect snow is the Tug Hill Plateau, an area of elevated land about 32 kilometres (20 mi) east of Lake Ontario. The "Hill", as it is often referred to, typically receives more snow than any other region in the eastern United States. As a result, Tug Hill is a popular location for winter enthusiasts, such as snow-mobilers and cross-country skiers. Lake-effect snow often extends inland as far as Syracuse, with that city often recording the most winter snowfall accumulation of any large city in the United States. Other cities in the world receive more snow annually, such as Quebec City, which averages 340 centimetres (135 in), and Sapporo, Japan, which receives 480 centimetres (189 in) each year and is often regarded as the snowiest city in the world.

Foggy conditions (particularly in fall) can be created by thermal contrasts and can be an impediment for recreational boaters. Lake breezes in spring tend to slow fruit bloom until the frost danger is past, and in the autumn delay the onset of fall frost, particularly on the south shore. Cool onshore winds also slow the early bloom of plants and flowers until later in the spring season, protecting them from possible frost damage. Such microclimatic effects have enabled tender fruit production in a continental climate, with the southwest shore supporting a major fruit-growing area. Apples, cherries, pears, plums, and peaches are grown in many commercial orchards around Rochester. Between Stoney Creek and Niagara-on-the-Lake on the Niagara Peninsula is a major fruit-growing and wine-making area. The wine-growing region extends over the international border into Niagara and Orleans counties in New York. Apple varieties that tolerate a more extreme climate are grown on the lake's north shore, around Cobourg.

== Ecology ==
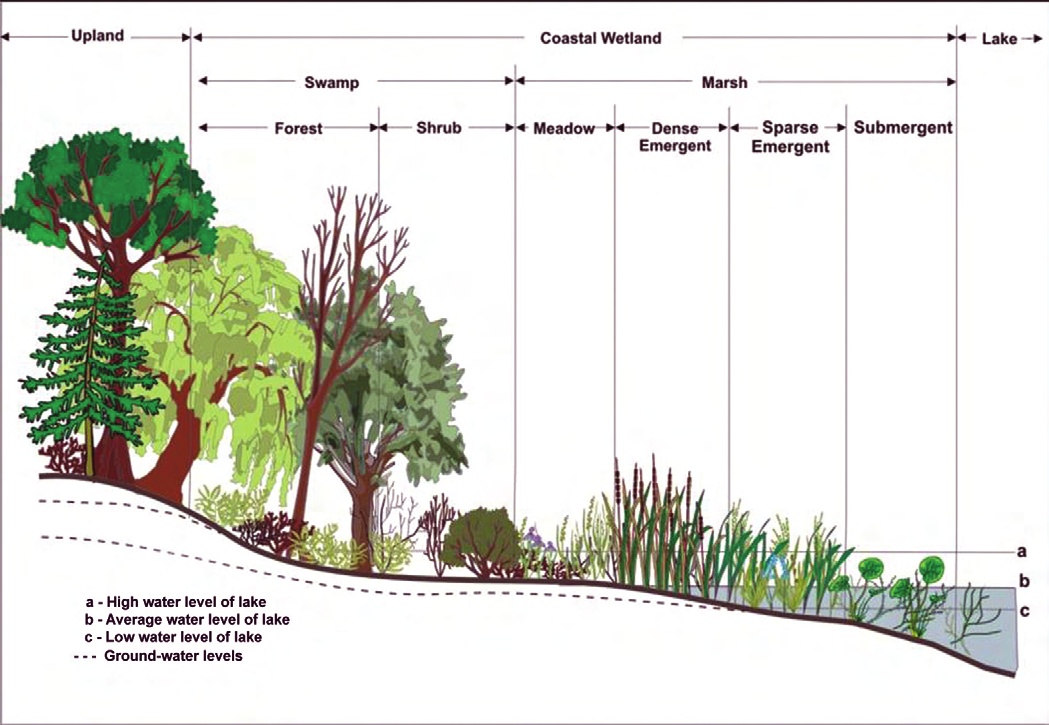
Profile of coastal wetlands for Lake Ontario

The Great Lakes watershed is a region of high biodiversity, and Lake Ontario is important for its diversity of birds, fish, reptiles, amphibians, and plants. Many of these special species are associated with shorelines, particularly sand dunes, lagoons, and wetlands. The importance of wetlands to the lake has been appreciated, and many of the larger wetlands have protected status. These wetlands are changing, partly because the natural water level fluctuations have been reduced. Many wetland plants are dependent upon low water levels to reproduce. When water levels are stabilized, the area and diversity of the marsh is reduced. This is particularly true of meadow marsh (also known as wet meadow wetlands); for example, in Eel Bay near Alexandria Bay, regulation of lake levels has resulted in large losses of wet meadow. Often this is accompanied by the invasion of cattails, which displace many of the native plant species and reduce plant diversity. Eutrophication may accelerate this process by providing nitrogen and phosphorus for the more rapid growth of competitively dominant plants. Similar effects are occurring on the north shore, in wetlands such as Presqu'ile, which have interdunal wetlands called pannes, with high plant diversity and many unusual plant species.

Lake Ontario's food web

Most of the forests around the lake are deciduous forests dominated by trees including maple, oak, beech, ash and basswood. These are classified as part of the Mixedwood Plains Ecozone by Environment and Climate Change Canada, or as the Eastern Great Lakes and Hudson Lowlands by the United States Environmental Protection Agency, or as the Great Lakes Ecoregion by The Nature Conservancy. Deforestation in the vicinity of the lake has had many negative impacts, including loss of forest birds, extinction of native salmon, and increased amounts of sediment flowing into the lake. In some areas, more than 90 per cent of the forest cover has been removed and replaced by agriculture. Certain tree species, such as hemlock, have also been particularly depleted by past logging activity. Guidelines for restoration stress the importance of maintaining and restoring forest cover, particularly along streams and wetlands.

By the 1960s and 1970s, the increased pollution caused frequent algal blooms to occur in the summer. These blooms killed large numbers of fish, and left decomposing piles of filamentous algae and dead fish along the shores.

=== Water pollution ===
Lake Ontario is the most downstream lake of the Great Lakes, so the pollution from all the other lakes flows into it. Lake Ontario was ranked as the most environmentally stressed amongst the five Great Lakes in a 2015 ecological study. Some of the stresses on the lake include excess application of fertilizers in agriculture running into the lake, spillover from obsolete municipal sewage systems, toxic chemicals from industries along the rivers that drain into the lake, and metropolitan drainage from big cities like Toronto, Rochester, and Hamilton.

Randle Reef, the westernmost part of Lake Ontario, has been identified as one of the most contaminated areas on Lake Ontario alongside other areas of concern on Great Lakes. However, a $150-million clean-up project had begun in 2016 and is expected to be completed by 2025.

== Human history ==
The first archaeological evidence of humans in the Lake Ontario region dates to circa 11,000 BP. These peoples were mobile foragers who based much of their movement and settlement on the seasonal migrations of caribou, but who also used smaller animals and plant resources. These early settlers likely inhabited the lake margins, but those early lake shores are now either far from the current lake representing earlier, higher waters, or submerged under the modern lake, representing periods of lower lake levels. Lake Ontario reached its modern level circa 4000 BP. The lake was a border between the Wendat people and the Haudenosaunee Confederacy (Iroquois) in the pre-Columbian era. In the 17th century, the Haudenosaunee committed genocide against the Wendat in southern Ontario and settled the northern shores of Lake Ontario. When the Haudenosaunee withdrew and the Anishinaabe moved in from the north to southern Ontario, they retained the Iroquoian name.

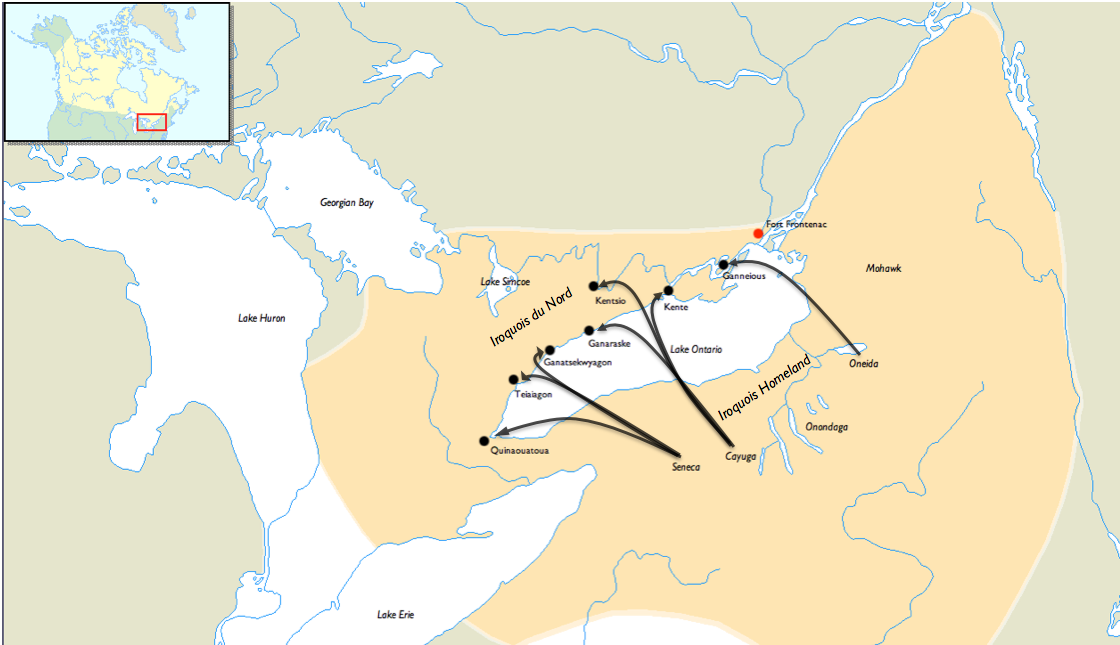
A map depicting the Haudenosaunee settlement of the north shore of Lake Ontario during the late-17th century

It is believed the first European to reach the lake was Étienne Brûlé in 1615. European colonization of Lake Ontario was slow and uneven due to the power and organization of the Haudenosaunee, Wendat, and Ojibwe nations. From 1688 to 1694, the Haudenosaunee largely excluded the French from Lake Ontario.

As was their practice, the French explorers introduced other names for the lake. In 1632 and 1656, the lake was referred to as Lac de St. Louis or Lake St. Louis by Samuel de Champlain and cartographer Nicolas Sanson, respectively. In 1660, Jesuit historian Francis Creuxius coined the name Lacus Ontarius. In a map drawn in the Relation des Jésuites (1662–1663), the lake bears the legend "Lac Ontario ou des Iroquois" with the name "Ondiara" in smaller type. A French map produced in 1712 (currently in the Canadian Museum of History), created by military engineer Jean-Baptiste de Couagne, identified Lake Ontario as "Lac Frontenac" named after Louis de Buade, Comte de Frontenac et de Palluau. He was a French soldier, courtier, and Governor General of New France from 1672 to 1682 and from 1689 to his death in 1698.

In the 17th century, sightings of an alleged creature named Gaasyendietha, similar to the so-called Loch Ness Monster, were reported in the lake. The creature is described as large with a long neck, green in colour, and generally causes a break in the surface waves.

A series of trading posts were established by both the British and French, such as Fort Frontenac in 1673, Fort Oswego in 1722, and Fort Rouillé in 1750. As the easternmost and nearest lake to the Atlantic seaboard of Canada and the United States, population centres here are among the oldest in the Great Lakes basin, with Kingston, Ontario, formerly the capital of Canada, dating to the establishment of Fort Frontenac in 1673.

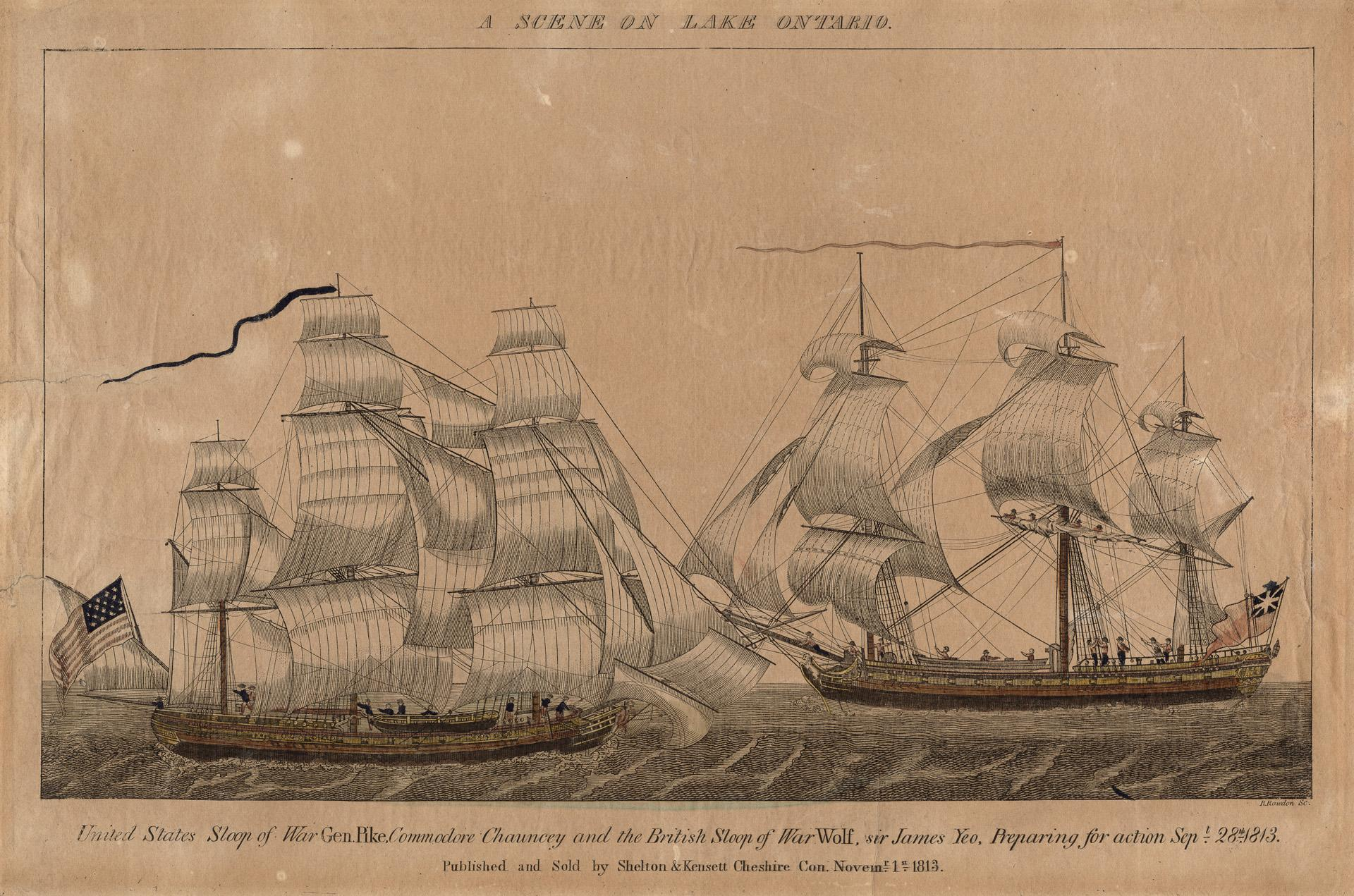
USS General Pike and HMS Wolfe prepare for action on September 28, 1813. The battle was one of several engagements that took place on Lake Ontario during the War of 1812.

After the French and Indian War, all forts around the lake were under British control. During the American Revolution, the British controlled Lake Ontario from their bases at Carleton Island, Navy Hall, and Oswego, allowing them to largely exclude the Americans from the lake. The United States took possession of the forts along the American side of the lake at the signing of the Jay Treaty in 1794. Permanent, non-military European settlement began during the American Revolution with the influx of Loyalist settlers.

Following the American Revolution, sailing commerce slowly returned to Lake Ontario. There was one private commercial vessel, the Good Intent, on the lake in 1788. Several more vessels were launched prior to 1800, primarily by Canadian merchants. Commerce continued to expand until the Embargo of 1807. There was significant smuggling across Lake Ontario during the embargo.

During the War of 1812, the Royal Navy and U.S. Navy operated substantial shipyards at Kingston, Ontario, and Sackets Harbor, New York, respectively, and fought in several engagements for control of Lake Ontario. The Great Lakes, including Lake Ontario, were largely demilitarized after the Rush–Bagot Treaty was ratified in 1818. As a result, most of the naval vessels were sold or abandoned.

The lake became a hub of commercial activity following the War of 1812 with canal building on both sides of the border and significant sailing and steamer commerce.

Sailing commerce on Lake Ontario was initially significant but declined relative to the other Great Lakes after the mid-19th century as the centres of colonialist agriculture, timbering, and mining moved farther west. After the Erie Canal opened, much of the movement of people and commodities between the East Coast and the Great Lakes circumvented Lake Ontario. Oswego remained an important port on Lake Ontario during this time because the Oswego Canal allowed shippers to connect to the Erie Canal while avoiding bottlenecks at Buffalo, New York. Kingston, Clayton, and Oswego were major 19th century wooden shipbuilding centres on Lake Ontario. Oil and coal were important commodities shipped on Lake Ontario through the early 20th century. In the late 19th and early 20th centuries, a type of scow known as a stone hooker was in operation on the northwest shore, particularly around Port Credit and Bronte. Stonehooking was the practice of raking flat fragments of Dundas shale from the shallow lake floor of the area for use in construction, particularly in the growing city of Toronto.

The Frontenac was the first steamer on Lake Ontario and the Great Lakes. This ship was launched in September 1816 from Finkle's Point (now Bath) near Kingston, ON. Frontenac was constructed by two shipbuilders who had worked for the Americans during the War of 1812 and was captained by a former Royal Navy sailing master. The Americans at Sackets Harbor launched a smaller steamship, the Ontario, in March 1817.

As bulk cargoes became increasingly important in Great Lakes commerce and the number of improved harbours increased, so did propeller ships. The number of propeller ships exceeded the number of side-wheel steamers by circa 1857. The Vandalia was the first propeller ship on the Great Lakes and the second in the United States. Launched at Oswego in 1841, Vandalia's propeller was designed by John Ericsson. Steamer activity peaked in the mid-19th century before competition from railway lines.

Iron hull construction developed on Lake Ontario during the mid-19th century but did not become widespread until the early 20th century. The first iron-hulled ship on the Great Lakes, the British paddle-wheel gunboat HMS Mohawk, was launched at Kingston in 1843. The Passport and the Magnet, both built for the Royal Mail Line, were launched at Kingston in 1846 and at Niagara in 1847, respectively.

=== Swims across the lake ===
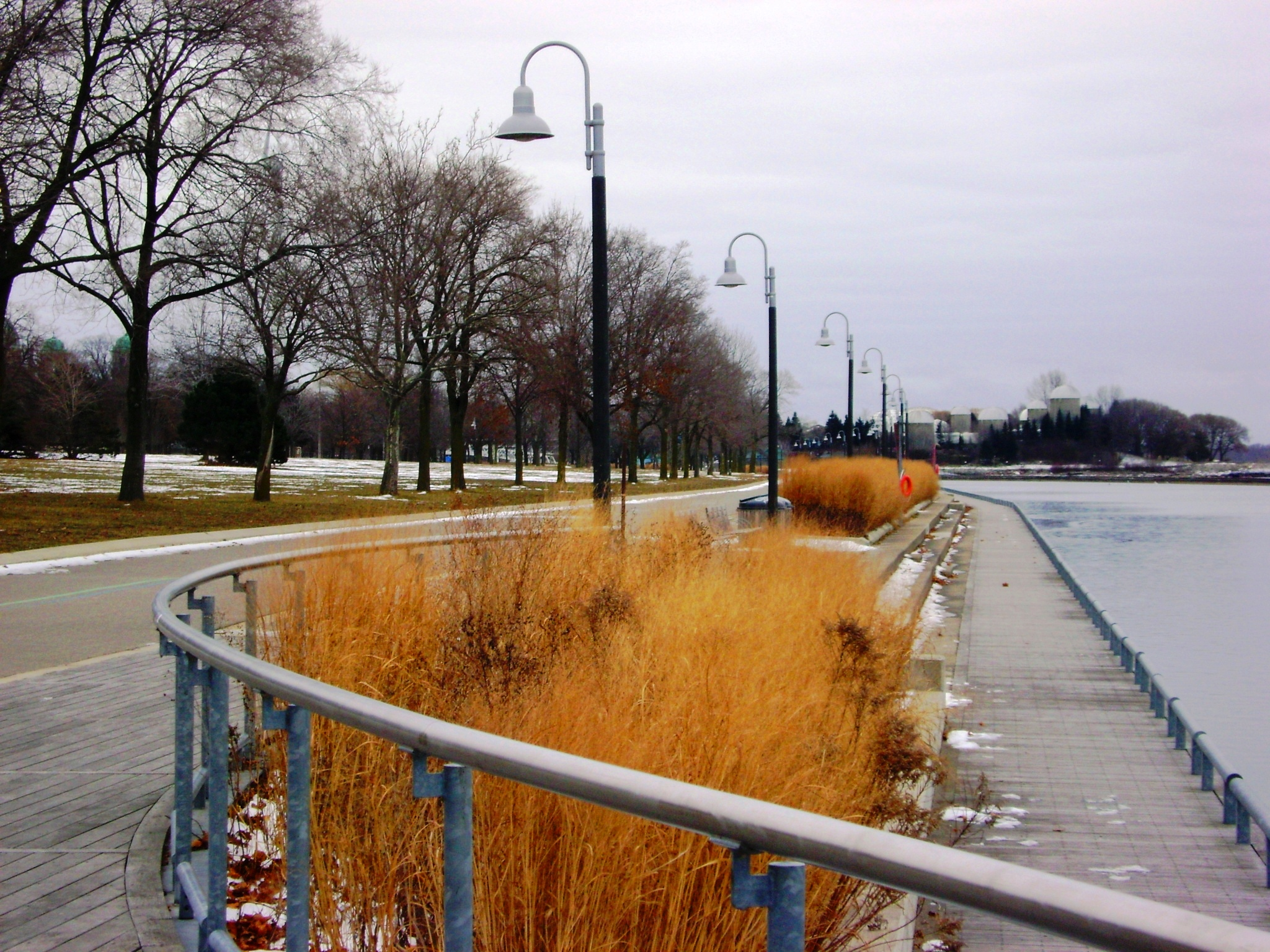
Marilyn Bell Park in Toronto

As of 2026, more than 60 people have successfully swum across the lake. The first person who accomplished the feat was a Canadian long-distance swimmer Marilyn Bell, who did it in 1954 at age 16. Toronto's Marilyn Bell Park is named in her honour. The park opened in 1984 and is east of the spot where Bell completed her swim. In 1974, Diana Nyad became the first person who swam across the lake against the current (from north to south). On August 28, 2007, 14-year-old Natalie Lambert from Kingston, Ontario, made the swim, leaving Sackets Harbor, New York, and reaching Kingston's Confederation basin less than 24 hours after she entered the lake. On August 19, 2012, 14-year-old Annaleise Carr became the youngest person to swim across the lake. She completed the 52-kilometre (32 mi) crossing from Niagara-on-the-Lake to Marilyn Bell Park in just under 27 hours.

== Settlements ==
A large conurbation called the Golden Horseshoe occupies the lake's westernmost shores, anchored by the cities of Toronto and Hamilton. Ports on the Canadian side include St. Catharines, Oshawa, Cobourg and Kingston, near the St. Lawrence River outlet. Close to 9 million people, or over a quarter of Canada's population, live within the watershed of Lake Ontario. The American shore is largely rural, with the exception of Rochester and the much smaller ports at Oswego and Sackets Harbor. The city of Syracuse is 64 kilometres (40 mi) inland, connected to the lake by the New York State Canal System. Over 2 million people live in Lake Ontario's American watershed.

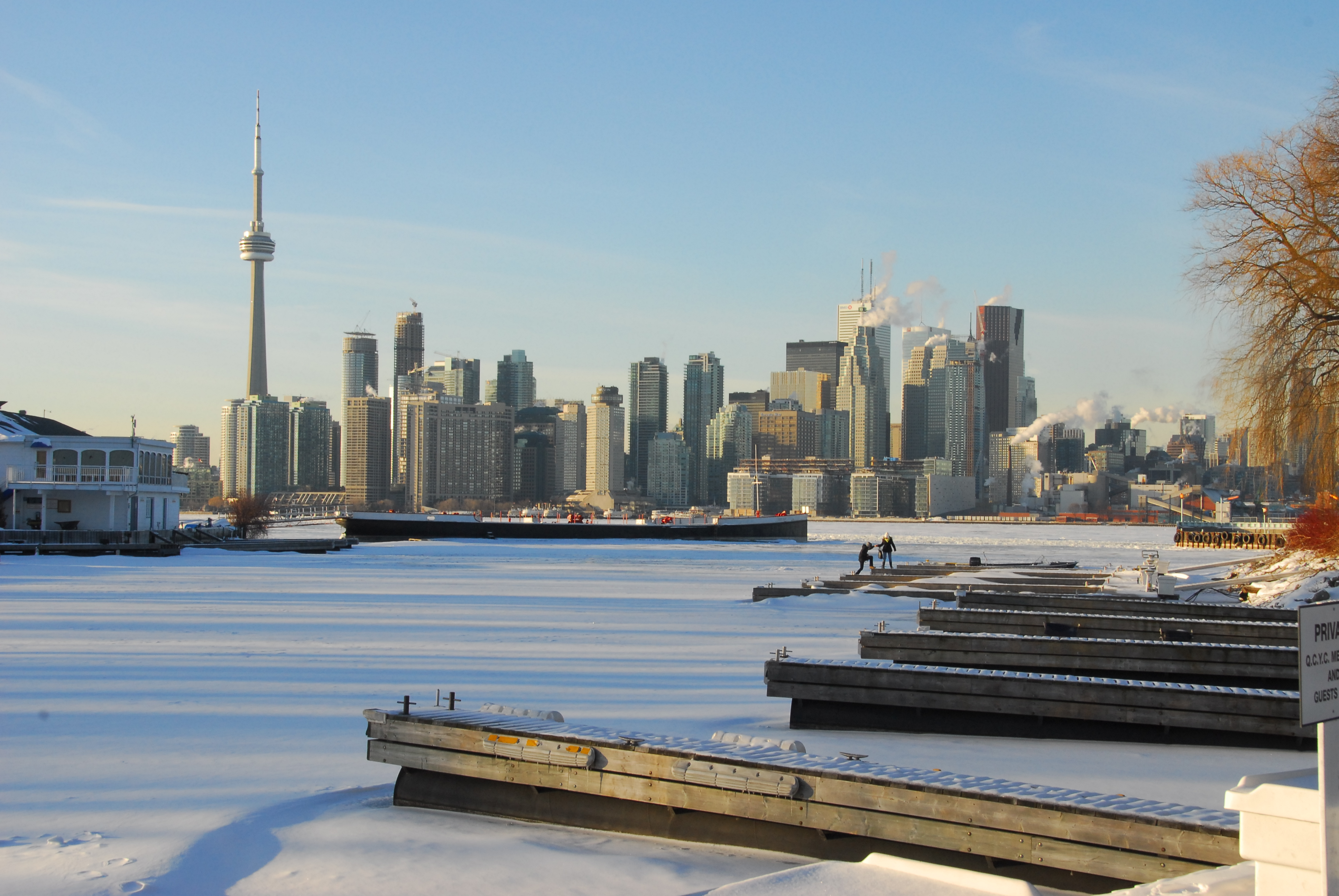
View of Toronto and a frozen Lake Ontario from the Toronto Islands. Toronto is the largest settlement located along the lake's shoreline.

Ontario, Canada

- Toronto
- Mississauga
- Hamilton
- Burlington
- Oshawa
- Kingston
- Whitby
- Stoney Creek
- Grimsby
- Oakville
- St. Catharines
- Port Hope
- Cobourg
- Brighton
- Pickering
- Ajax
- Bowmanville
- Belleville
- Trenton
- Niagara-on-the-Lake

New York, United States

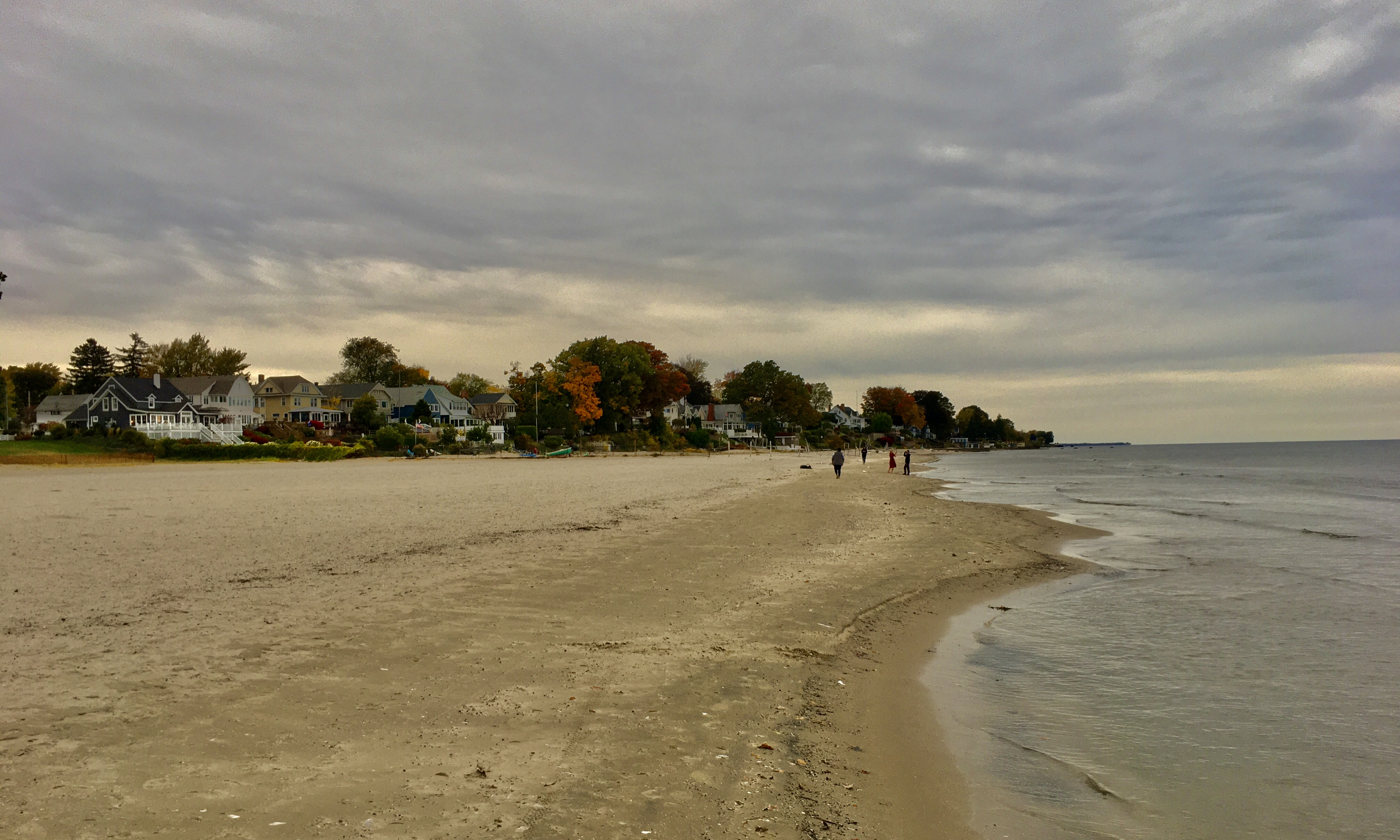
Lake Ontario's beachfront in Rochester, New York. The city is the largest settlement in New York that is located along the lake's shoreline.

- Rochester
- Greece
- Irondequoit
- Webster
- Oswego
- Fair Haven
- Sackets Harbor
- Cape Vincent
- Three Mile Bay
- Wilson
- Chaumont
- Olcott
- Sodus Point

== Islands ==
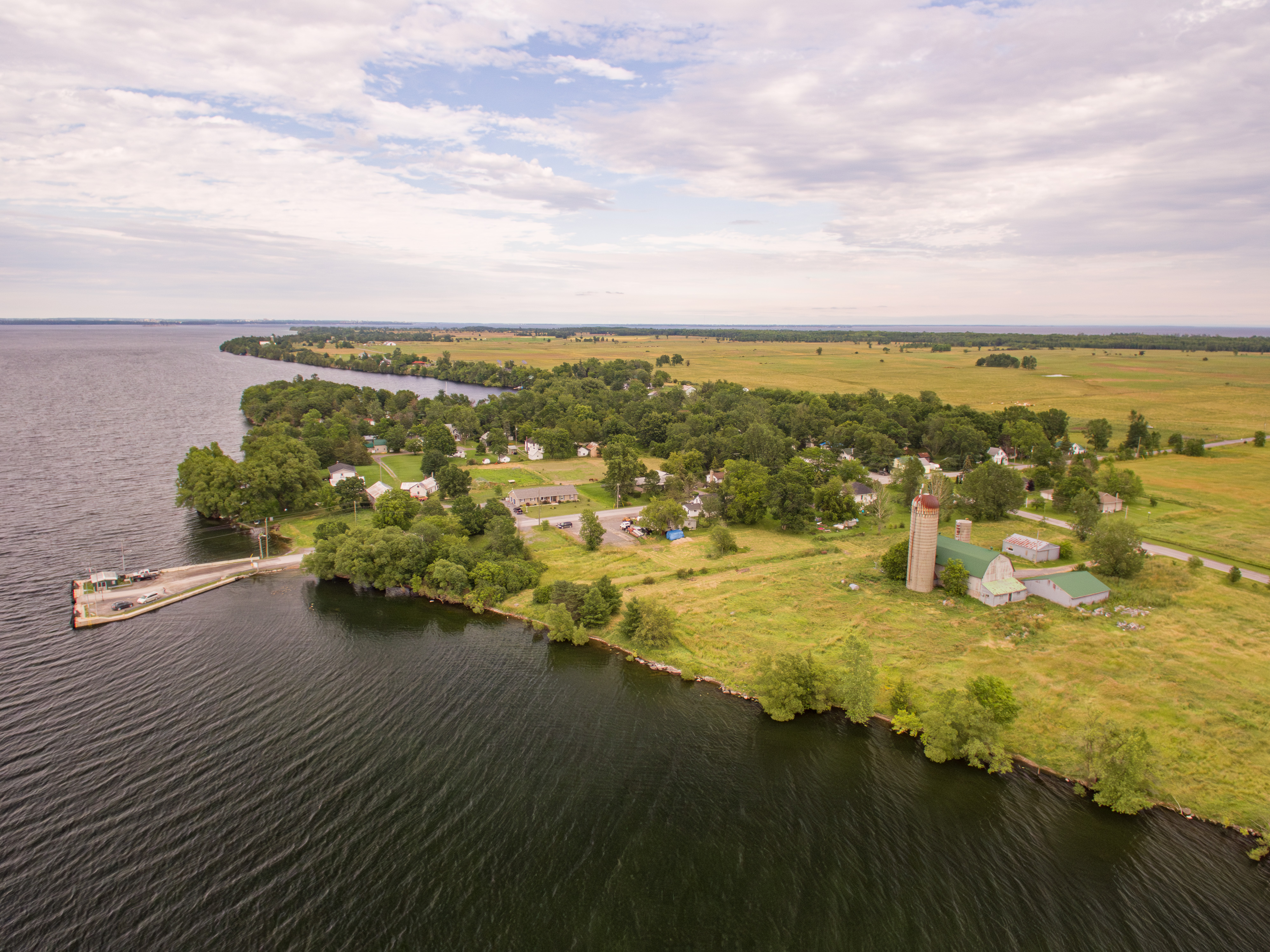
View of Stella Village on Amherst Island, one of several islands located in the lake

Several islands exist in the lake, the largest of which is Wolfe Island. Nearly all of Lake Ontario's islands are on the eastern and northeastern shores, between the Prince Edward County headland and the lake's outlet at Kingston, underlain by the basement rock found throughout the region. However, there exist several islands in the northwestern portion of the lake. Notable islands include:

- Amherst Island
- Association Island
- Big Island
- Galloo Island
- Garden Island
- Grenadier Island
- Howe Island
- Little Galloo Island
- Nicholson Island
- Simcoe Island
- Toronto Islands (an island chain of 15 smaller islands)
- Waupoos Island
- Wolfe Island

== Navigation ==
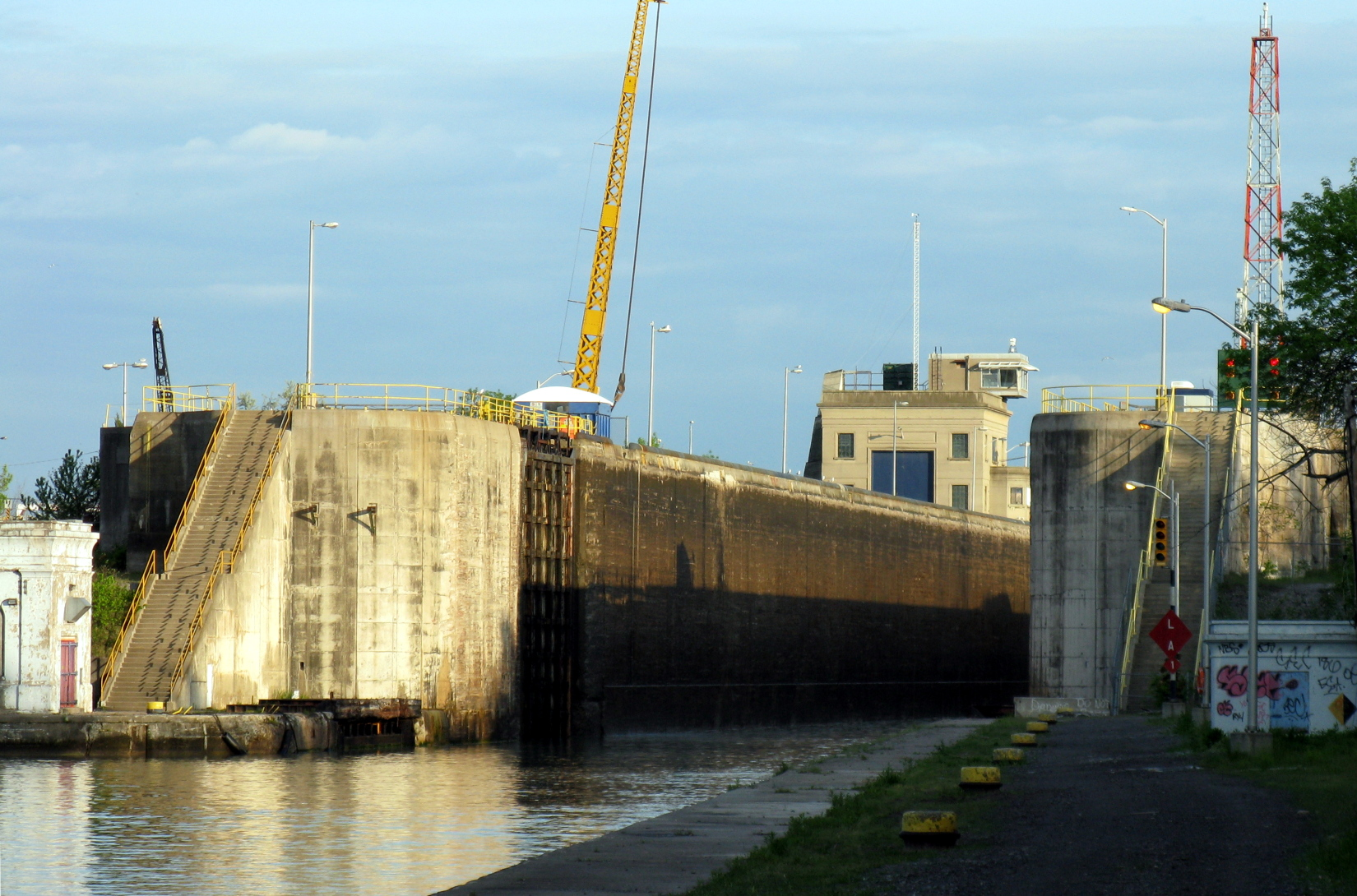
Canal Lock 1 at the Welland Canal in Lake Ontario. The canal forms a part of the Great Lakes Waterway, which connects Lake Ontario with the St. Lawrence River and other Great Lakes.

The Great Lakes Waterway connects the lake sidestream to the Atlantic Ocean via the Saint Lawrence Seaway and upstream to the other rivers in the chain via the Welland Canal and to Lake Erie. The Trent-Severn Waterway for pleasure boats connects Lake Ontario at the Bay of Quinte to Georgian Bay (Lake Huron) via Lake Simcoe. The Oswego Canal connects the lake at Oswego to the New York State Canal System, with outlets to the Hudson River, Lake Erie, and Lake Champlain. The Rideau Canal, also for pleasure boats, connects Lake Ontario at Kingston to the Ottawa River in downtown Ottawa, Ontario.

Several lighthouses exist throughout the lake to help with navigation. Notable historic examples include:

- Braddock Point Light
- Charlotte-Genesee Lighthouse
- Gibraltar Point Lighthouse
- Oswego Harbor West Pierhead Light
- Presqu'ile Lighthouse
- Selkirk Lighthouse
- Sodus Point Light
- Stony Point Light
- Thirty Mile Point Light

A land-based trail that roughly follows the lake's shoreline also exists, the Great Lakes Circle Tour and Seaway Trail. The designated scenic road systems connects all of the Great Lakes and the St. Lawrence River. As the Seaway Trail is posted on the U.S. side only, Lake Ontario is the only of the five Great Lakes to have no posted bi-national circle tour.

== National marine sanctuary ==
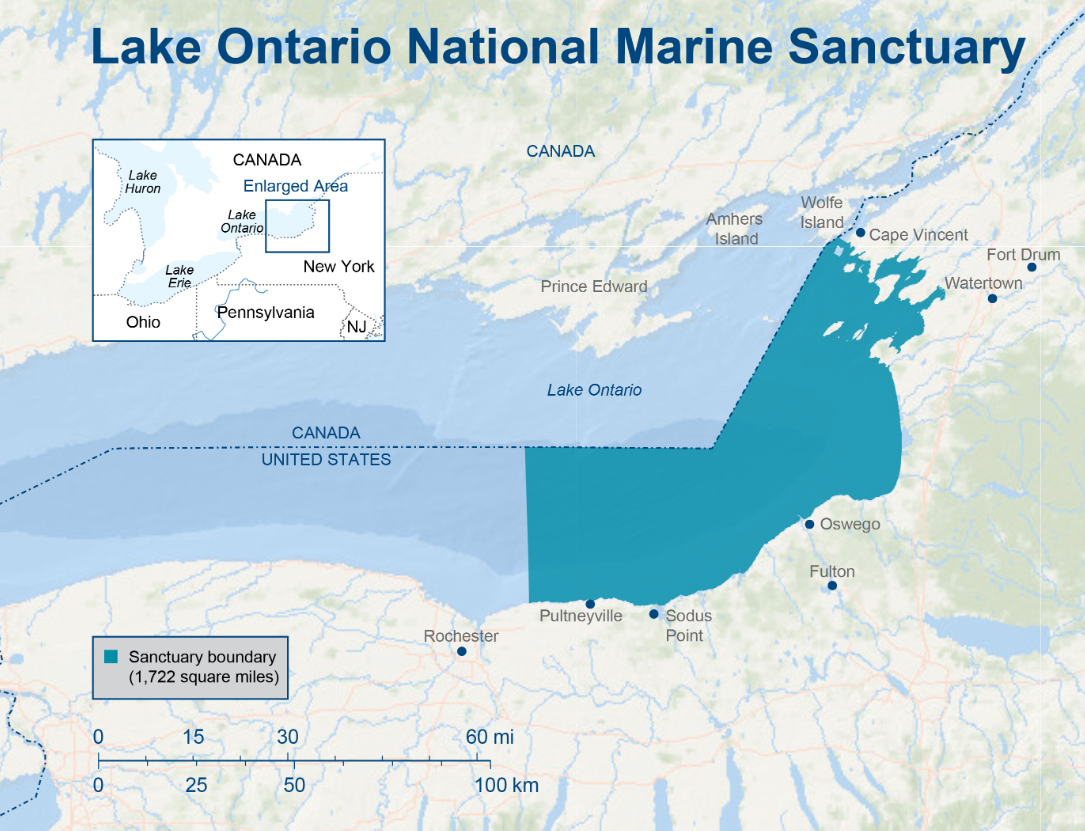
A 2024 map of the Lake Ontario National Marine Sanctuary

The Lake Ontario National Marine Sanctuary covers 1,300 square nautical miles; 4,460 square kilometres (1,722 sq mi) in U.S. waters in southeastern Lake Ontario. Designated on September 6, 2024, the national marine sanctuary protects historic shipwrecks and an area of great cultural, historical, and spiritual importance to the Native American peoples of the Haudenosaunee Confederacy. The National Oceanic and Atmospheric Administration's Office of National Marine Sanctuaries and the Government of New York jointly administer the sanctuary.

== Economic impact ==
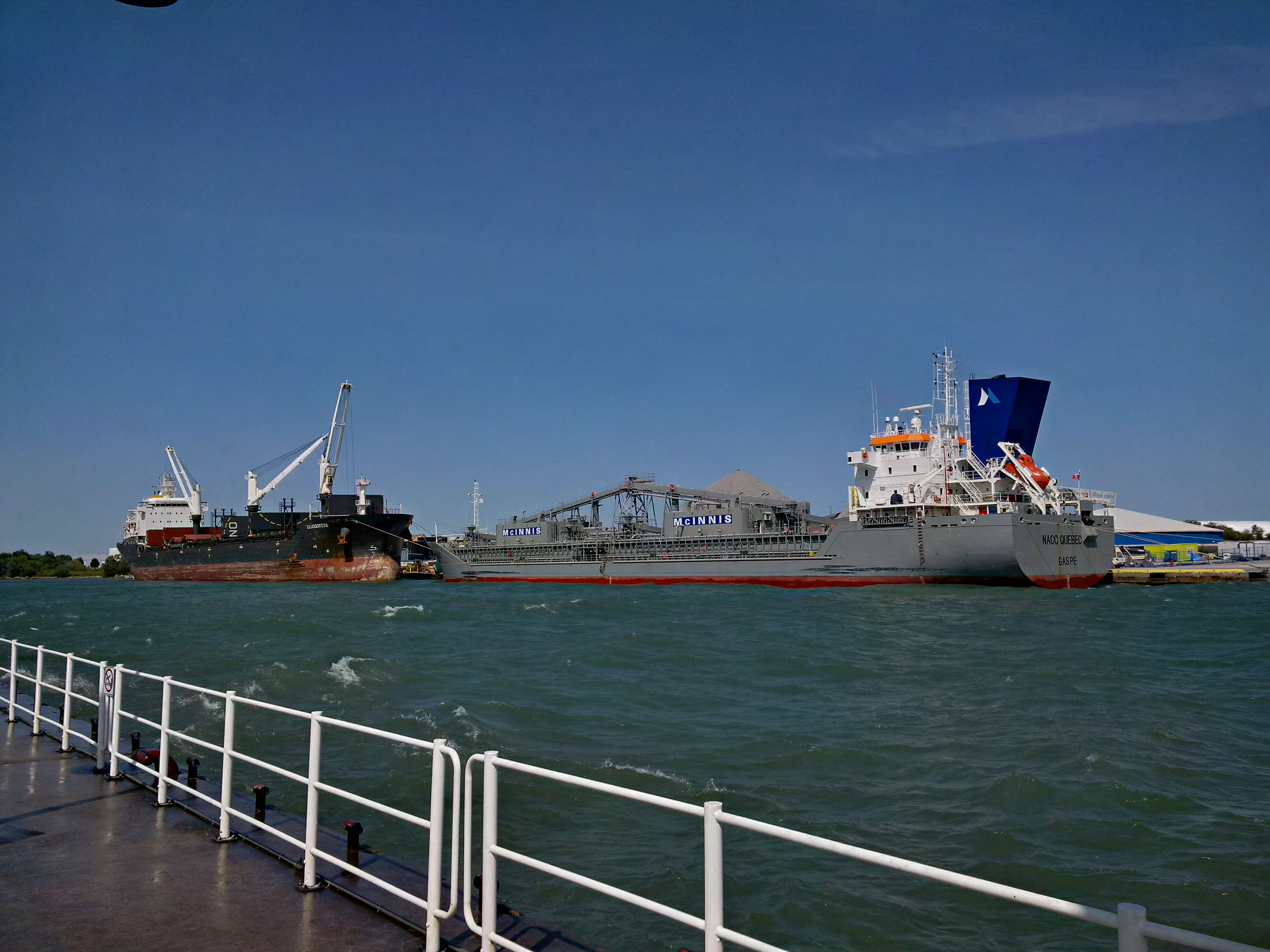
Cargo ships in Oshawa Harbour

Lake Ontario is the site of several major commercial ports including the Port of Toronto and the Port of Hamilton. Hamilton Harbour has major steel production facilities.

The government of Ontario, which holds the lakebed rights of the Canadian portion of the lake under the Beds of Navigable Waters Act, does not permit wind power to be generated offshore. In Trillium Power Wind Corporation v. Ontario (Natural Resources), the Superior Court of Justice held Trillium Power—since 2004 an "Applicant of Record" who had invested $35,000 in fees and, when in 2011 the Crown made a policy decision against offshore windfarms, claimed an injury of $2.25 billion—disclosed no reasonable cause of action.

The Great Lakes once supported an industrial-scale fishery, with record hauls in 1899; overfishing later blighted the industry. However, only recreational fishing activities exist in the 21st century.

== See also ==
- Charity Shoal Crater
- Glacial Lake Admiralty
- Lake Ontario Waterkeeper
- List of lakes of Ontario
