= Oswego Harbor West Pierhead Light =

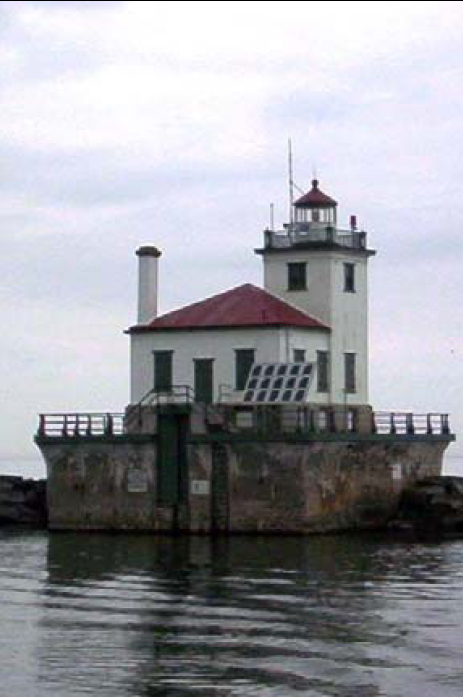
- Location: Oswego, New York
- Coordinates: 43.47332°N 76.51682°W

Tower
- Constructed: 1880
- Foundation: Concrete/masonry caisson
- Construction: Steel and cast iron
- Automated: 1968
- Height: 57 feet (17 meters)
- Shape: square
- Markings: White with red roof and green trim
- Heritage: National Register of Historic Places listed place

Light
- First lit: 1934
- Focal height: 17.5 m (57 ft)
- Lens: Fourth Order Fresnel lens (original), Modern optics (current)
- Range: 9 nmi (17 km; 10 mi)
- Characteristic: Alternating red and OFF flash every 5 seconds
- Oswego West Pierhead Lighthouse
- U.S. National Register of Historic Places
- Location within New York Location within the United States
- Location: Lake Ontario, 0.5 mi. N of Oswego R., Oswego, New York
- Area: less than one acre
- Built: 1934
- Architectural style: lighthouse
- NRHP reference No.: 00001468
- Added to NRHP: December 1, 2000

Oswego Harbor West Pierhead Lighthouse is an active aid to navigation located off the coast of Oswego, New York. It was built in 1934 to replace an earlier light constructed in 1880. It stands at the end of a 2,000-foot-long (610 m) breakwater at mouth of Oswego River, extending one-half mile (0.80 km) out onto Lake Ontario. It is accessible by boat or from land over the abutting breakwater. It is open to the public for tours during the summer. It is owned by the City of Oswego and operated by the United States Coast Guard. It is listed on the National Register of Historic Places.

== History ==
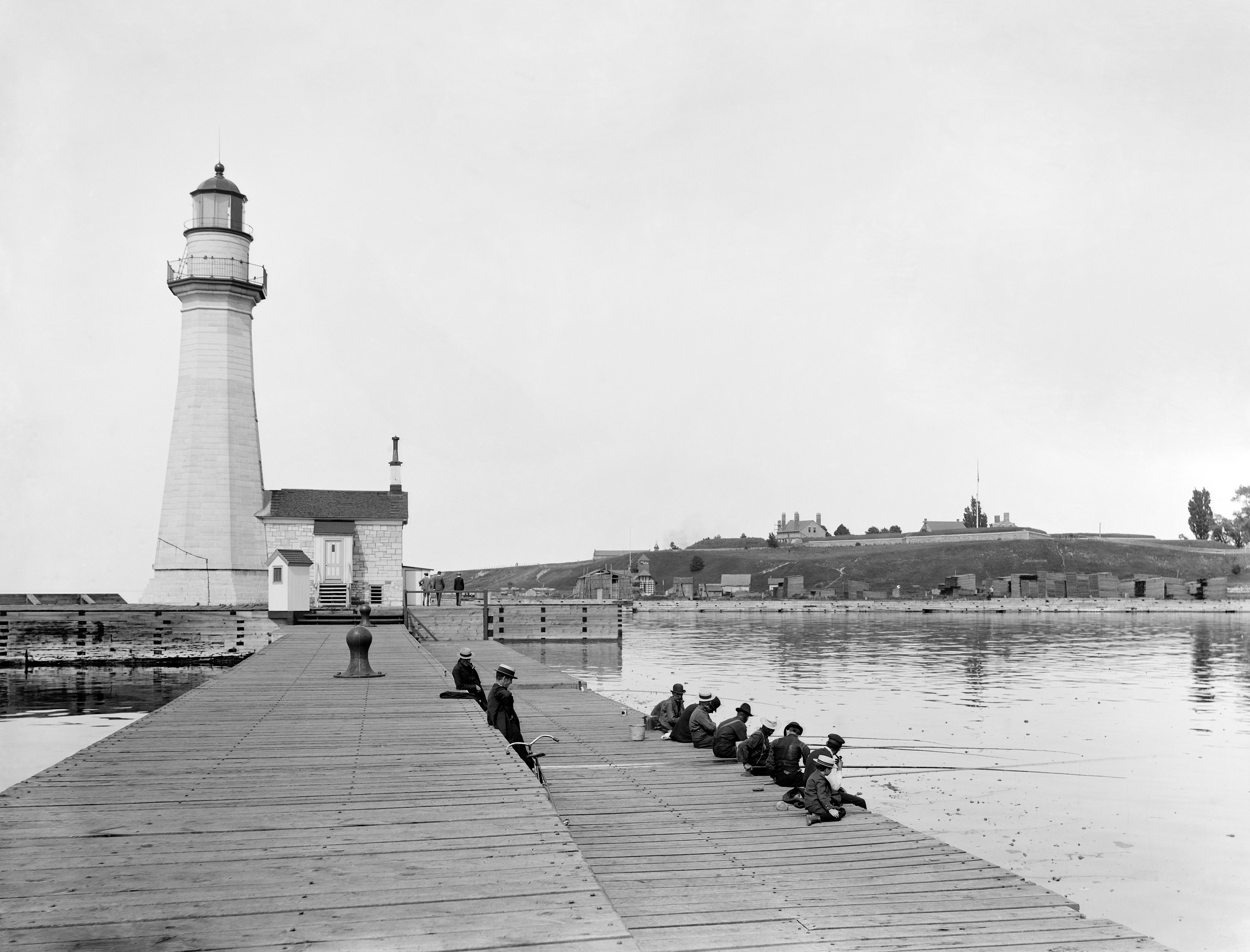
Oswego Lighthouse circa 1900 (the original one, before the current facility)

The original lighthouse on the location was constructed in 1889 when the second breakwater for the harbor was built. This light stood until 1934 when the present lighthouse was constructed. In 1936 an attached one story keeper's quarters was added.

On December 4, 1942, a boat used to transfer keepers of the light capsized during a change of keepers. Six coast guardsmen died in this incident. The station remained staffed until 1968 when it was automated.

The six were:

GINSBURG, IRVING	SN2	OSWEGO STATION	NY
HOLDSWORTH, LESLIE J.	SN1	OSWEGO STATION	NY
JACKSON, KARL H.	BM1	OSWEGO STATION	NY
SPRAW, RALPH J.	MM2	OSWEGO STATION	NY
SISSON, EUGENE C.	BM2	OSWEGO STATION	NY
WILSON, ALSTON G.	LT	OSWEGO STATION	NY

The original fourth order Fresnel lens was removed to the H. Lee White Maritime Museum in Oswego in 1995. In December 2000 the lighthouse was added to the National Register of Historic Places.

It is the only lighthouse of four in Oswego still standing. The light is currently solar powered.

== Construction ==
The tower is situated on a massive concrete/masonry caisson that extends 17 feet (5.2 meters) above the mean surface of the lake. The caisson has three feet (0.91 meters) thick walls.

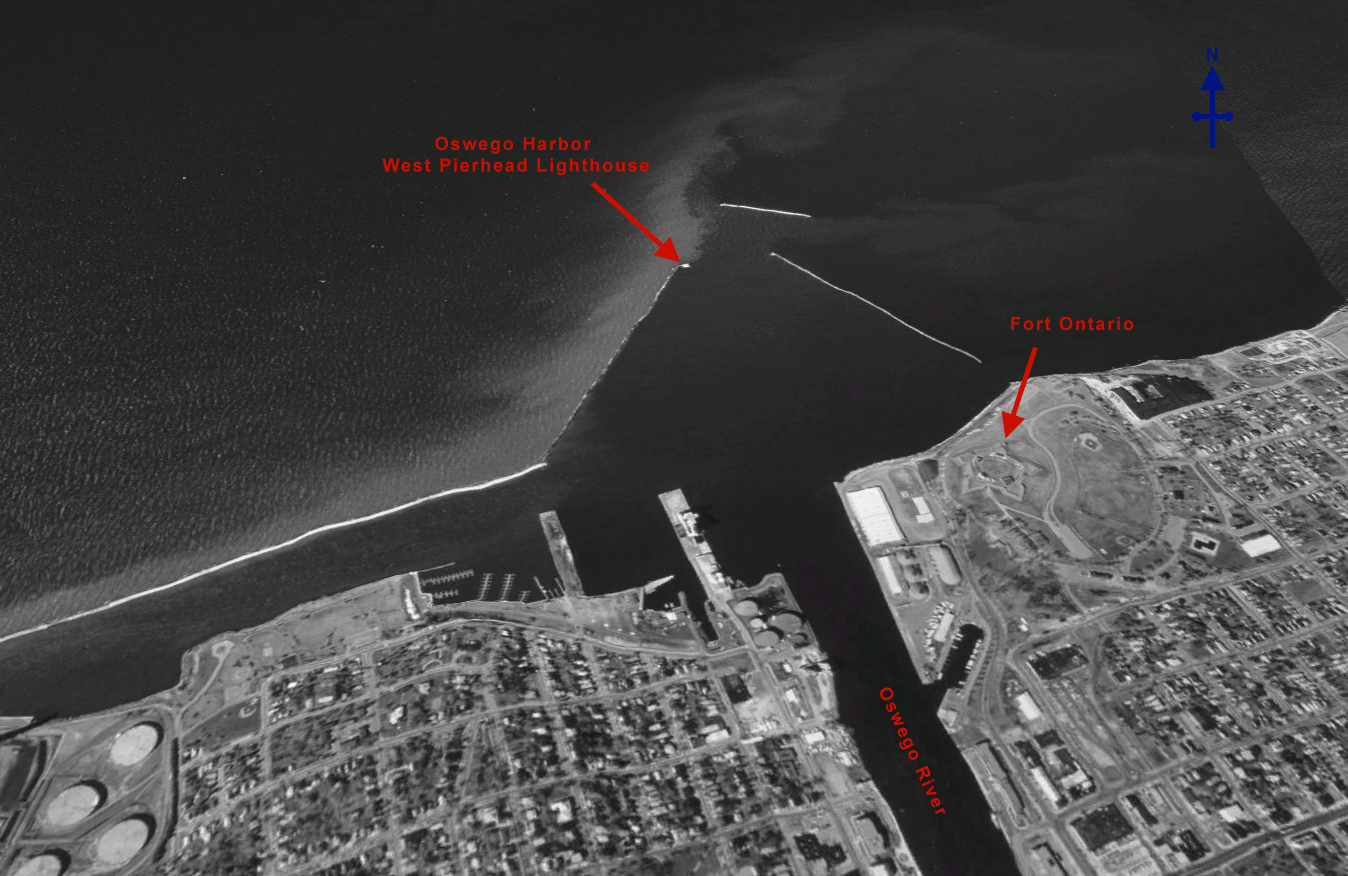
Faux aerial image depicting relative position of the lighthouse to the Oswego waterfront

The superstructure has bolted steel plate and iron walls, roof, doors, window shutters. It has a one-story hipped roof living quarters with a three-story tower at the north east corner of the caisson.

The caisson contains a large basement and is penetrated by double steel doors at the south where a tender may be landed to transfer personnel or supplies and a steel door at the west, leading to the breakwater. Recessed ladders are found at both elevations for access to the doorways and deck above.

The first floor level encloses the living quarters. The interior includes living room, bedroom, kitchen, hallway and bathroom areas. Finishes include plaster walls, vinyl-asbestos floor tiles and varnished wood trim throughout. A steel plate chimney rises through the roof at the southwest corner of the light. The fourth level has a lantern/watch deck and is surmounted by a conical roof with ball finial.

On June 1, 2006, the light station was declared surplus, and the application for transfer under the National Historic Lighthouse Preservation Act of 2000 is complete and it has been recommended for transfer to the City of Oswego.

On May 18, 2009, The General Services Administration conveyed the Oswego West Pierhead Light in New York to the city of Oswego. Acting Regional Administrator Glenn Rotondo signed the deed under the National Historic Lighthouse Preservation Act. Mayor Randolph Bateman received the deed on the city's behalf. The conveyance, which includes the light and keeper's quarters, will become part of the city's waterfront access program. It will remain a working navigational aid maintained by the U.S. Coast Guard.
