= Duck Galloo Ridge =

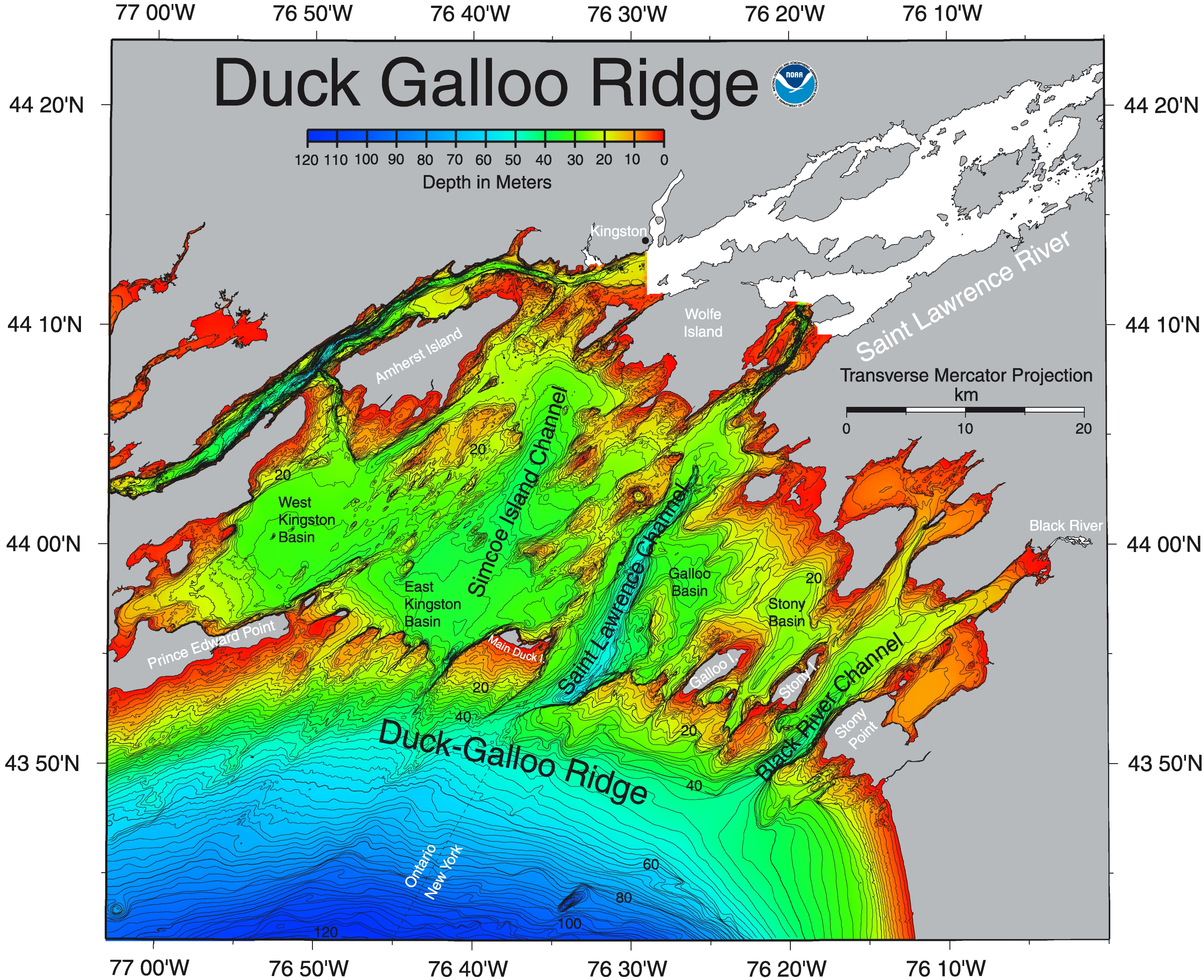
The Duck Galloo Ridge demarcates a portion of Lake Ontario that is much less deep than most of the rest of the lake.

The Duck Galloo Ridge is a mainly underwater ridge, at the eastern end of Lake Ontario, spanning from Prince Edward County, Ontario to Jefferson County, New York. In pre-Columbian times native people used the islands on the ridge as way stations, when crossing the lake. The islands and shoals that dot the ridge have been navigational hazards since sailing ships first started navigating the lake.

== Islands on the ridge ==
Islands and shoals on the Duck Galloo Ridge, from west to east
image	island	area	first lighthouse	notes
	Gull Bar	n.a.		
	Swetman		1829	
	Yorkshire			
	Timber Island			
	Main Duck	570 acres (230 hectares)		
	Galloo	2,210 acres (890 hectares)		
	Little Galloo	44 acres (18 hectares)		

== See also ==
- Scotch Bonnet Ridge
- Salmon Point Ridge
- Point Petre Ridge
