= Camp House =

Camp House may refer to:

in New Zealand

- Camp House (Taranaki), a Heritage New Zealand property in Taranaki

in the United States

- Moses Camp House, Winsted, Connecticut, listed on the National Register of Historic Places (NRHP) in Litchfield County
- Elam-Camp House, Gordon, Georgia, NRHP-listed
- Elisha Camp House, Sackets Harbor, New York, NRHP-listed
- Hermon Camp House, Trumansburg, New York, NRHP-listed
- William Nelson Camp, Jr., House, Fairview, North Carolina, NRHP-listed
- Camp-Woods, Villanova, Pennsylvania, a historic house, NRHP-listed
- Greystone (Knoxville, Tennessee), also known as Camp House
- William and Medora Camp House, Greenville, Texas, NRHP-listed in Hunt County
- Thomas Camp Farmhouse, Menomonee Falls, Wisconsin, NRHP-listed in Waukesha County
