= Swetman Island =

Island located in the south of Picton, Ontario

Coordinates: 43.948°N 76.804°W

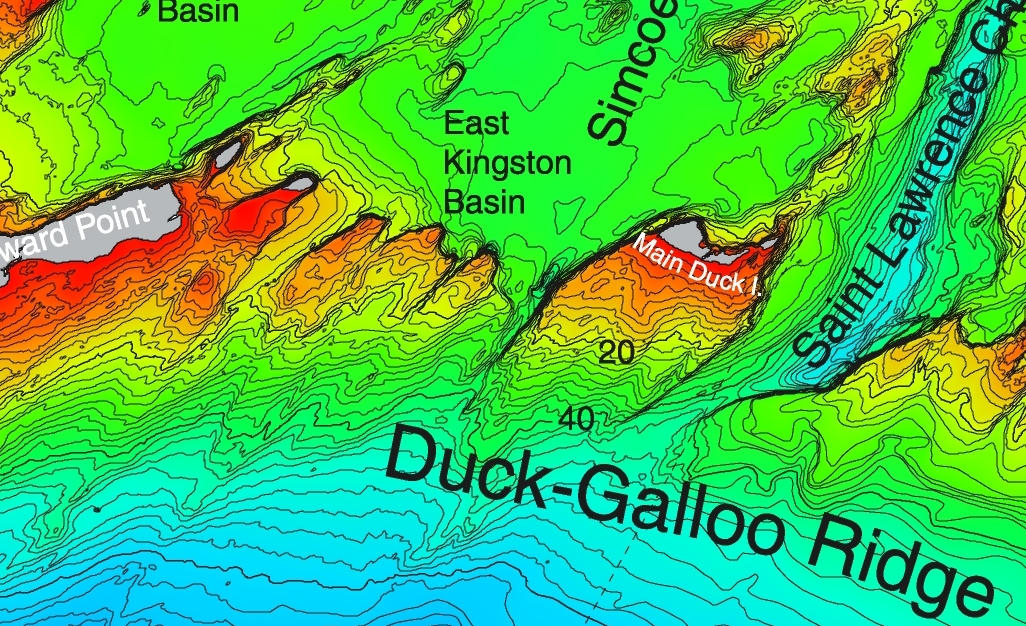
Swetman Island is the 2nd island from the left in this chain

Swetman Island, formerly False Duck Island, is a small Canadian island in Lake Ontario, south of Picton, Ontario. It is the largest island in a chain of islands and shoals known as the False Duck Islands, not to be confused with the nearby Main Duck Islands. Nearby Timber Island is also considered part of the False Duck Islands. The False Duck Islands, the Main Duck Islands, and Galloo Island and Stony Island on the US side, and their associated shoals, form the Duck Galloo Ridge.

The first stone lighthouse on the island was built in 1829. A second, taller lighthouse, built from concrete, replaced the original lighthouse in 1865. It was changed to automated operation in 1989.

== See also ==
- Main Duck Island
