= Timber Island =

Island in Canada

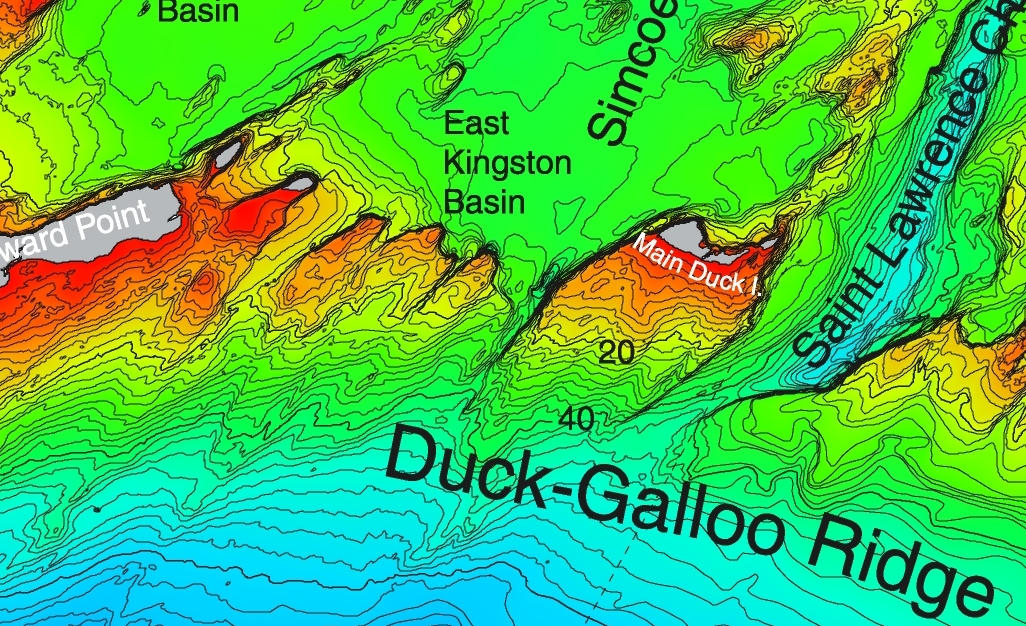
- Timber Island is the westernmost island in this chain.
- Interactive map of Timber Island

Geography
- Location: Lake Ontario
- Coordinates: 43°57′28″N 76°50′15″W

Administration
- Canada
- Province: Ontario

Demographics
- Population: 0 (1978)

Timber Island is a 44-hectare (110-acre) island in the east end of Lake Ontario, off Prince Edward County, Canada. It is part of a chain of islands and shoals, including Stoney Island, Galloo Island, Main Duck Island, Yorkshire Island and Swetman Island. Timber Island and Swetman Island, and their nearby shoals, are known as the False Duck Islands.

The island used to be home to bald eagles.

The island was donated to the province by its owner, Barbara Cody, in 1962.

The island is currently part of the Sandbanks Provincial Park, visitors are allowed, after getting the permission of the park superintendent. Most of the island is covered by an oak-hickory forest. Plants rare to eastern Ontario are found on the island. The island provides a resting spot for birds on their annual migration.
