= Yorkshire Island =

Island in Ontario, Canada

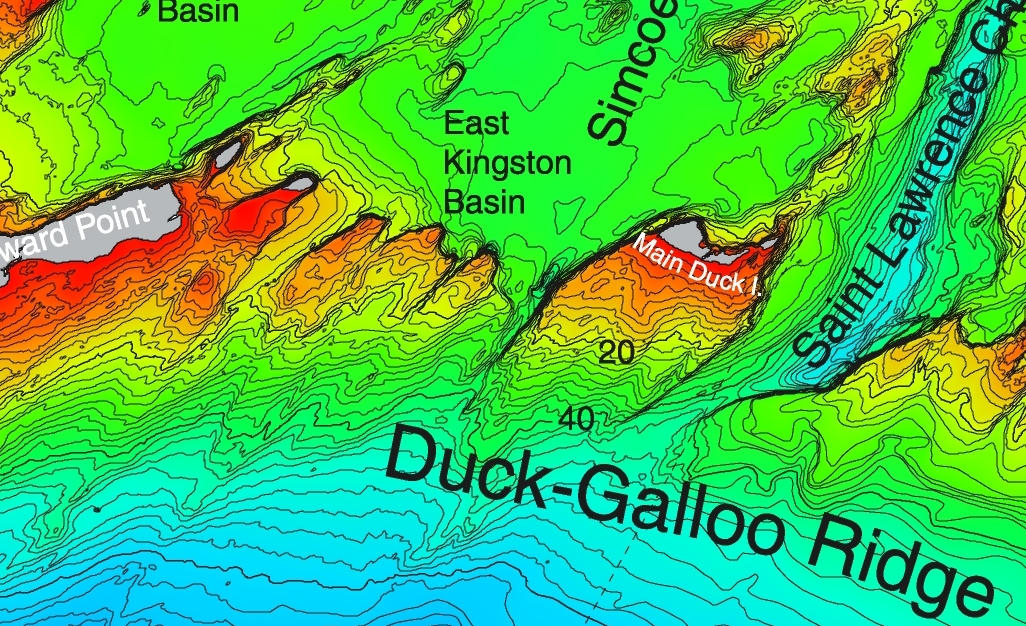
- Yorkshire Island is the small island 400 meters east of Main Duck Island
- Interactive map of Yorkshire Island

Geography
- Location: Lake Ontario
- Coordinates: 43°55′43″N 76°35′13″W

Administration
- Canada
- Province: Ontario

Demographics
- Population: 0 (1978)

Yorkshire Island is a small island in the east end of Lake Ontario, off Prince Edward County. It is part of a chain of islands, including Stoney Island, Galloo Island, Main Duck Island, and Swetman Island and Timber Island, the False Duck Islands. It was acquired by Parks Canada, in 1977, to preserve as nature preserves.

Main Duck Island is the closest island in the chain, approximately 0.25 miles (400 m) east.

Joseph O. Doyle was shipwrecked on the Island, for 18 days, in 1858.
