= Horse Island Light =

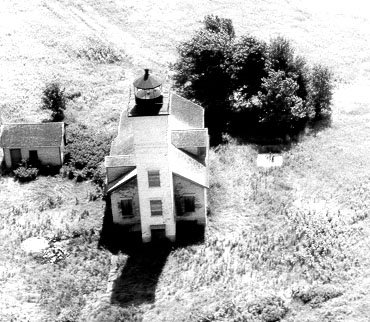
- Location: Horse Island, Sackets Harbor, Jefferson County, United States
- Coordinates: 43°56′35″N 76°08′40″W

Tower
- Constructed: 1831
- Construction: limestone (foundation), brick (tower)
- Automated: 1957
- Height: 21 m (69 ft)
- Shape: square
- Markings: White (tower), black (lantern)

Light
- First lit: 1870
- Deactivated: 1957
- Lens: fifth order Fresnel lens
- Active light
- Constructed: 1957
- Construction: steel
- Focal height: 57 ft (17 m)
- Range: 5 mi (8.0 km)
- Characteristic: Fl W 2.5s

Horse Island Light, also known as Sackets Harbor Light, is located on Horse Island in Sackets Harbor, Jefferson County in New York on Lake Ontario. In July 2017 the 24-acre island was acquired for preservation by the Civil War Trust, aided by a grant from the National Park Service. This was the first grant in the United States made for a War of 1812 site under the NPS battlefield grants program.

== History ==
Horse Island Light is listed on the National Park Service's Maritime Heritage Program as a "Lighthouse to Visit" and as one of New York's Historic Light Stations.

A modern steel skeletal tower replaced the lighthouse as an Aid to Navigation in 1957, and the lighthouse and property were sold. It is now in private hands and not open to the public. The keepers quarters were built in 1870, and consisted of a 1 1/2 story Queen Anne/Italianate brick house. There was also a barn and oil house on the property.

During the War of 1812, the British used Horse Island as a staging area before the Battle of Sackett's Harbor. In July 2017, the 24-acre Horse Island, located near the village, was acquired for preservation by the Civil War Trust, aided by a grant from the National Park Service. It was the site of a War of 1812 engagement. This was the first time in the US that a grant from the American Battlefield Land Grant program has been used to preserve a War of 1812 site.

The lighthouse keeper at one time was Schuyler Shibley Simmons.
