= Seaway Trail Discovery Center =

Coordinates: 43°56′54.5″N 76°07′23″W

The Seaway Trail Discovery Center is a museum located in Sackets Harbor, New York that offers a wide range of exhibits about the culture and heritage of the Great Lakes Seaway Trail and surrounding regions. The Seaway Trail is a 504-mile (811 km) National Scenic Byway in the United States, mostly in New York but with a small segment in Pennsylvania.

The museum is located in the historic Union Hotel and was opened in July 2000 by the New York State Office of Parks, Recreation and Preservation to provide visitors with an overview of the Seaway Trail, the State's only scenic byway. It includes exhibits on the history, architecture and natural resources of St. Lawrence, Jefferson, Oswego, Cayuga, Wayne, Monroe, Orleans, Niagara, Erie and Chautauqua counties, those that surround the Great Lakes. The center's exhibits also focused on the region's 27 historic lighthouses, local battles during the War of 1812, and famous residents including: Susan B. Anthony, Frederic Remington and George Eastman.

In addition to historical exhibits, the center also features exhibits and lectures with content that applies to the daily lives and residents of the region. Its work is believed to contribute to providing visitors with a greater understanding of how its agricultural heritage shaped the region and allow residents to understand how heritage tourism can help develop and grow the region.
