= Union Hotel (Sackets Harbor, New York) =

- U.S. National Register of Historic Places
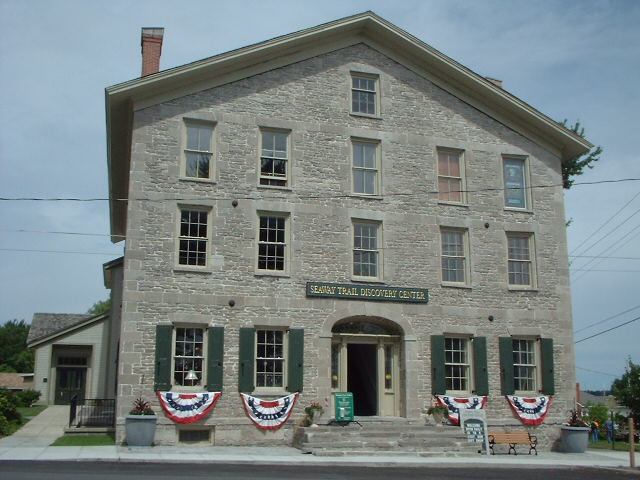
- Union Hotel, Sackets Harbor, NY, August 2008

- Location within New York Location within the United States
- Location: Main and Ray Sts., Sackets Harbor, New York
- Coordinates: 43°56′55″N 76°7′24″W
- Area: 0 acres (0 ha)
- Built: 1817–1818
- Architectural style: Federal
- NRHP reference No.: 72000849
- Added to NRHP: June 19, 1972

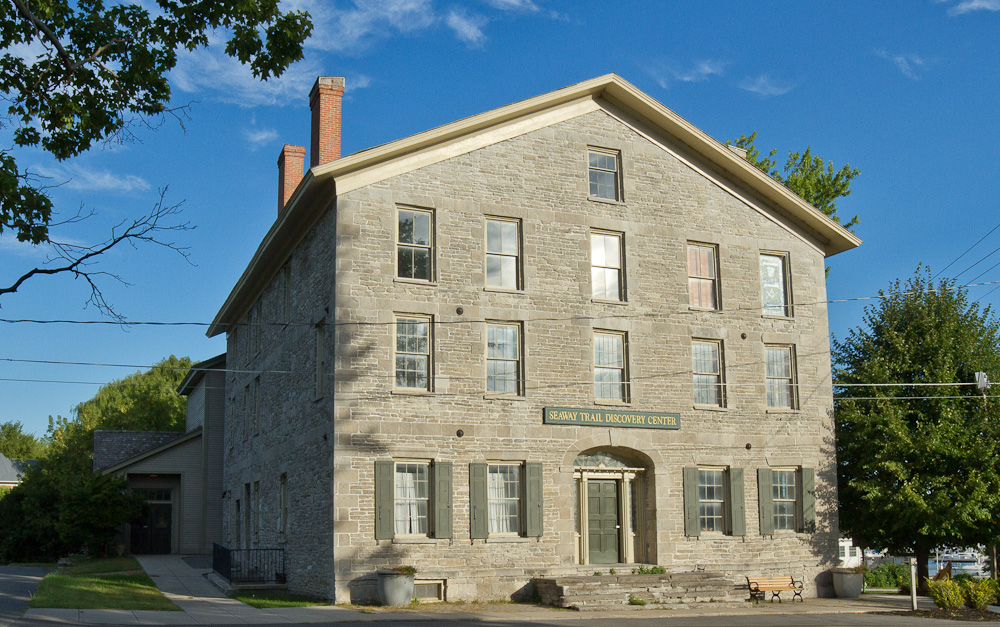
Union Hotel, 2018

Union Hotel, also known as Barrow's Hotel, is a historic hotel located at Sackets Harbor in Jefferson County, New York. It is a 3 1/2-story stone building, 51 feet by 69 feet, over a full basement. The original structure was built in 1817–1818. The interior features distinctive Federal woodwork. It functioned as a hotel into the 1860s, then was used as a Masonic Lodge. In 1972 New York State acquired the building and rehabilitated it for use as the Visitor Center for the Sackets Harbor Battlefield State Historic Site. In July 2000, an addition was built and it was converted to serve as the Seaway Trail Discovery Center.

It was listed on the National Register of Historic Places in 1972.
