= Galloo Island Light =

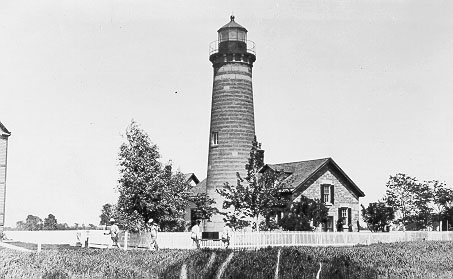
- Location: Lake Ontario
- Coordinates: 43°53′18″N 76°26′42″W

Tower
- Constructed: 1820
- Foundation: Dressed stone/timber
- Construction: Gray limestone w/ brick lining
- Automated: 1963
- Height: 55 feet (17 m)
- Shape: Conical
- Markings: Natural
- Heritage: National Register of Historic Places listed place
- Fog signal: none

Light
- First lit: 1867 (current tower)
- Deactivated: 2011
- Focal height: 58 feet (18 m)
- Lens: Fourth order Fresnel lens (original), 7.5-inch (190 mm) (current)
- Range: 11 nautical miles (20 km; 13 mi)
- Characteristic: Flashing white, 6s
- Galloo Island Light
- U.S. National Register of Historic Places
- Nearest city: Sackets Harbor, New York
- Area: 2.5 acres (1.0 ha)
- Built: 1866
- MPS: U.S. Coast Guard Lighthouses and Light Stations on the Great Lakes TR
- NRHP reference No.: 83001682
- Added to NRHP: August 04, 1983

Galloo Island Light is a historic lighthouse that is located the South Western side of the island of Galloo. It is found six miles off the mainland of Jefferson Country which is part of the state of New York. According to its location, it falls under the jurisdiction of the town of Hounsfield. The light tower and the majority of the island are privately owned. However, because of the law, the Coast Guard is permitted to cross into this private property because of the light in the tower that is used to guide ships. The lighthouse is a fixed white light that produces a beam that is visible at a maximum distance of 15 miles. It also consists of a steam whistle that it sounds when the weather turns foggy. The whistle blows for 10 seconds and then it is silent for 30 seconds. The island does not have a harbor and landings have to be made from smaller boats. Today it stands tall and abandoned, overlooking the waves.

== Galloo Island ==
The island, on which this lighthouse is constructed, covers approximately 3.46 mi^{2} . At its furthest point, the island spans a total of 4.47 mi in length and has a breadth of 1.49 mi. It also covers a total of 2,217 by 28.8 acres of land respectively. At 2^{3/8} miles WNW, Stony Island is the closest island to this land mass. This island, previously spelled "Galloup", sits on the eastern side of Lake Ontario and can be located near the entrance of the Sackets Harbor. It sits on the outer edge of a group of islands and shoals which guard the entrance to Sackets Harbor and the Saint Lawrence River. The island was placed on auction and is currently owned by its highest bidder: Cara C. Dibnah. She comes from Vallejo, California.

== History ==
On April 21, 1818, legislation was passed so that a huge portion of Galloo island could be officially handed over to the government of the United States of America for the sole purpose of erecting a lighthouse. Congress had set aside $12,500 for the construction of this lighthouse which was to be built in the Southwest end so that it could mark the outer lying islands and shoals that the ships frequently came across when traveling to St. Lawrence River or the nearby Sackets Harbor. The first light on the island was established in 1820. Magazines and Gazette published this happening. The government paid David. O a total amount of $411 for the 30 acres near the southwestern part of the island that had been designated for the lighthouse. The construction of the tower and its dwelling was handed over to Elisha Ely. On 15 February 1823, Galloo island fell under the legal protection of Elisha Camp. It was then annexed to the town of Hounsfield. The construction of the lighthouse was finally completed in 1867. After much lobbying from the lighthouse keepers, the light was finally automated in 1963. In the year 1983, it was added to the National Register of Historic places as the first lighthouse to be erected in Lake Ontario. The lighthouse was abandoned and in August 1999, the island was purchased by a private company called PRK Holdings Group of Syracuse. The tower and the keeper's house went on auction set up by the U.S General Services Administration Building Office of Surplus Property on the 27th of September 2000. This is now owned privately by Cara Dibnah,

== Keepers ==
- Zenas Hastings (1820 – 1837)
- Goodale Lewis (1837 – 1839)
- John Pringle (1839 – 1849)
- Benjamin Henshaw (1849 – 1850)
- John Gill (1850 – 1851)
- Benjamin Henshaw (1851– 1853)
- Kendall Hursley (1853 – 1861)
- Theophilus Stevens (1861 – 1870)
- William W. Harris (1870 – 1871)
- Warren Fuller (1871 – 1876)
- Filander Lyman (1876)
- F. Byron Johnson (1876 – 1906)
- Robert C. Graves (1906 – 1933)
- Wylie E. Koepka (1933 – 1942)
- Harry L. Klein (1942 – 1946)

== Dimensions ==
=== Premises ===
The premises adjoining the lighthouse is of reasonable size. The entire site covers approximately 30 acres. Due to erosion by water and wind, this size has been currently reduced to 27 acres. The entire premises are enclosed for the purposes of protecting the lighthouse keeper from strong winds and harsh weather during storms. The highest watermark is approximately 200 feet from the tower. The area is cordoned off with a wooden fence. The nearest post office is approximately 12 mi away in Henderson, NY. The dwelling is attached to the lighthouse through a passageway. The building has a Grey limestone color. It consists of 6 rooms in total all at the disposal of one keeper at a time. Some of the lands nearby is cultivated to the Garden. Around 1/8th of an acre is dedicated to this. The premises also contain an assistant keeper’s dwelling that is located 50 feet in the North Westerly direction form the main tower. This too contains 6 rooms besides closets and a number of bathrooms. Similarly, it contains 1/8th acre of land for the Garden and about 3 acres is used for cultivating and producing food to lower costs of transporting absolutely everything from nearby towns.

=== Lighthouse, lantern, and whistle ===
The lantern is supported by the tower. The tower is primarily a circular shape which forms a conical shape from top to bottom when viewed sideways. There is only one other separate light. The tower covers a total of 60 feet when measured from the base to the top of the ventilator ball. The height of the focal plane above means high water is about 58 feet and 3 inches. The lighthouse is in Grey color and most of its base is made out of a 4-inch-thick wall so that the tower can withstand strong winds.

The lantern has a polygonal shape and is 6 feet and 10 inches in diameter. It has a total of 10 sides and most of its bars are vertical. The lantern doors and the floor of the lantern are both made out of cast iron.

The steam whistle that is blown during fog is about 10 inches in diameter. It is operated by Crosby Automatic Apparatus. It was manufactured by a local company called Thomson Kingsford based in Oswego, NY. It has a total height of about 20 inches. It is placed at the top of the lighthouse building.
