= USRC Active (1843) =

Ship of the U.S. Revenue Cutter Service

History

United States
- Name: USRC Active
- Namesake: In action; moving; causing action or change
- Completed: 1843
- Commissioned: 1843
- Decommissioned: 1847

General characteristics
- Type: Revenue boat

USRC Active, was a revenue boat of the United States Revenue Cutter Service in commission from 1843 to 1847. She was the fourth Revenue Cutter Service ship to bear the name.

== History ==
Built at Sackets Harbor, New York, in 1843, Active was based there and served on Lake Ontario. She was under the command of First Lieutenant William B. Whitehead. She appears to have left service in 1847.

== Notes ==
=== References ===
- "Active, 1843". U.S. Coast Guard Cutters & Craft Index. U.S. Coast Guard Historian's Office.
- Canney, Donald L. (1995). U.S. Coast Guard and Revenue Cutters, 1790–1935. Naval Institute Press, Annapolis, Maryland. ISBN 978-1-55750-101-1.
- Noble, Dennis L. (1990). Historical Register U.S. Revenue Cutter Service Officers, 1790–1914 (PDF). Coast Guard Historian's Office, U.S. Coast Guard Headquarters, Washington, DC.
