= Sackets Harbor Battlefield State Historic Site =

- Sackets Harbor Battlefield
- U.S. National Register of Historic Places
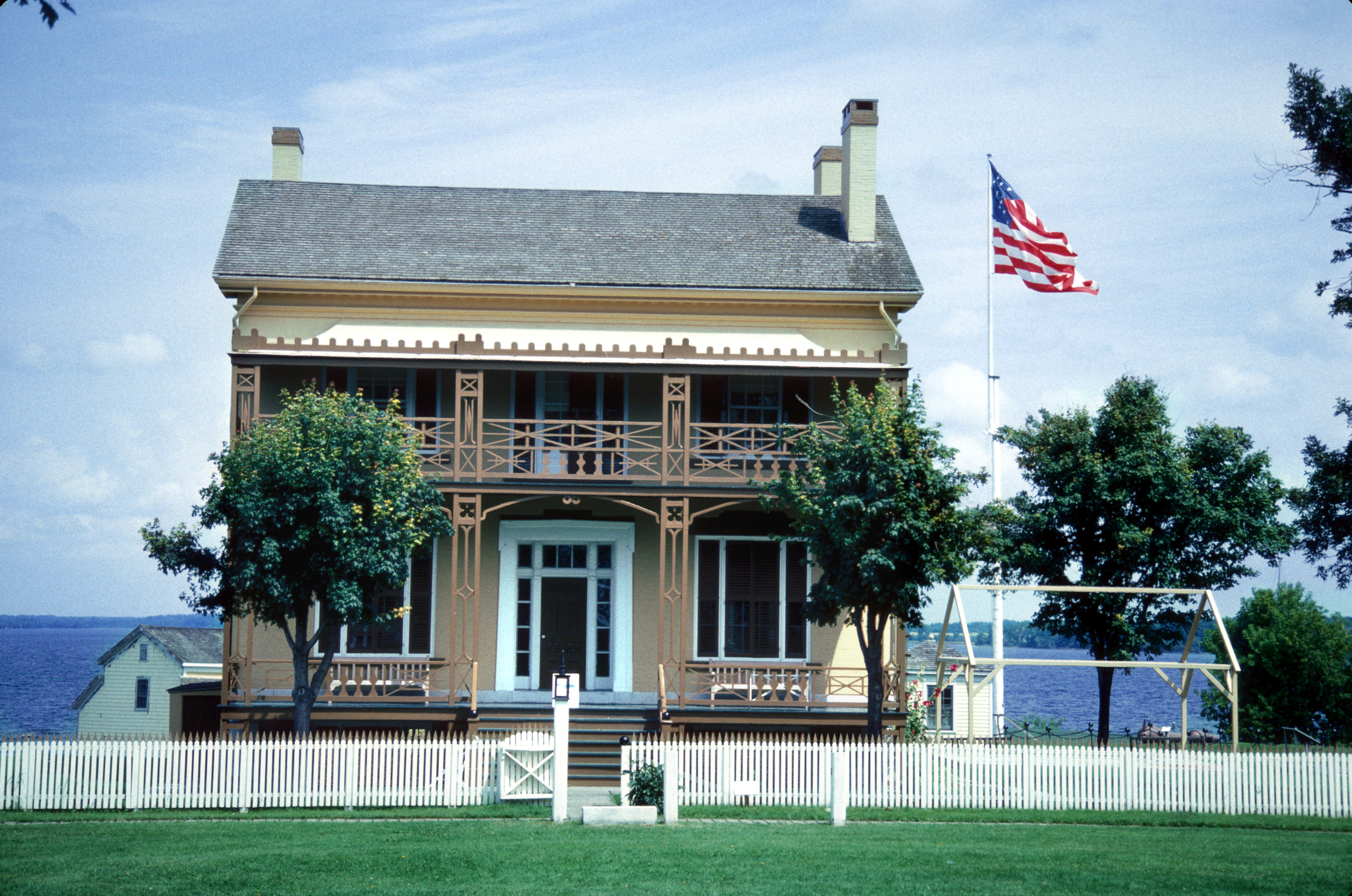

- Location within New York Location within the United States
- Location: Coastline and area from Sackets Harbor SW to and including Horse Island, Sackets Harbor, New York
- Coordinates: 43°56′43″N 76°7′59″W
- Area: 260 acres (110 ha)
- Built: 1812
- NRHP reference No.: 74001247
- Added to NRHP: December 31, 1974

Sackets Harbor Battlefield State Historic Site is a historically important location in Jefferson County, New York, United States. The historic site is south of the Village of Sackets Harbor, bordering Lake Ontario in the Town of Hounsfield. Two battles were fought near this location during the War of 1812. Some 3,000 men worked at the shipyard building warships, and the village was fortified and garrisoned with thousands of troops.

The site includes exhibits, a restored 1850s Navy Yard and Commandant's House, outdoor signs, and guided and self-guided tours. During the summer months, interpretive guides, in regimental style, re-enact a soldier's camp life in 1813.

It was listed on the National Register of Historic Places in 1974. The battlefield designation includes the 24-acre Horse Island, the site of some British action during the Second Battle of Sacket's Harbor. In July 2017, the Civil War Trust (now the American Battlefield Trust) announced that it had acquired the island for preservation, under the first grant in the United States made for a War of 1812 site by the National Park Service's American Battlefield Land Grant program. The American Battlefield Trust and its partners have saved more than 25 acres of the battlefield as of mid-2023.

== See also ==
- Battle of Sacket's Harbor
- List of New York State Historic Sites
- Horse Island Light
