= Sackets Harbor Village Historic District =

Historic district in New York, United States

- U.S. National Register of Historic Places
- U.S. Historic district
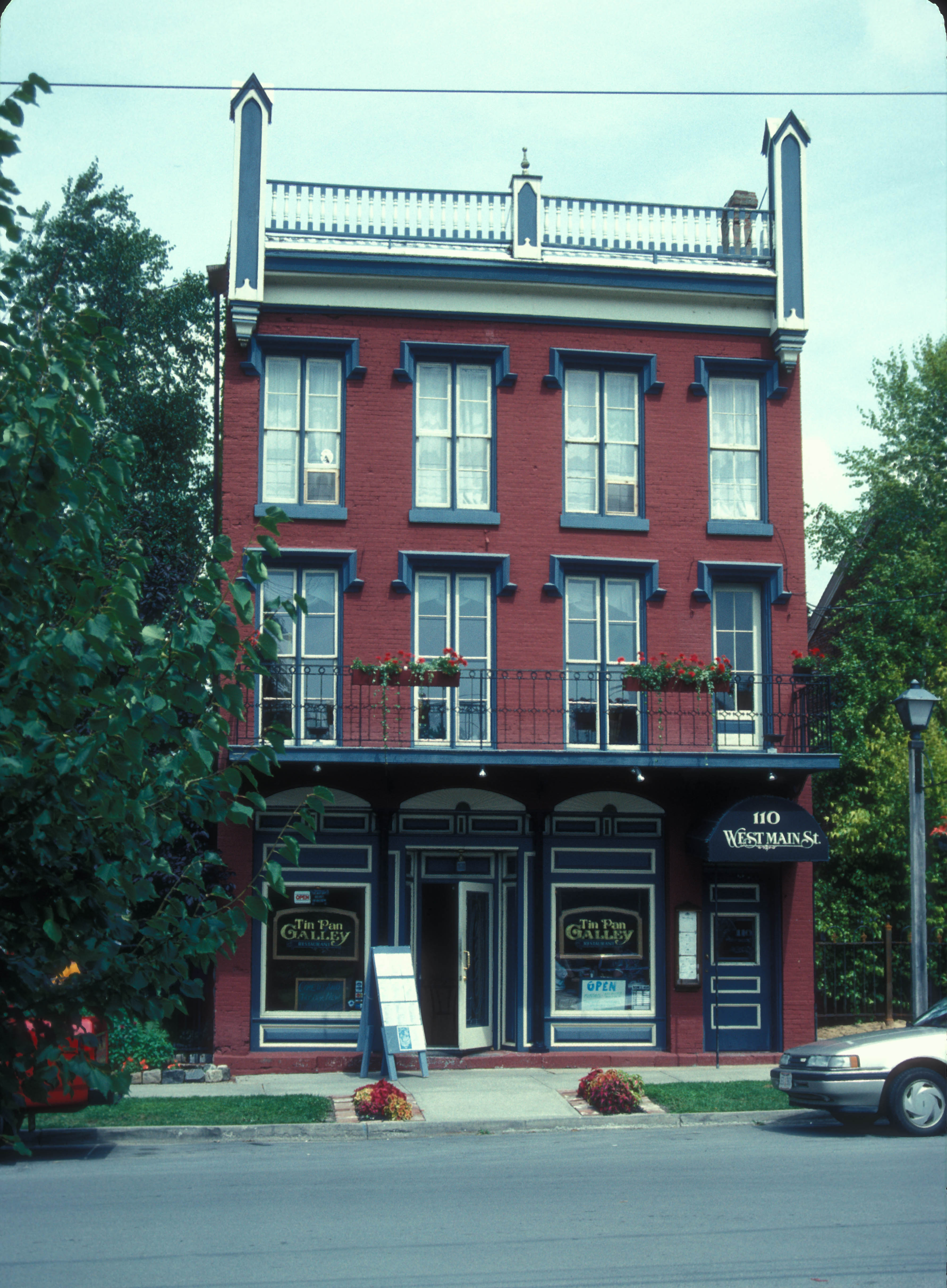

- Location within New York Location within the United States
- Location: Main, Washington, Pike, Edmund, Hill, Hamilton, Broad, and Ambrose Sts., Sackets Harbor, New York
- Coordinates: 43°56′44″N 76°7′10″W
- Area: 71 acres (29 ha)
- Built: 1801
- Architect: Multiple
- Architectural style: Greek Revival, Mixed (more Than 2 Styles From Different Periods)
- NRHP reference No.: 83001683
- Added to NRHP: September 15, 1983

Sackets Harbor Village Historic District is a national historic district located at Sackets Harbor in Jefferson County, New York. The district includes 143 contributing buildings, among a total of 156 buildings in the historic central core of the village. The majority of the buildings were constructed during the first century of European-American settlement, 1801 to 1900.

It was listed on the National Register of Historic Places in 1983.
