= John A. Lanning House =

Historic house in North Carolina, United States

- U.S. National Register of Historic Places
- Location within North Carolina Location within the United States
- Location: W of Fairview on SR 3128, near Fairview, North Carolina
- Coordinates: 35°31′15″N 82°25′56″W
- Area: 6 acres (2.4 ha)
- Built: 1839
- NRHP reference No.: 82003437
- Added to NRHP: September 23, 1982

John A. Lanning House is a historic home located near Fairview, Buncombe County, North Carolina. It was built in 1839, and is a 1 1/2-story, rectangular saddlebag form dwelling. It consists of two sections connected by a central fieldstone chimney. It features full length shed porches. Also on the property are the contributing log double corn crib, a double pen log barn and a barrel house where the owner operated a government licensed still.

It was listed on the National Register of Historic Places in 1982.
