= Little Galloo Island =

Island in Jefferson County, New York, United States

- Interactive map of Little Galloo Island

Geography
- Location: Lake Ontario near Sackets Harbor, Jefferson County, New York
- Coordinates: 43.8858952°N 76.3952165°W
- Area: 0.068 sq mi (0.18 km^{2})
- Length: 0.38 mi (0.61 km)
- Highest elevation: 253 ft (77.1 m)

Administration
- United States

Little Galloo Island is located in eastern Lake Ontario near the entrance to Sackets Harbor in Jefferson County, New York, within the jurisdiction of the Town of Hounsfield.

The small island is a protected area, and one of the very few uninhabited islands in eastern Lake Ontario.

== Geography ==
Little Galloo Island is approximately 5 mi (8.0 km) from the New York mainland, and 7 mi (11 km) southeast of the international boundary with Canada.

It is one of a group of four nearby islands which includes Galloo Island, Calf Island, and Stony Island.

== Natural features and wildlife ==
Most of the island is covered by herbaceous vegetation, with a few trees located primarily around the perimeter.

Ring-billed gulls have nested on Little Galloo Island since 1938, and in 1990 there were 84,230 nesting pairs, one of the largest nesting concentrations in North America. The double-crested cormorant was first reported breeding on the island in 1967. Other birds that have been noted on the island include the black-crowned night heron, cattle egret, herring gull, great black-backed gull, Caspian tern, and common tern.

The rocky waters and shoals near the island provide spawning habitat for smallmouth bass, lake trout, yellow perch, white perch, brown bullhead, rock bass, and pumpkinseed.

Historian Jeff Alexander described Little Galloo Island as "an ugly duckling, at least aesthetically. Its terrain and brushy vegetation don't make the 40-acre island a destination for tourists. For birds, it is an entirely different story."

== History ==
In 1823, patents were issued to Elisha Camp for most of Little Galloo, Gallo, and Calf islands, along with several other islands.

A historical map from 1887 documented a structure on the island, though no extant structures still exist.

In 1998, Phillips Petroleum donated the island to the New York State Department of Environmental Conservation (NYSDEC). The island was then designated a "wildlife management area", used to protect and promote fish and wildlife resources.

=== Conflict over cormorants ===
The cormorant population on Little Galloo Island grew significantly through the 1980s and 1990s as a result of ample food supplies, pollution control measures, and state and federal protection.

As the cormorant population grew, so did the suspicion that its predation was causing a decline in fish populations.

Because tourism and fishing were a significant contributor to the local economy on the mainland, some residents felt the cormorants threatened their livelihoods and traditional lifestyles.

The NYSDEC obtained permits to curb the population on the island. As well, a study begun in 1998 suggested the smallmouth bass stocks in eastern Lake Ontario were being depleted by the cormorants. Before the NYSDEC could take action, a group of men from the local community illegally shot 850 birds in July 1998.

Local schools have taken action to revive wildlife on the island.
