= Sherrill's Inn =

Historic house in North Carolina, United States

- U.S. National Register of Historic Places
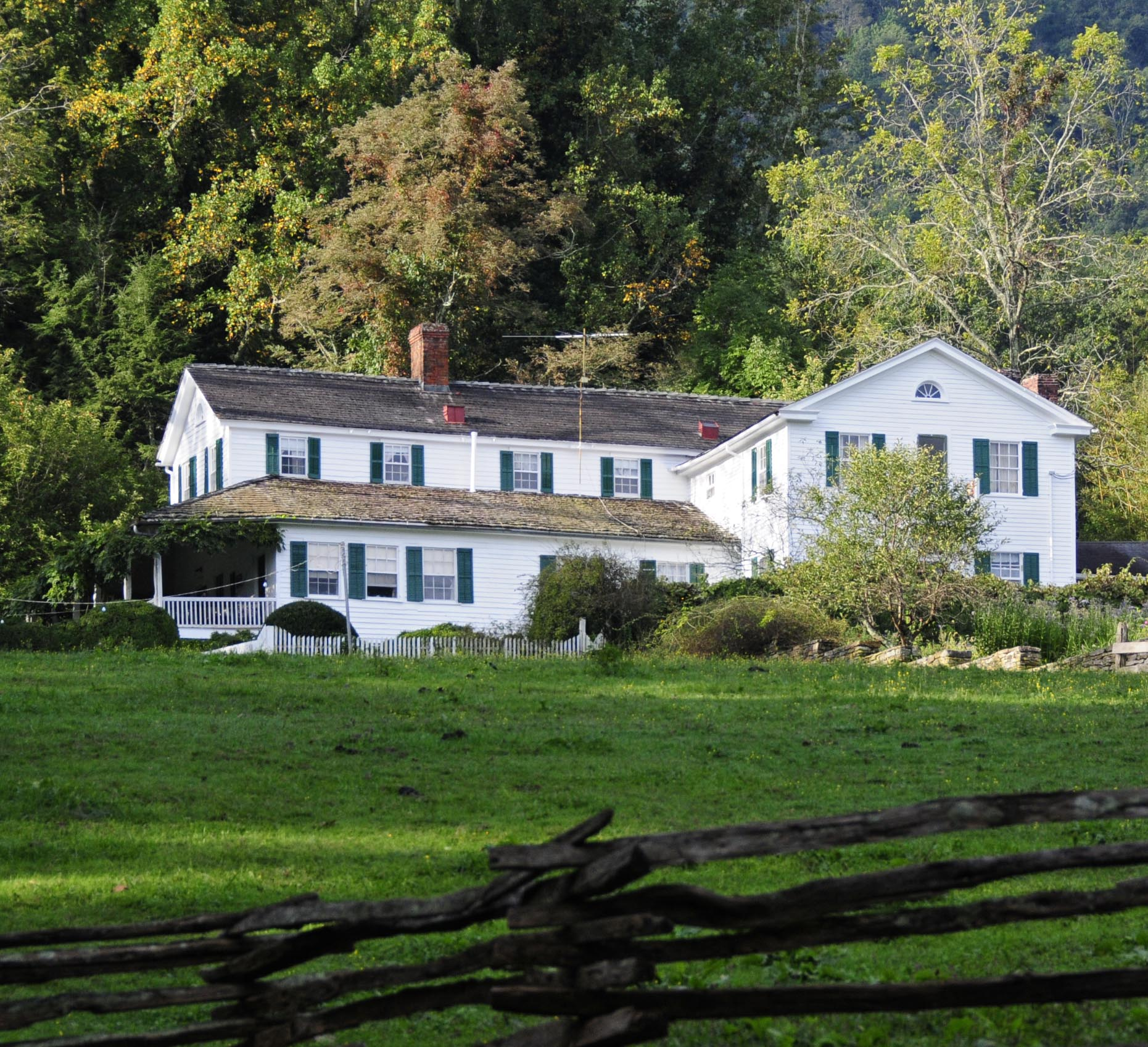
- Sherril's Inn, September 2012

- Location within North Carolina Location within the United States
- Location: 2.5 miles S of Fairview off US 74A, near Fairview, North Carolina
- Coordinates: 35°29′36″N 82°21′59″W
- Area: 20 acres (8.1 ha)
- Built: c. 1845
- NRHP reference No.: 75001244
- Added to NRHP: April 16, 1975

Sherrill's Inn is a historic home located near Fairview, Buncombe County, North Carolina. It is a four bay by two bay, log house of the saddle-bag variety which has been raised to two stories and weatherboarded. Attached to it is an originally separate two-story, log building, two bays wide and two bays deep. Also on the property are a contributing stone spring house and log meathouse. The building was built about 1845, and used as an inn throughout much of the 19th century.

It was listed on the National Register of Historic Places in 1975.
