= Dr. Cireo McAfee McCracken House =

Historic house in North Carolina, United States

- U.S. National Register of Historic Places
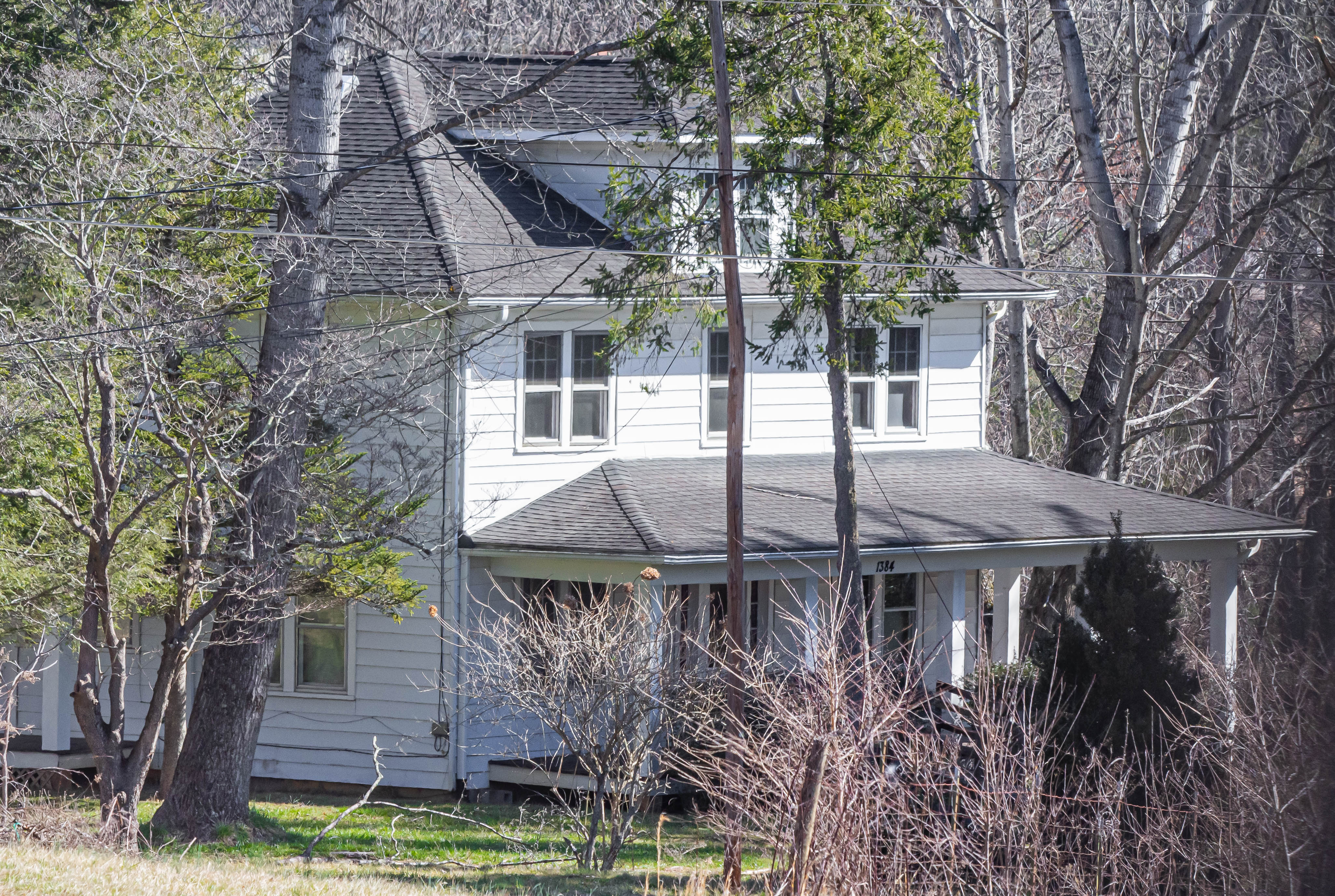

- Location within North Carolina Location within the United States
- Location: 1384 Charlotte Hwy., Fairview, North Carolina
- Coordinates: 35°31′28″N 82°24′34″W
- Area: 3 acres (1.2 ha)
- Built: 1924
- Built by: Oates, Bob, et al.
- Architectural style: Foursquare
- NRHP reference No.: 95001066
- Added to NRHP: September 1, 1995

Dr. Cireo McAfee McCracken House is a historic home located at Fairview, Buncombe County, North Carolina. It was built in 1924, and is a two-story, frame American Foursquare style dwelling. It has a low hipped roof and L-shaped front and rear porches. It was the residence of a long-time country doctor, who was in practice for 45 years.

It was listed on the National Register of Historic Places in 1995.
