= Fairview, Buncombe County, North Carolina =

Fairview, North Carolina
- Census-designated place
- Location in Buncombe County and the state of North Carolina
- Coordinates: 35°31′06″N 82°22′16″W
- Country: United States
- State: North Carolina
- County: Buncombe

Area
  - Total: 6.22 sq mi (16.12 km^{2})
  - Land: 6.22 sq mi (16.12 km^{2})
  - Water: 0 sq mi (0.00 km^{2})
- Elevation: 2,274 ft (693 m)

Population (2020)
  - Total: 2,771
  - Density: 445.2/sq mi (171.91/km^{2})
- Time zone: UTC-5 (Eastern (EST))
  - Summer (DST): UTC-4 (EDT)
- ZIP code: 28730
- FIPS code: 37-22440
- GNIS feature ID: 2402473

Fairview is a census-designated place (CDP) in Buncombe County, North Carolina, United States. The population was 2,678 at the 2010 census. It is part of the Asheville Metropolitan Statistical Area.

== History ==
The William Nelson Camp Jr. House, John A. Lanning House, Dr. Cireo McAfee McCracken House, and Sherrill's Inn are listed on the National Register of Historic Places.

Martin Gash bought 76 acres on Cripple Creek (later Gash's Creek) on November 27, 1793. Marshes which attracted buffalo had to be drained in order to use the land.

This area contains rich farm valleys and protective mountain walls, stewarded by the Cherokee people and other indigenous groups for 10,000 years or more before European settlers arrived in the late 18th century. As was the case with Martin Gash's land, many of the marshes were drained and the creeks were channeled to make farmland more usable for settler forms of agriculture and export of crops such as Tobacco.

== Geography ==
Fairview is located in southeastern Buncombe County along U.S. Route 74A (Charlotte Highway). It is 11 miles (18 km) southeast of downtown Asheville and 16 miles (26 km) northwest of Lake Lure.

According to the United States Census Bureau, the CDP has a total area of 6.2 square miles (16.1 km^{2}), all land.

== Demographics ==
Historical population
Census	Pop.	Note	%±
2020	2,771		—
U.S. Decennial Census

=== 2020 census ===
Fairview racial composition
Race	Number	Percentage
White (non-Hispanic)	2,461	88.81%
Black or African American (non-Hispanic)	53	1.91%
Native American	5	0.18%
Asian	18	0.65%
Pacific Islander	4	0.14%
Other/Mixed	135	4.87%
Hispanic or Latino	95	3.43%

As of the 2020 United States census, there were 2,771 people, 1,030 households, and 716 families residing in the CDP.

=== 2000 census ===
As of the census of 2000, there were 2,495 people, 907 households, and 684 families residing in the CDP. The population density was 401.6 inhabitants per square mile (155.1/km^{2}). There were 971 housing units at an average density of 156.3 per square mile (60.3/km^{2}). The racial makeup of the CDP was 97.15% White, 0.44% African American, 0.48% Native American, 0.52% Asian, 0.04% Pacific Islander, 0.16% from other races, and 1.20% from two or more races. Hispanic or Latino of any race were 0.52% of the population. 23.4% were of American, 11.1% English, 11.1% German, 10.9% Scotch-Irish, 8.6% Irish, 5.5% Polish, and 3.4% Albanian ancestry according to Census 2000. This makes Fairview the place in the United States with the largest concentration of Albanians.

There were 907 households, out of which 35.4% had children under the age of 18 living with them, 63.1% were married couples living together, 9.5% had a female householder with no husband present, and 24.5% were non-families. 20.4% of all households were made up of individuals, and 6.9% had someone living alone who was 65 years of age or older. The average household size was 2.61 and the average family size was 3.03.

In the CDP, the population was spread out, with 25.5% under the age of 18, 6.7% from 18 to 24, 27.7% from 25 to 44, 25.0% from 45 to 64, and 15.1% who were 65 years of age or older. The median age was 39 years. For every 100 females, there were 86.2 males. For every 100 females age 18 and over, there were 84.3 males.

The median income for a household in the CDP was $46,818, and the median income for a family was $51,768. Males had a median income of $31,615 versus $25,305 for females. The per capita income for the CDP was $21,029. About 8.1% of families and 9.5% of the population were below the poverty line, including 19.5% of those under age 18 and none of those age 65 or over.
