= Horse Island, New York =

Island in Lake Ontario, NY

Coordinates: 43°56′33″N 76°8′41″W

Horse island is a historical site recognized in many primary sourced letters and battle records. It is an egg-shaped island with an area of about 24 acres, located in Sackets Harbor on Lake Ontario in upstate New York. The island was the site of the Battle of Sacket's Harbor and has a notable lighthouse on it.

== The Battle of Sackets Harbor ==
The battle that took place on the island is the Battle of Sackets Harbor that happened in May 1813 that was a part of the War of 1812. When Britain and New America were fighting both sides built up their navies and raced to gain dominance over the Great Lakes region. Gaining control of the Great Lakes would be vital to winning the war. Gen. Sir George Prevost, Governor-General of Canada and representing Britain, planned to attack American troops on Horse Island. This island at the time was relatively untouched by humans and created a great vantage point on the nearby land controlled by America.

The Americans, under the leadership of Jacob Brown, anticipated the attack and had established a camp on Horse Island for the purpose of training new troops. When the anticipated attack came, it lasted for about three hours on Horse Island and the surrounding area. The Americans initially prevented the British from coming ashore but retreated to the mainland when the British succeeded in putting troops on Horse Island. The British were unable to pursue American forces because they could not scale the cliffs on the mainland. The British retreated from the shore at about nine in the morning when American forces began winning.

The people credited with directly defending Horse island are John Mills and his leading group of Albany volunteers that made up Camp Volunteer on the island.

== Horse Island lighthouse ==
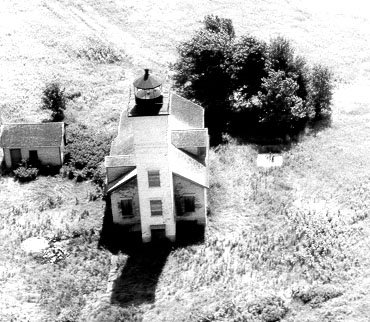
Sackettsharbor

Even though Sackets Harbor has been developed over the last 200 years, Horse Island remains relatively barren. In 1831, Congress allocated $4,000 to build a lighthouse on Horse Island. This was necessary because of the rocky area and the high cliff in the area. In both 1857 and 1870 funds were used to either renovate or rebuild the lighthouse on the island. The island is relatively off limits to the public, save for the battle field which is open year-round, so seeing the lighthouse may be difficult. Most visit the site by viewing the lighthouse from the main land battle site that sports a view of the lighthouse.

== Archeological findings ==
Another notable aspect of Horse island is that it is a destination for a variety of archeologists. Hartgen Archeological Associates, Inc. is one of the leaders of a new archeology group that set out to uncover different findings at Horse Island. The archeologists research the artifacts discovered on the island. Most of the artifacts are from the battle that occurred in 1813. With metal detectors and other instruments, archeologists have been able to research how the battle on the island happened in terms of potential skirmish lines and defensive positions.
