= William Nelson Camp Jr. House =

Historic house in North Carolina, United States

- U.S. National Register of Historic Places
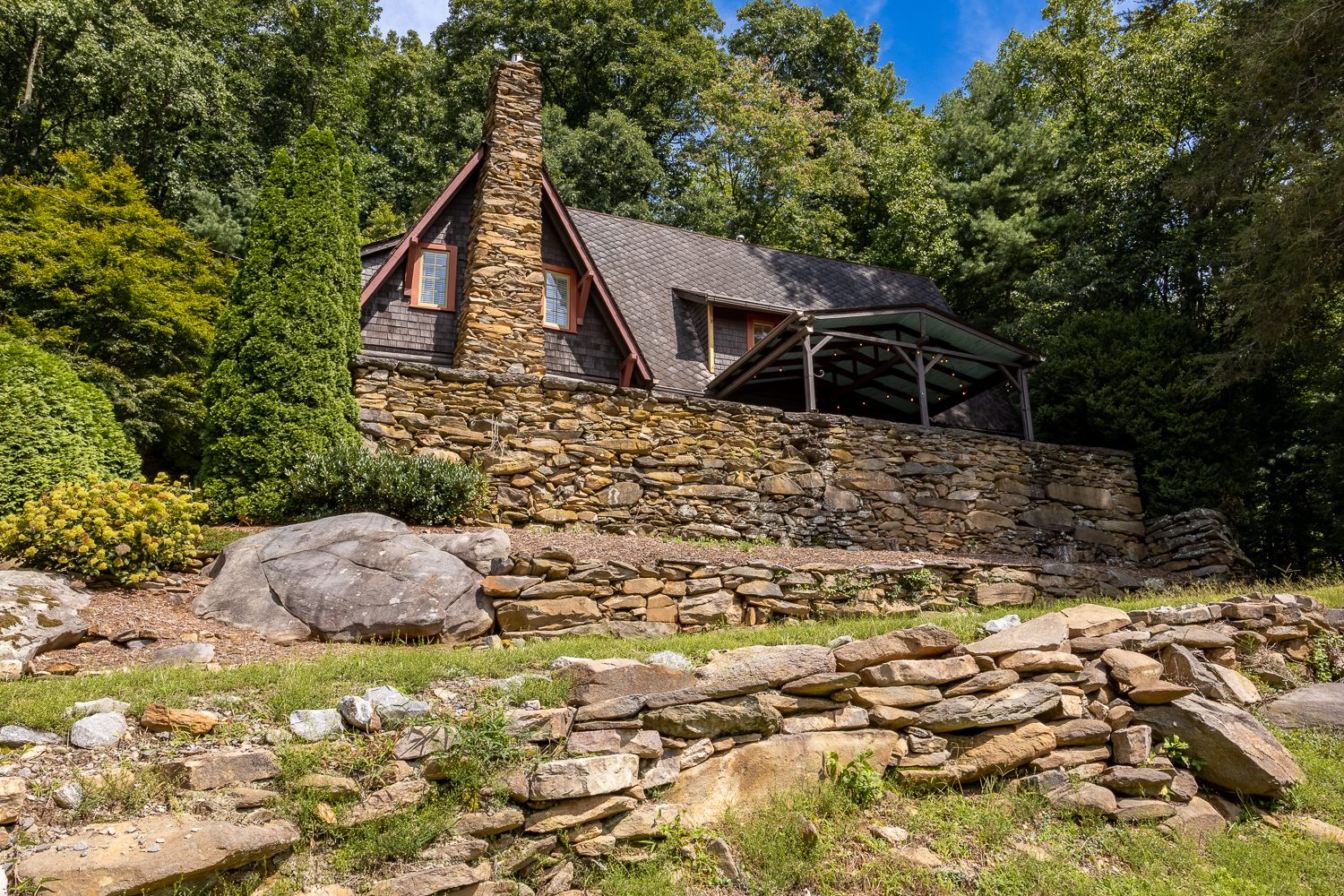
- William Nelson Camp Jr. House, 2024

- Location within North Carolina Location within the United States
- Location: 92 Flat Top Mountain Rd., Fairview, North Carolina
- Coordinates: 35.54947°N 82.39168°W
- Area: 10.8 acres (4.4 ha)
- Built: c. 1926
- Architectural style: Rustic
- NRHP reference No.: 98001530
- Added to NRHP: December 17, 1998

William Nelson Camp Jr. House is a historic home site located at Fairview, Buncombe County, North Carolina. The complex consists of Rustic-style buildings constructed with native materials built about 1926. The main house is a 1 1/2-story, six-bay, L-plan dwelling of log and frame construction. Related contributing buildings and structures include the carriage house, caretaker's cottage, two spring houses, and a barn. The William Nelson Camp Jr. house is the current location of Laurel Falls Weddings.

It was listed on the National Register of Historic Places in 1998.
