= Moses Camp House =

Historic house in Connecticut, United States

- U.S. National Register of Historic Places
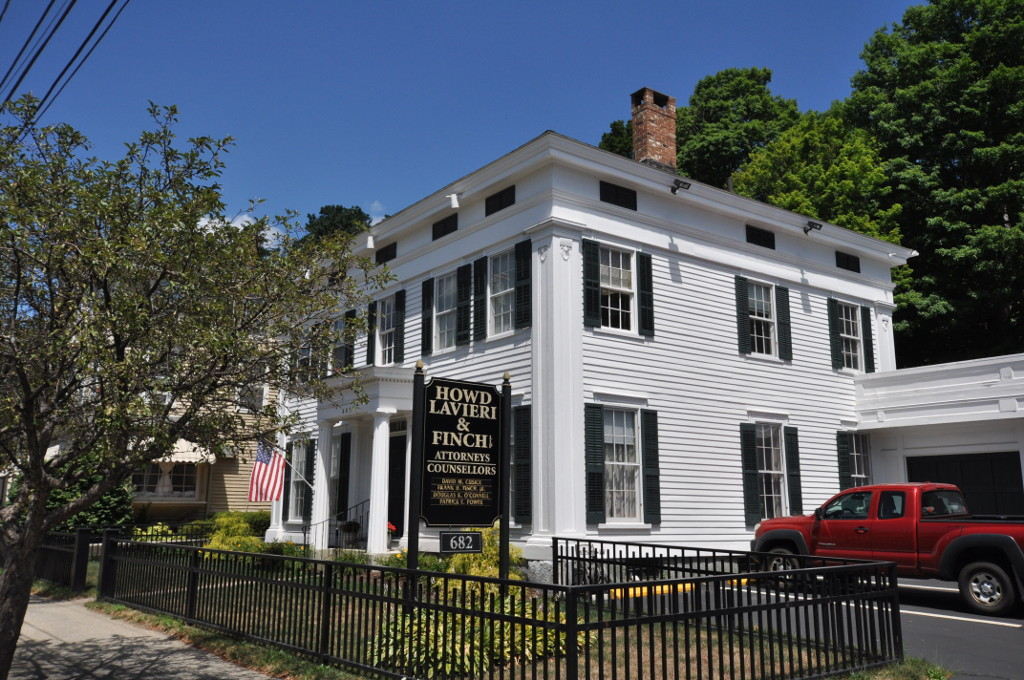

- Location within Connecticut Location within the United States
- Location: 682 Main Street, Winsted, Connecticut
- Coordinates: 41°55′27″N 73°4′33″W
- Area: less than one acre
- Built: 1840
- Architectural style: Greek Revival
- NRHP reference No.: 84001060
- Added to NRHP: May 10, 1984

The Moses Camp House is a historic house at 682 Main Street in the Winsted area of Winchester, Connecticut. Probably built about 1840 for one of the region's major merchants, it is a high quality example of Greek Revival architecture. It was listed on the National Register of Historic Places in 1984; it now houses professional offices.

== Description and history ==
The house stands on the east side of Main Street (United States Route 44) opposite its junction with Lake Street (Connecticut Route 263). It is a 2 1/2-story wood-frame structure, with a hip roof, clapboarded exterior, and granite foundation. Its main facade faces west, and is five bays wide. The main entrance is at the center, sheltered by a flat-roof portico with smooth Doric columns. The building corners have paneled pilasters, which rise to an entablature, above which are a band of small rectangular window at the attic level. The interior has a number of high-quality Greek Revival features, including fine woodwork in the central hallway. A number of features have been lost over time; historic photos of the house show it with a balustrade encircling the roof, and a widow's walk at the roof center.

The construction date of the house is somewhat uncertain. A house was built on this land in 1825 by Lucius Clarke, which was purchased by Moses Camp in 1840. It is unclear if the present house is a significant alteration to Clarke's house, or a new construction. Its stylistic features are consistent with an 1840 construction date, but it is also unique within the town as a Greek Revival house with a five-bay facade, an older feature. The house is framed with hand-hewn timbers. Moses Camp was a major economic force in the region, part-owning (along with two brothers) and operating one of the largest merchant business in Litchfield County. The Camps also built the Camp Block, Winsted's first brick commercial building (burned in 1889), and Moses Camp served as a bank president and in the state legislature. The house also had a prominent owner in the 20th century: C. Wensley Winslow served for as Winchester town clerk for more than 40 years.

== See also ==
- National Register of Historic Places listings in Litchfield County, Connecticut
