= Elisha Camp House =

Historic house in New York, United States

- U.S. National Register of Historic Places
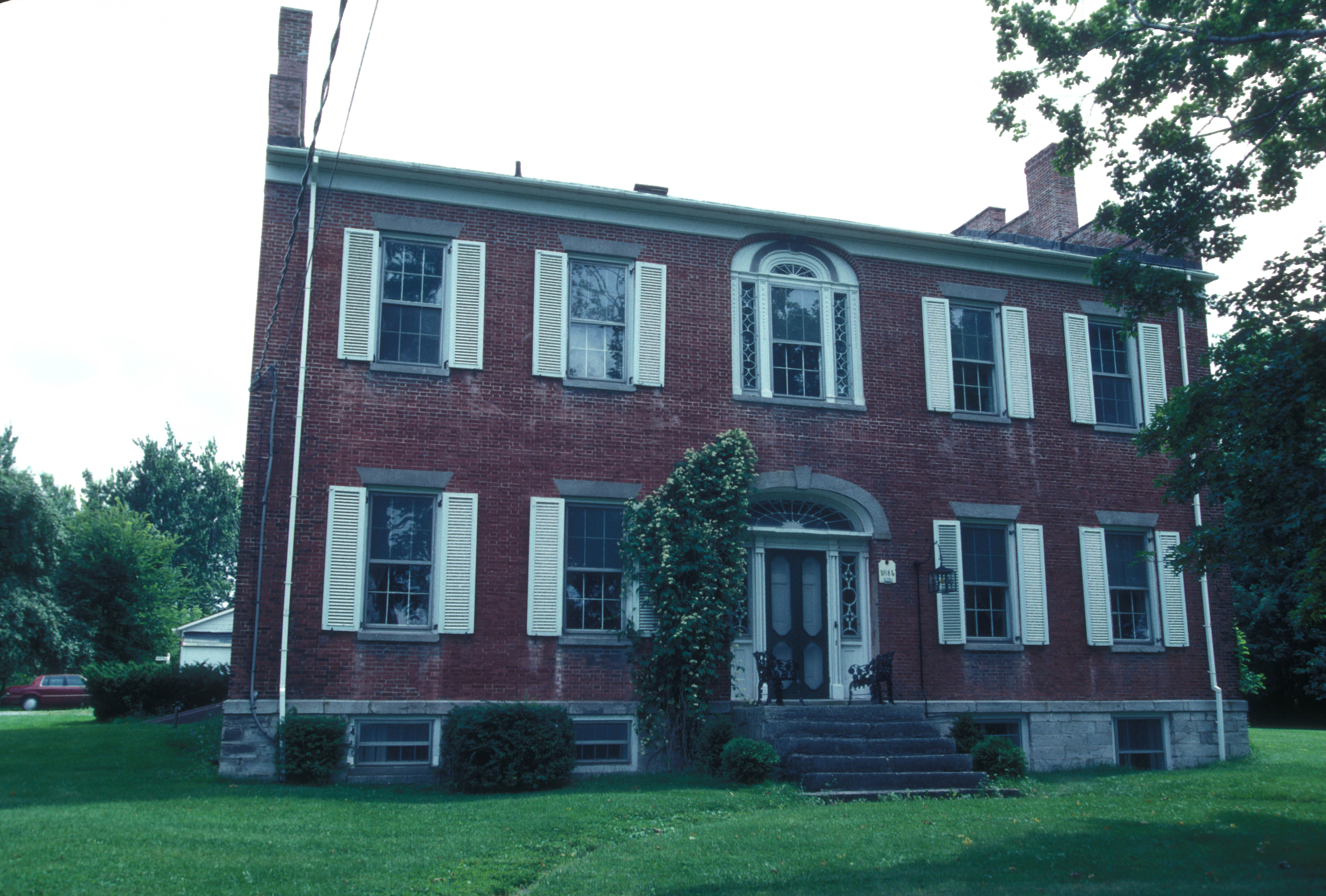

- Location within New York Location within the United States
- Location: 310 General Smith Dr., Sackets Harbor, New York
- Coordinates: 43°56′55″N 76°7′5″W
- Area: 7 acres (2.8 ha)
- Built: 1808
- Architect: Waterman, Barnabus
- Architectural style: Federal
- NRHP reference No.: 73001196
- Added to NRHP: April 23, 1973

Elisha Camp House is a historic home located at Sackets Harbor in Jefferson County, New York. It was built about 1808–1815 and is a 2 1/2-story red brick building that is a remarkably well preserved example of an elegant Federal-style dwelling. It features flat, geometric carving; Adamesque ornament; Palladian windows; elliptical fanlights; and a quality of reserve and refinement.

It was listed on the National Register of Historic Places in 1973.
