= Galloo Island =

Island in Jefferson County, New York, United States

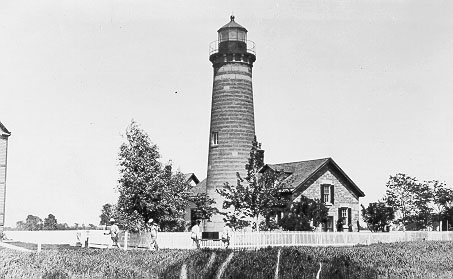
- The Galloo Island Light is listed on the National Register of Historic Places
- Interactive map of Galloo Island

Geography
- Location: Lake Ontario near Sackets Harbor, Jefferson County, New York
- Coordinates: 43.9056170°N 76.4163294°W
- Area: 3.46 sq mi (9.0 km^{2})
- Length: 4.5 mi (7.2 km)
- Width: 1.5 mi (2.4 km)
- Coastline: 10.0 mi (16.1 km)
- Highest elevation: 285 ft (86.9 m)

Administration
- United States

Galloo Island is located in eastern Lake Ontario near the entrance to Sackets Harbor in Jefferson County, New York, within the jurisdiction of the Town of Hounsfield.

== Geography ==
=== Location ===
Galloo Island is approximately 6 miles (9.7 km) from the New York mainland, and 5 miles (8.0 km) southeast of the international boundary with Canada. It is the most westerly of a group of four islands which includes Little Galloo Island, Calf Island, and Stony Island.

=== Natural features and wildlife ===
Galloo Island's shoreline is low and marshy, except on the northwest side where the island's forests abut Lake Ontario. The island has 10 miles (16 km) of shoreline, 3 miles (4.8 km) of which are cliffs of up to 65 feet (20 m) tall.

Wildlife on the island includes whitetail deer, fox, beaver, raccoon, pheasant, wild turkey, Canada goose, and various species of duck.

== History ==
Galloo Island was mentioned by several different names in historical atlases and correspondence including: Isle au Galots, Galop, Gallou, Galos, Gallop, Galloup, Gallup, Gallop, Gallow, and Galloo. In 1897, the name "Galloo Island" was selected, as it was the name used on a deed signed in 1819 by Governor DeWitt Clinton.

The Galloo Island Light was installed in 1820 on the western tip of the island. It has been automated since 1963, and is owned by the New York State Department of Environmental Conservation (NYSDEC).

There were cottages on the island during the early 1900s. The PK Club was located there, as was the Fortnightly Club Fishing Lodge, established by Robert Lansing, who served as U.S. Secretary of State from 1915 to 1920. The Galloo Island Coast Guard Station was erected on the east end of the island in 1936. It was abandoned in 1973, and is currently owned by the NYSDEC. There is also a small lookout tower owned by the U.S. Government located north of the former Coast Guard station.

The island has a grass airstrip, and a seven-bedroom guest lodge available for short-term rental.

=== Hounsfield Wind Farm ===
The Town of Hounsfield Planning Board received an application in 2007 from a private company, Upstate NY Power Corporation, to construct a wind farm on Galloo Island which would include the installation and operation of up to 84 wind turbines, as well as electrical lines, a docking facility, living quarters for employees, a helipad, parking areas, water and waste treatment facilities, and a batch plant for mixing concrete.

In 2011, the New York Power Authority would not enter into an agreement to purchase electricity from the proposed windfarm, and in 2013, the New York State Public Service Commission denied the company's application to construct a 50.6 mi (81.4 km) electrical transmission line to a substation in the Town of Mexico.
