= Main Duck Island =

Island in Ontario, Canada

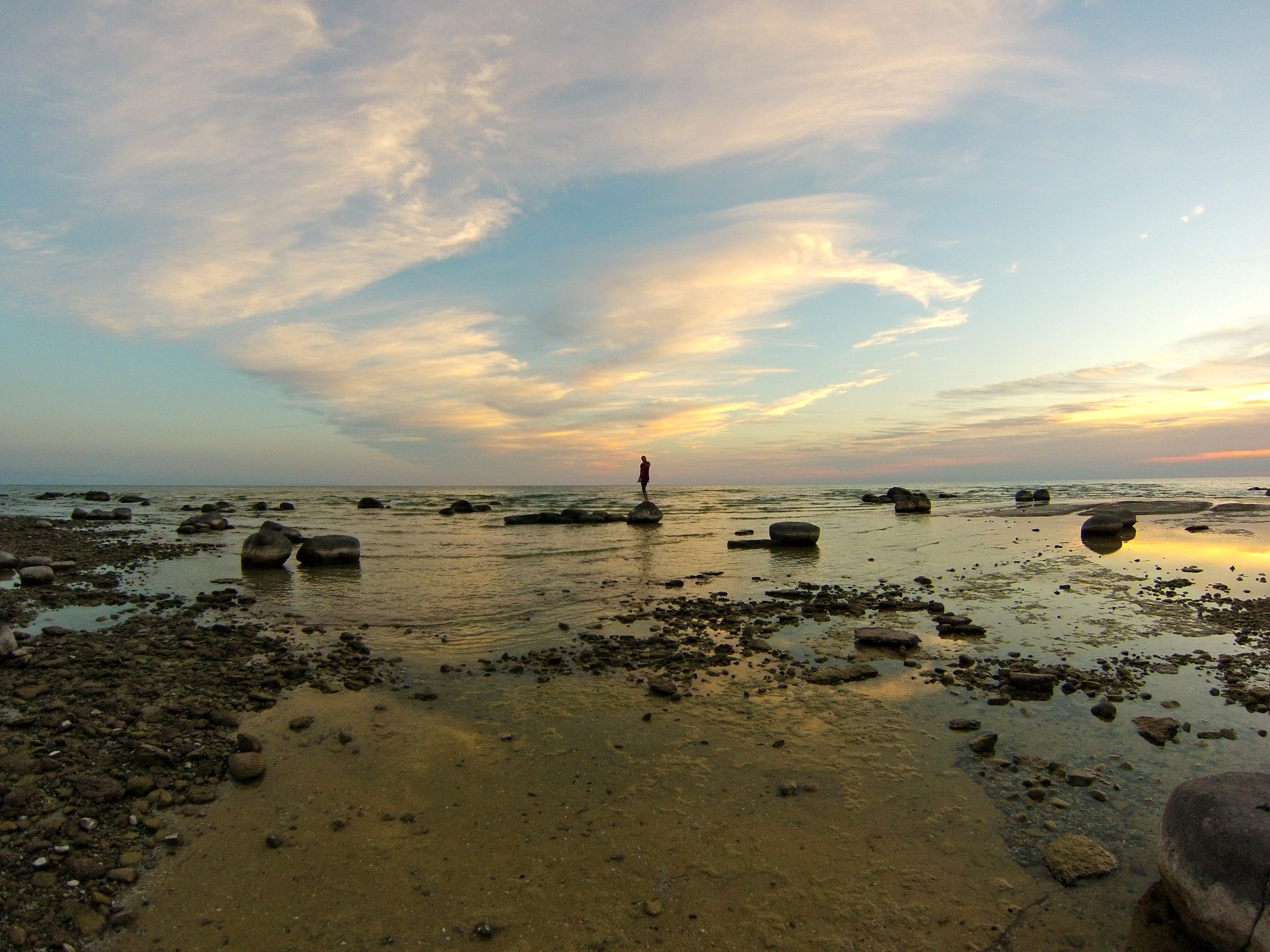
- Interactive map of Main Duck Island

Geography
- Location: Lake Ontario
- Coordinates: 43°55′34″N 76°37′10″W
- Total islands: 2
- Major islands: Main Duck Island

Administration
- Canada
- Province: Ontario

Demographics
- Population: 0 (1978)

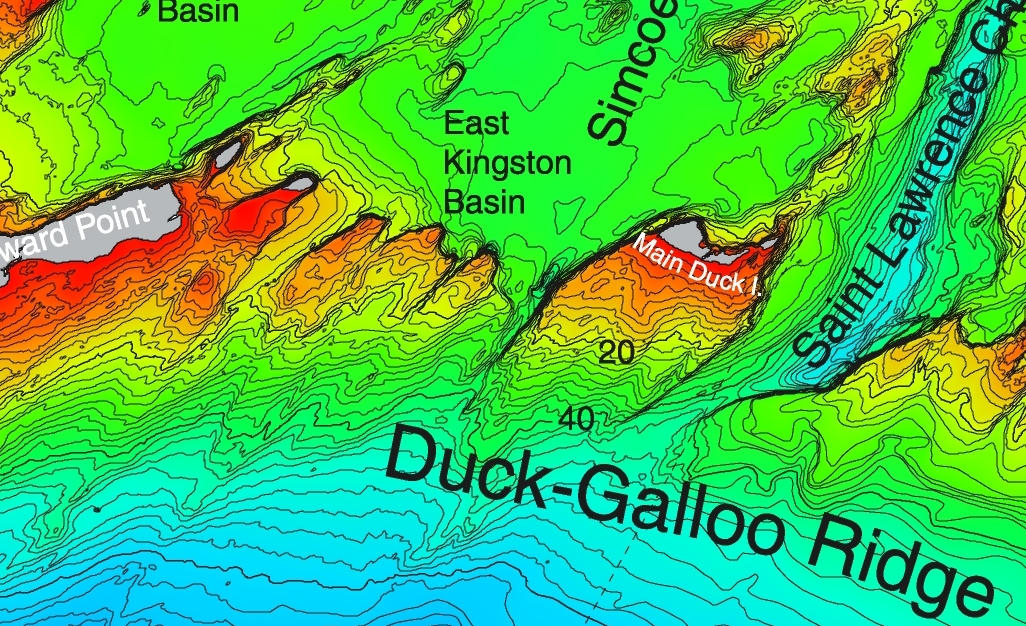
Main Duck Island and some other islands and shoals in the Duck Galloo Ridge.

Main Duck Island is a Canadian island in the eastern part of Lake Ontario situated next to the smaller Yorkshire Island. It was purchased by Parks Canada in 1977 and has been administered as part of the Thousand Islands National Park since 1998, even though it is not part of the Thousand Islands region.

The island is 20 kilometres from the closest mainland. Its area is 230 hectares (570 acres).

== History ==
=== Early history ===
Archaeological evidence suggests the island was first used by nomadic Point Peninsula peoples between 450 BC and 450 AD. The island then appears to have been used by the Owasco culture from 850 to 1050 AD. There is evidence that Iroquoian peoples used the island from 1250 to 1450 AD.

=== European settlement ===
European settlers from Prince Edward County began to settle Main Duck Island in the early 19th century, establishing a fishing station.

Captain John Walters built a schooner there in 1865 called the Harriet Anne.

=== 20th century ===
In 1904 the Government of Canada sold the island to Claude W. Cole from Cape Vincent, New York. Cole was, originally, an impresario in the fishing industry. When the prohibition of alcoholic beverages came into effect, in 1917, Cole became a notorious smuggler, with commercial fishermen who rented huts` on the island, during fishing season, smuggling booze with their catches.

A seasonal fishing village of 60 residents existed in the early part of the century. In 1941, John Foster Dulles, the future secretary of state for Dwight D. Eisenhower, bought much of the island as a summer place. After his death in 1959, his friend Robert F. Hart Jr. inherited his land on the island. The Nature Conservancy of Canada purchased this land circa 1976 and then resold it to the Canadian Federal Government. In 1998 it was included in the Thousand Islands National Park of Canada.

Many vessels were wrecked on shoals near the island.

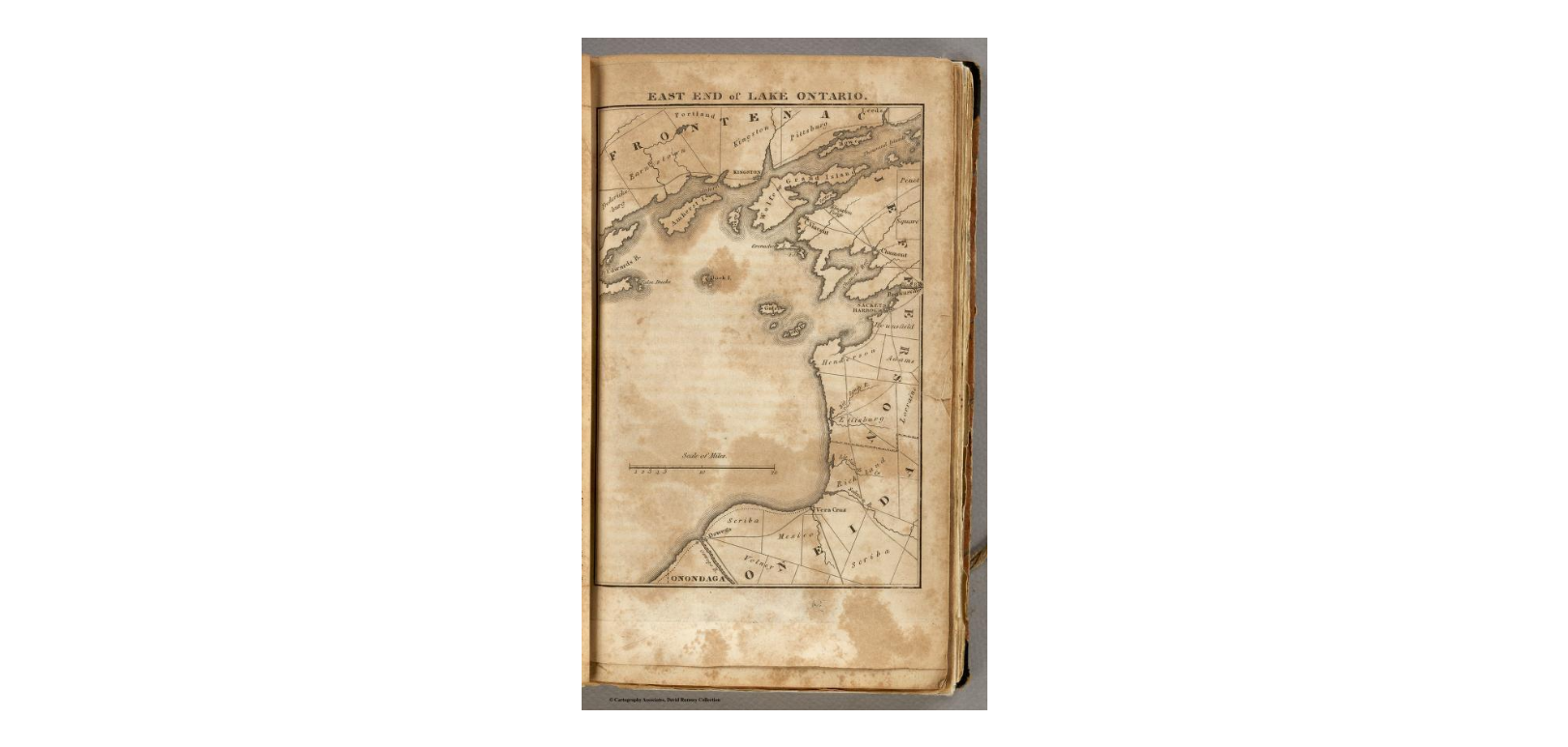
East End of Lake Ontario (1815)

== Buildings ==
Besides the lighthouse (c. 1914), a few buildings exists on the island:

- lighthouse keeper home
- assistant lightkeeper home c. 1970s
- schoolhouse
- ruins of the Foster estate (chimney remains)

In the middle of the larger island is a dock servicing small vessels. There are no roads on the island and just foot trails.

== Lighthouse keepers ==
- James Clark (1914 – 1915)
- Fred Bongard (1915 – 1921)
- Wesley Earl Thomas (1921 – 1953)
- Harold Dunn (1954 – 1958)
- Coleman Main (1959 – 1976)
- Kenneth McConnell (1976 – 1978)
- Don Holdaway (- 1986)

== See also ==
- Pigeon Island
