= Sackets Harbor, New York =

- Village
- Location within New York Location within the United States
- Coordinates: 43°57′N 76°7′W
- Country: United States
- State: New York
- County: Jefferson
- Town: Hounsfield

Government
  - Mayor: Alex Morgia

Area
  - Total: 2.31 sq mi (5.99 km^{2})
  - Land: 2.31 sq mi (5.97 km^{2})
  - Water: 0.0039 sq mi (0.01 km^{2})
- Elevation: 282 ft (86 m)

Population (2020)
  - Total: 1,351
  - Density: 585.9/sq mi (226.23/km^{2})
- Time zone: UTC-5 (Eastern (EST))
  - Summer (DST): UTC-4 (EDT)
- ZIP code: 13685
- Area code: 315
- FIPS code: 36-64408
- GNIS feature ID: 0963166
- Website: sacketsharbor-ny.gov

Sackets Harbor (earlier spelled Sacketts Harbor) is a village in Jefferson County, New York, United States, on Lake Ontario. As of the 2020 census, Sackets Harbor had a population of 1,351. The village was named after land developer and owner Augustus Sackett, who founded it in the early 1800s.

Sackets Harbor is in the western part of the town of Hounsfield and is west of Watertown. The heart of the village, with a Main Street and well-preserved 19th century buildings, has been recognized as the Sackets Harbor Village Historic District and listed on the National Register of Historic Places in 1983.

To support the War of 1812, the US Navy built a major shipyard and its headquarters for the Great Lakes at the village. Within a short period, more than 3,000 men worked at the shipyard. The Army constructed earthworks, forts, barracks and supporting infrastructure to defend the village and navy shipyard, and its troops also camped in the village. The thousands of military personnel made it seem like a city. By the fall of 1814, this was the third-largest population center in the entire state, after Albany and New York City. With its strategic protected harbor on Lake Ontario and military installations, the village had national importance through the 19th century.

Soon after the war, the Army strengthened its defenses on the northern frontier by constructing Madison Barracks. The village also developed a commercial shipyard and many business connections to communities around the Great Lakes. Its businessmen were also connected to bases in the major markets of Louisville, Kentucky, and New Orleans. In 1817 a consortium of local businessmen supported construction of the 240-ton Ontario, the first US steamboat on the Great Lakes. In July 1834, the commercial schooner Illinois from Sackets Harbor was the first to enter the harbor of the new settlement of Chicago. Sackets Harbor Battlefield State Historic Site commemorates a battle during the War of 1812 and the contribution of the area to the United States defense.

== History ==
Prior to the American Revolutionary War, this area had been inhabited for thousands of years by differing cultures of indigenous peoples. The historic tribe were the Iroquoian-speaking Onondaga, part of the Haudenosaunee, or Iroquois Confederacy. Long trading with the French and English, the Mohawk and most of the Six Nations allied with the British during the Revolution, hoping to dislodge the American colonists from their territory. Following the war, they were forced to make major cessions of most of their land in New York to the United States. Most of the Iroquois went to Canada and settled on land granted by Great Britain.

In the large-scale sales of 5 million acres (20,000 km^{2}) of public lands in the postwar period, Sackets Harbor was founded in 1801 by Augustus Sackett, a land speculator from New York City. He and others had high hopes for trade across Lake Ontario with Kingston and other parts of Canada. With one of the few natural harbors on Lake Ontario, Sackets Harbor was the most significant community in the area until the founding of the city of Watertown.

The area attracted migrants from New England, as well as immigrants from Great Britain and France. The latter were fleeing the turmoil of the French Revolution and the Napoleonic Wars. They cleared heavy forest and gradually constructed houses for a village center. Edmund Luff, a young English immigrant, constructed a non-denominational meetinghouse, where all Christians met until they built their own churches in later decades. Converted to a residence, the house still stands.

The American Revolution did not resolve all issues with Great Britain. Border issues and increasing tensions led the US to impose the Embargo Act of 1807 prohibiting trade with Great Britain, which effectively included Canada. People on both sides of the border, Canadian (many of them Native Americans, including Loyalists who had fled there after the Revolution) and American, quickly built up a vigorous smuggling trade across the waters and through the nearby Thousand Islands area along the St. Lawrence River. But the embargo reduced trade. The US government first stationed forces in the area to try to reduce smuggling.

By the 1810 census, there were 943 qualified voters in the village. Sackets Harbor incorporated as a village in 1814, during the War of 1812.

=== War of 1812 ===
As tensions increased with Great Britain, the US began to build up its military forces at Sackets Harbor, including creating a major shipyard at what became Navy Point. The scale of buildup was such that the citizens were outnumbered on a scale of about 8:1 by thousands of sailors and soldiers, camp followers and traders. Some 3,000 workers built the warships, and most had been recruited from the New York City area.

Limited sanitary facilities and medical knowledge made the dense troop encampments breeding grounds for infectious diseases, such as typhus, which quickly spread to villagers, too. By February 1813, Sackets Harbor was the largest community in the state north of the Mohawk River.

The village was the site of two battles during the War of 1812. In the first battle in 1812, the brig USS Oneida and shore batteries repulsed an attacking force of five British ships. The village became a major base of operations for both the Navy (including US Marine Corps) and Army for the duration of the war. The Army built defensive earthworks around much of the village, and Fort Tompkins with barracks near Navy Point. Local militia built Fort Volunteer north of the village main streets. Thousands of troops gathered to defend the shipyard and village, and to attack Canada.

The numbers of troops so exceeded what could be built to shelter them that in 1813 troops were housed with residents, in stores, in barns and in tents. Village women counted themselves lucky if they were only cooking for officers. By the spring of 1813, the Army had gathered approximately 5,200 men in the village.

Most importantly, by 1813 the village became the US Naval Headquarters on the Great Lakes. Working at the Navy Point shipyard were 3,000 highly skilled men, including hundreds of shipbuilders and carpenters brought from New York City because of a lack of locally skilled craftsmen. The yard was constructed and supervised during the war by New York City naval architect and shipbuilder Henry Eckford. They rapidly built eleven warships to establish control over the Great Lakes.

Control of the Great Lakes ultimately ended up in the hands of both the peoples of Canada and the United States (with the exception of Lake Michigan, which is located entirely within the United States) and has been managed since 1909 by the International Joint Commission.

In the Second Battle of Sacket's Harbor in May 1813, British forces landed and attacked the village, but they were again driven off. Most of the American garrison and ships were at the western end of the lake at the time in another conflict. The American defense was marred by officers' mistaken orders at Navy Point to destroy stores and a partially constructed ship, to prevent capture by the British.

The buildup continued. In the fall of 1813, the Navy had moved its hospital off a ship and was temporarily renting the non-denominational meeting house from settler and preacher Edmund Luff. The next year a two-story hospital was constructed on land just north of the village and south of Mill Creek, on land that was bought from his father Samuel Luff. By the fall of 1814, Sackets Harbor was the third-largest population center in all of New York state, after Albany and New York City.

Until the federal government established the U.S. Naval Academy in Annapolis, Maryland, it had several schools for the training of midshipmen. Commodore Isaac Chauncey, writing to the Secretary of the Navy on November 30, 1814, described a school established at Sacket's Harbor on Lake Ontario in that year:

Sir. I have the pleasure to inform you that I have established a Mathematical School under the direction of my Chaplain the Revd. Mr. Felch who is fully competent to the duties of such a School. More than One hundred Officers attend this School, as they can be spared from duty and about Sixty Lieutenants and Midshipmen attend daily who make great progress in the various branches of Mathematics Navigation. etc.

The end of the war came in 1815 before the Navy completed construction of the last warship, the USS New Orleans. She was put into storage and never completed. She was finally scrapped in 1883.

=== 19th through 20th centuries ===
The military recognized the continued importance of Sackets Harbor's strategic location. The Navy Shipyard operated until 1874, building ships such as USRC Active (1843), a revenue cutter. In 1848 a new Sackets Harbor Naval Station was constructed. After 1884, the base was used mostly for training.

The Army took over privately owned land of Samuel Luff just north of the village to build Madison Barracks (c. 1814–1819). Well into the late 19th century, this was a substantial military installation; the Army added new construction including housing, a school, a hospital, stables for horses, and supporting infrastructure. Ulysses S. Grant was among the officers who served here. During World War I, the base was used primarily as a hospital post, and in World War II as a training post.

Madison Barracks has been designated as an Historic District and listed on the National Register of Historic Places. The New York State Museum of Military History calls it "a living museum of military architecture". Comprising the northeastern quarter of the village, the Madison Barracks is being slowly redeveloped as a planned commercial/residential area. The New York City consortium Fort Pike Associates holds title to unsold land in the complex.

In July 2017, the 24-acre (9.7 ha) Horse Island, located just west of the village, was acquired for preservation by the Civil War Trust, aided by a grant from the National Park Service. It was the site of a War of 1812 engagement. This was the first time in the US that a grant from the American Battlefield Land Grant program has been used to preserve a War of 1812 site.

Sackets Harbor developed as an important Great Lakes port through most of the 19th century. Commercial shipyards were built that adjoined Navy Point. In 1817 a local consortium of military officers and businessmen—General Jacob Brown, Commodore Melancthon Taylor Woolsey, Charles Smyth, Eric Lusher, Elisha Camp, Samuel F. Hooker, and Hunter Crane—financed the construction of the 240-ton Ontario. It was the first US steamboat to be built west of the Hudson River and operated on the Great Lakes. This was the beginning of extensive steamboat traffic on the Great Lakes, including passenger boats that stopped at towns around the lakes.

On July 12, 1834, Louis Hooker, a son of Samuel Hooker, was aboard the schooner Illinois from Sackets Harbor when it was the first commercial ship to enter Chicago harbor, a sign of what was soon to be greatly increased Great Lakes trade with that city and region. Samuel F. Hooker and his sons had shipping interests in Sackets Harbor with national networks; their firm had steamboats based in Louisville, Kentucky. These were part of the Mississippi River trade to and from New Orleans, a major port and one of the wealthiest cities in the nation before the American Civil War. Thus Hooker and similar upstate New York businessmen gained some of their wealth from the domestic slave trade, as Louisville was a major shipping point for slaves sold to New Orleans markets and the Deep South.

As cities industrialized and major economic development moved West, from 1870 to 1930 the village became a popular destination for families taking lengthy summer vacations. It attracted visitors from Chicago and other major cities around the Great Lakes, many of whom had family who had lived in Sackets Harbor before the mid-19th century westward migration. Some maintained second homes in historic properties of the village.

In the early 21st century, heritage tourism and summer recreation have been renewed sources of growth for the village. Navy Point is a marina providing moorings and facilities for private boats.

The Elisha Camp House, Galloo Island Light, Madison Barracks, Sackets Harbor Battlefield, Sackets Harbor Village Historic District, and Union Hotel are listed on the National Register of Historic Places.

=== Notable people ===
- Frances Bible, opera singer
- American military officer and explorer Zebulon Pike was buried in Sackets Harbor after his death in combat at the Battle of York in 1813. His remains were interred with honors at the military cemetery on Dodge Avenue. A namesake warship, USS General Pike, was built and launched at Sackets Harbor before the end of that year.
- Brigadier General and former U.S. Representative from Maryland Leonard Covington, who also perished in 1813, at the Battle of Crysler's Farm.
- Colonel Elisha Camp founded and built historic Camp Manor in 1811. He also served the US Army in the War of 1812 as one of its Quartermasters under General Jacob Brown.
- Simon Bolivar Buckner served at Sackets Harbor from 1844 until 1845
- President Ulysses S. Grant served two tours of duty at Madison Barracks in Sackets Harbor as a junior army officer.
- General Mark Wayne Clark was born at the Madison Barracks.
- Bartender Jerry Thomas, considered "the father of American mixology," was born in Sackets Harbor in 1830.
- Wisconsin State Assemblyman and Senator Hobart Sterling Sacket was born in Sackets Harbor in 1844.
- Wisconsin State Assemblyman Samuel Ryan, Jr., was born in Sackets Harbor in 1824.
- Martha Foote Crow, writer, literary scholar and pioneer in women's higher education in the United States, was born in Sackets Harbor in 1854.

=== Additional facts ===
- Company B of the United States Regiment of Dragoons, which is today 2nd Squadron, 1st Cavalry Regiment, was organized at Sackets Harbor on July 29, 1833. It moved west to join the rest of the regiment at Jefferson Barracks, Lemay, Missouri, arriving September 6, 1833.
- The World War II tanker, the SS Sackets Harbor, was named after the village.
- Sackets Harbor is the hometown of "Funny Cide", the famous gelding owned by Sackatoga Stable. In 2003 he won the Kentucky Derby and the Preakness Stakes, making him a contender for the Triple Crown, but lost the Belmont.
- The village is the setting for American Girl's Caroline Abbott doll, introduced in 2013, and her stories, which are set during the War of 1812.

== Geography ==
Sackets Harbor is located at 43°56′47″N 76°7′4″W (43.946503, −76.117758).

According to the United States Census Bureau, the village has a total area of 2.2 square miles (5.7 km^{2}), of which 0.004 square miles (0.01 km^{2}), or 0.26%, are water. The village is on Black River Bay, southwest of the mouth of the Black River, on Lake Ontario. Its protected harbor was critical to the founding and early history of the village. Much of Lake Ontario was gouged out of rock by glaciers. There were few protected harbors on the south shore deep enough for major shipping in the early 19th century.

New York State Route 3 passes east of the village, which is at the convergence of County Roads 62 (Sulphur Springs Road) and 75 (Adams Road/Dodge Avenue). Watertown, the Jefferson county seat, is 10 miles (16 km) to the east, and Henderson Harbor is 9 miles (14 km) to the southwest.

== Demographics ==
Historical population
Census	Pop.	Note	%±
1870	713		—
1880	885		24.1%
1890	787		−11.1%
1900	1,266		60.9%
1910	868		−31.4%
1920	667		−23.2%
1930	1,680		151.9%
1940	1,962		16.8%
1950	1,247		−36.4%
1960	1,279		2.6%
1970	1,202		−6.0%
1980	1,017		−15.4%
1990	1,313		29.1%
2000	1,386		5.6%
2010	1,450		4.6%
2020	1,351		−6.8%
U.S. Decennial Census

As of the census of 2000, there were 1,386 people, 653 households, and 370 families residing in the village. The population density was 609.1 inhabitants per square mile (235.2/km^{2}). There were 791 housing units at an average density of 347.6 per square mile (134.2/km^{2}). The racial makeup of the village was 97.26% White, 0.43% African American, 0.29% Native American, 0.29% Asian, 0.36% from other races, and 1.37% from two or more races. Hispanic or Latino of any race were 1.73% of the population.

There were 653 households, out of which 23.1% had children under the age of 18 living with them, 45.2% were married couples living together, 8.4% had a female householder with no husband present, and 43.3% were non-families. 35.1% of all households were made up of individuals, and 9.0% had someone living alone who was 65 years of age or older. The average household size was 2.11 and the average family size was 2.72.

In the village, the population was spread out, with 18.8% under the age of 18, 11.0% from 18 to 24, 37.7% from 25 to 44, 21.7% from 45 to 64, and 10.9% who were 65 years of age or older. The median age was 34 years. For every 100 females, there were 113.6 males. For every 100 females age 18 and over, there were 113.3 males.

The median income for a household in the village was $42,629, and the median income for a family was $51,397. Males had a median income of $33,696 versus $26,917 for females. The per capita income for the village was $23,269. About 5.8% of families and 7.8% of the population were below the poverty line, including 10.9% of those under age 18 and 7.7% of those age 65 or over.

== Education ==
Sackets Harbor Central School District provides public education in the area, and operates a high school and elementary school.
