= Stony Island (New York) =

Island in New York, United States

Coordinates: 43.894°N 76.331°W

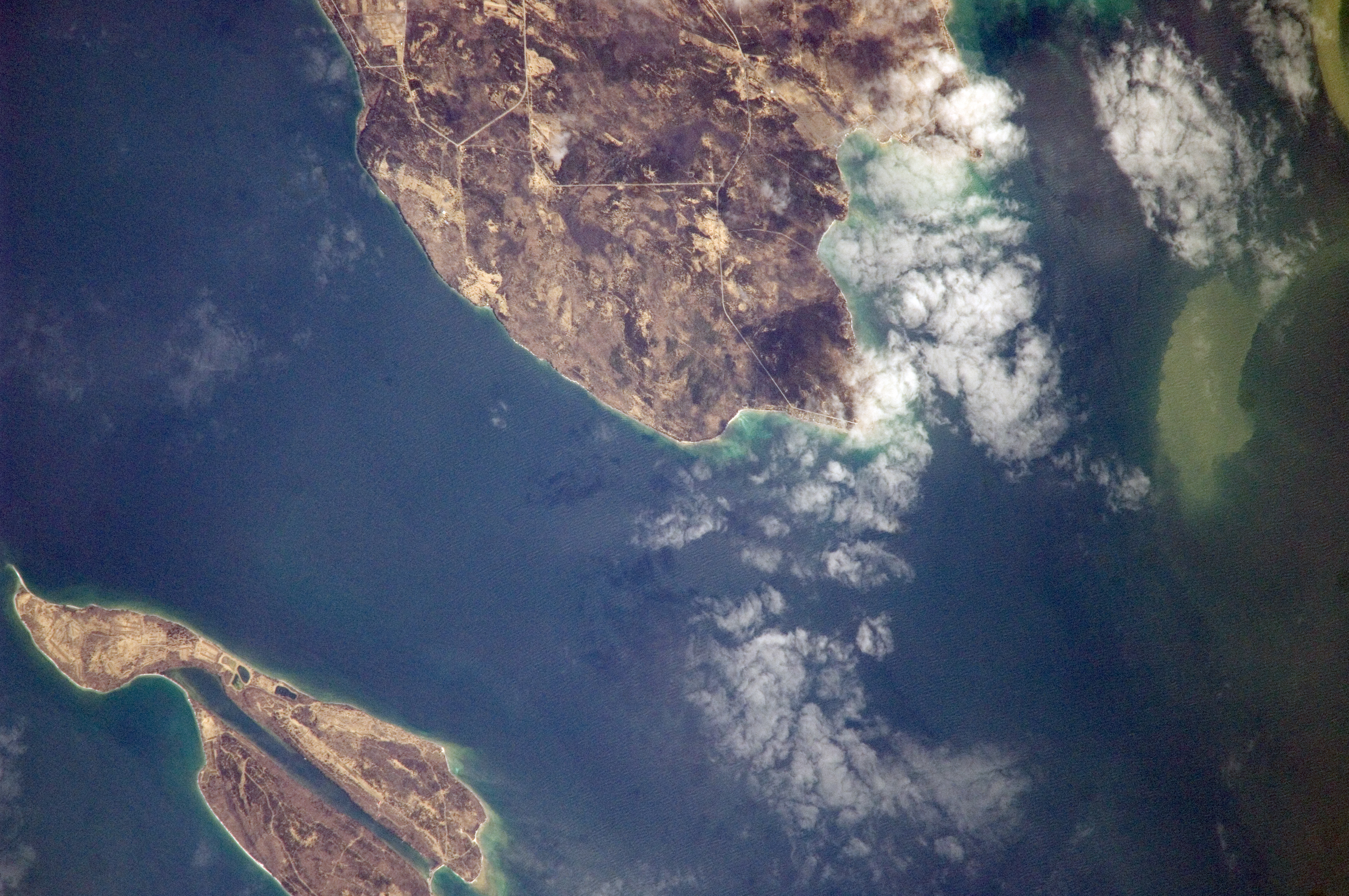

Stony Island is an island in the eastern end of Lake Ontario. It is located in Jefferson County, New York. The island covers 1,536 acres (6.22 km^{2}).

Originally, the island was covered by large cedar trees. It was cleared for farming in the 19th century but is now largely wooded again. Most of its land area is currently owned or leased by the Phillips 66 Company (formerly Phillips Petroleum Company).
