= 2018 Essex County municipal elections =

Local election in Ontario, Canada

Municipal elections were held in Essex County in Ontario on October 22, 2018, in conjunction with municipal elections across the province.

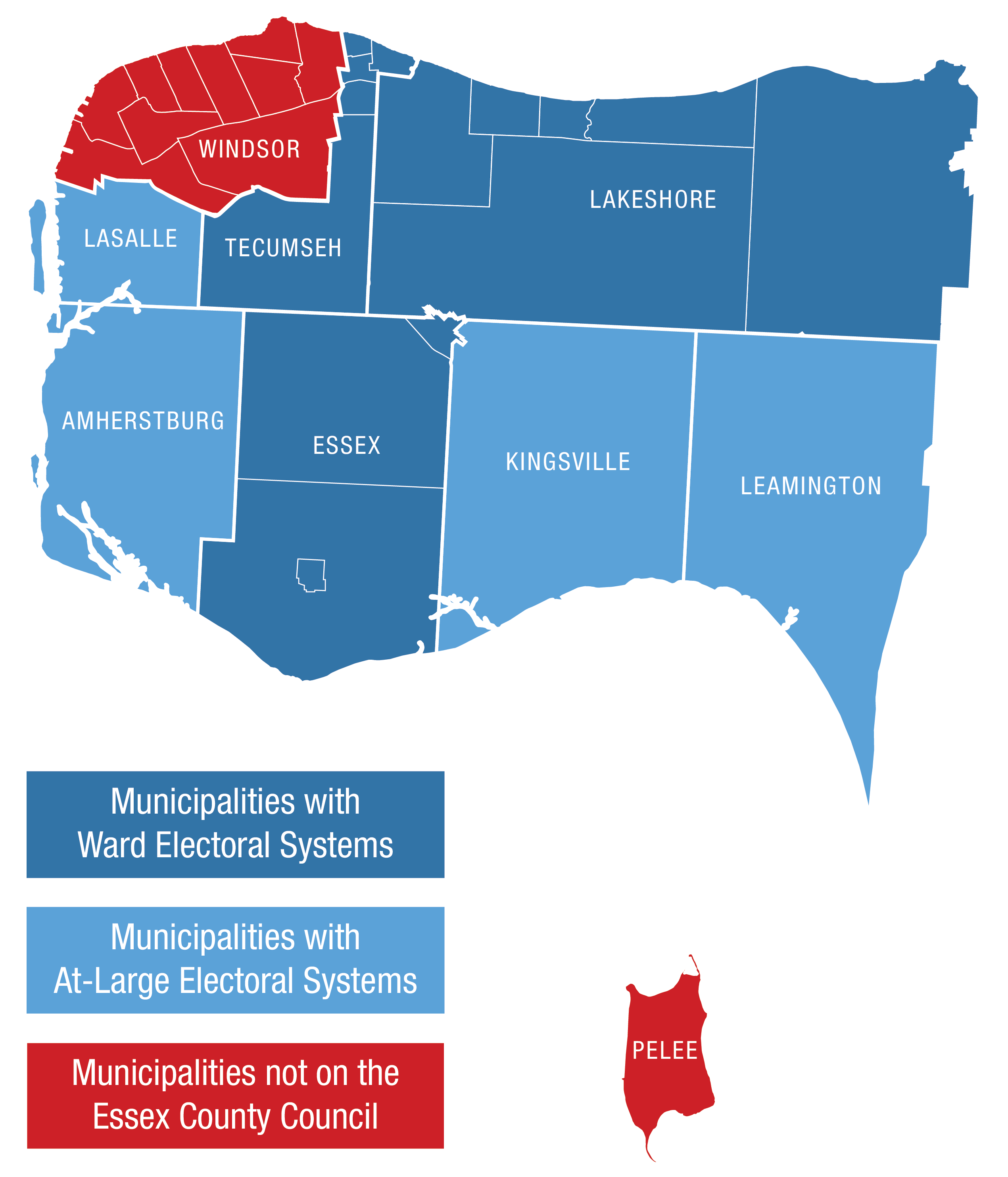
Map of Essex County showing the municipalities that use a Ward system for their Town Councils in Dark Blue, and an At-Large system (with the top 5 placed candidates elected) in Light Blue. Red is Windsor and Pelee which are both part of Essex County, but are considered separate municipalities, and do not send members to the Essex County Council.

This page only includes the results for the towns of Essex County, and Pelee. While the City of Windsor (the largest population centre in the county by far) is nominally part of the county and counted in its population numbers, the city and its municipal government are a separate entity, and does not send any members to the County Council. The elections to Windsor's Mayor and City Council were held concurrently.

(NOTE: Elected candidates are shown in bold. An (X) indicates an incumbent candidate.)

== Essex County Council ==
Essex County Council consists of the 7 mainland mayors of Essex County and their seven deputy mayors.

Position	Elected
Amherstburg Mayor	Aldo DiCarlo
Amherstburg Deputy Mayor	Leo Meloche
Essex Mayor	Larry Snively
Essex Deputy Mayor	Richard Meloche
Kingsville Mayor	Nelson Santos (acclaimed)
Kingsville Deputy Mayor	Gord Queen (acclaimed)
Lakeshore Mayor	Tom Bain (acclaimed)
Lakeshore Deputy Mayor	Tracey Bailey
LaSalle Mayor	Marc A. Bondy
LaSalle Deputy Mayor	Crystal Meloche (acclaimed)
Leamington Mayor	Hilda Macdonald
Leamington Deputy Mayor	Larry Verbeke
Tecumseh Mayor	Gary McNamara (acclaimed)
Tecumseh Deputy Mayor	Joe Bachetti

== Amherstburg ==
The following are the results for Mayor, Deputy Mayor, & the Municipal Council of Amherstburg.

=== Mayor ===
Mayoral Candidate	Vote	%
**Aldo DiCarlo (X)**	**4,576**	**62.67**
Glenn Swinton	2,726	37.33

=== Deputy Mayor ===
Deputy Mayoral Candidate	Vote	%
**Leo Meloche**	**2,579**	
Diane Pouget	2,575	
Bob Rozankovic	1,142	
Richard Fryer	948	

== Essex ==
=== Mayor ===
Mayoral Candidate	Vote	%
**Larry Snively**	**2,261**	**32.84**
Ron Rogers	2,144	31.14
Katie McGuire-Blais	1,358	19.72
Rob Shepley	1,122	16.30

== Kingsville ==
=== Mayor ===
Mayoral Candidate	Vote	%
**Nelson Santos** (X)	**Acclaimed**	

== Lakeshore ==
=== Mayor ===
Mayoral Candidate	Vote	%
**Tom Bain** (X)	**Acclaimed**	

=== Deputy Mayor ===
Deputy Mayoral Candidate	Vote	%
**Tracey Bailey**	**7,858**	**68.85**
Al Fazio (X)	2,541	22.26
Sean Gabriele	1,015	8.89

The results for Lakeshore Town Council is as follows:

=== Town Council ===
Candidate	Vote	%
Ward 1
**Steven Wilder** (X)	**1,245**	**70.78**
John-Mark Jurak	514	29.22
Ward 2
**Len Janisse** (X)	**654**	**47.53**
Samantha Russell	394	28.63
Lana Drouillard	328	23.84
Ward 3
**Kelsey Santarossa**	**716**	**41.29**
Steve Colasanti	517	29.82
Ray Holland	360	20.76
Kevin St-Pierre	141	8.13
Ward 4
**John Kerr**	**674**	**24.22**
Romeo Beaulieu	589	21.16
Jennifer-Jane Poisson	495	17.79
Steven Bezaire	420	15.09
Paddy Byrne	304	10.92
Susan Dozois	301	10.82
Ward 5
**Kirk Walstedt**	**1,254**	**57.50**
Dan Diemer (X)	428	19.62
Tim McDermott	424	19.44
Rolf Keller	53	2.43
Wayne Rose	22	1.01
Ward 6
**Linda McKinlay** (X)	**Acclaimed**	

== LaSalle ==
=== Mayor ===
Mayoral Candidate	Vote	%
**Marc A. Bondy**	**6,021**	**61.87**
Gary Baxter	3,711	38.13

== Leamington ==
=== Mayor ===
Mayoral Candidate	Vote	%
**Hilda Macdonald**	**4,341**	**60.23**
John Paterson (X)	2,533	35.15
Bruce Medcalf	333	4.62

== Tecumseh ==
=== Mayor ===
Mayoral Candidate	Vote	%
**Gary McNamara** (X)	**Acclaimed**	
