= 2018 Windsor municipal election =

Election in Ontario, Canada

- October 22, 2018
- Turnout: 35.21% (▼2.25 pp)
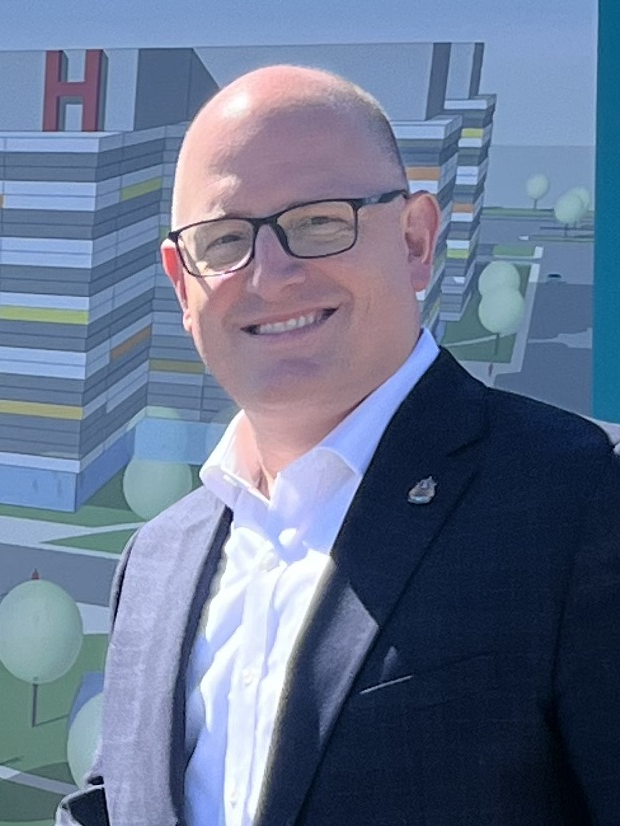
Nominee	Drew Dilkens	Matt Marchand
Popular vote	31,201	18,626
Percentage	59.40%	35.46%
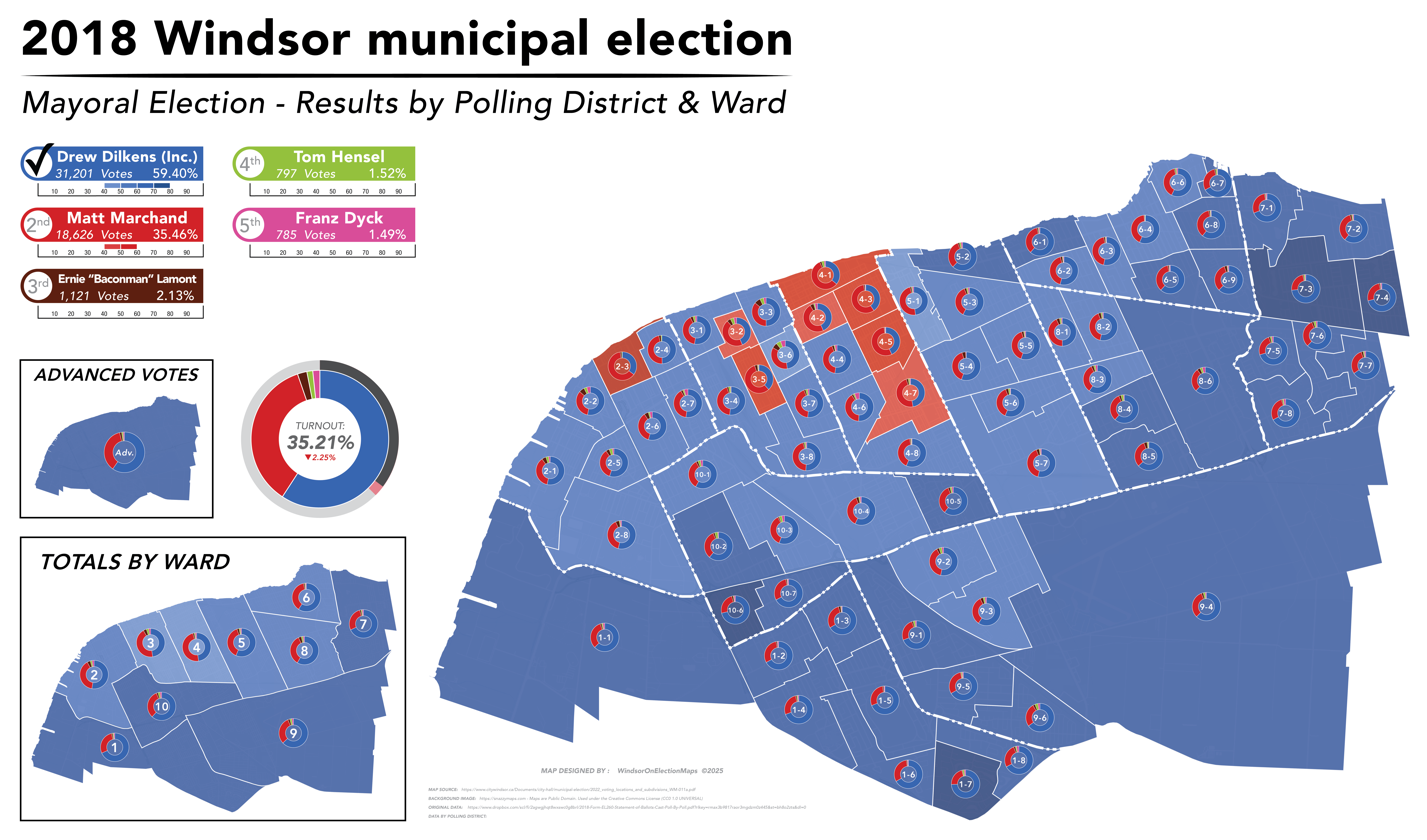
- Map showing the winning candidate's vote strength in each of the 10 wards and their respective polling districts. The districts shaded in Blue voted a majority for Drew Dilkens, and Red voted a majority for Matt Marchand. Pie Charts indicate the total vote of all candidates per Ward/polling district.
Mayor before election
Drew Dilkens
Elected mayor
Drew Dilkens

The 2018 Windsor municipal election occurred on October 22, 2018 to elect the Mayor of Windsor, Windsor City Council and the Greater Essex County District School Board, Windsor Essex Catholic District School Board, Conseil scolaire catholique Providence and Conseil scolaire Viamonde.

The election was held on the same day as elections in every other municipality in Ontario, as well as the elections in neighbouring towns in Essex County.

As per the Ontario Municipal Elections Act, 1996, nomination papers for candidates for municipal and school board elections would be filed from May 1, 2018, at which time the campaign period began.

== Mayor ==
Candidate	Popular vote		
Candidate	Votes	%	±%
Drew Dilkens (X)	31,201	59.40	+4.04
Matt Marchand	18,626	35.46	--
Ernie "The Baconman" Lamont	1,121	2.13	+1.03
Tom Hensel	797	1.52	--
Frank Dyck	785	1.49	--
Total valid votes	52,530	99.07	
Total rejected, unmarked and declined votes	496	0.93	
Turnout	53,026	35.21	-2.25
Eligible voters	150,602		
Note: Candidate campaign colours are based on the prominent colour used in campaign items (signs, literature, etc.) and are used as a visual differentiation between candidates. Colours from prior party affiliations may be used as well.

== City Council ==
=== Ward 1 ===
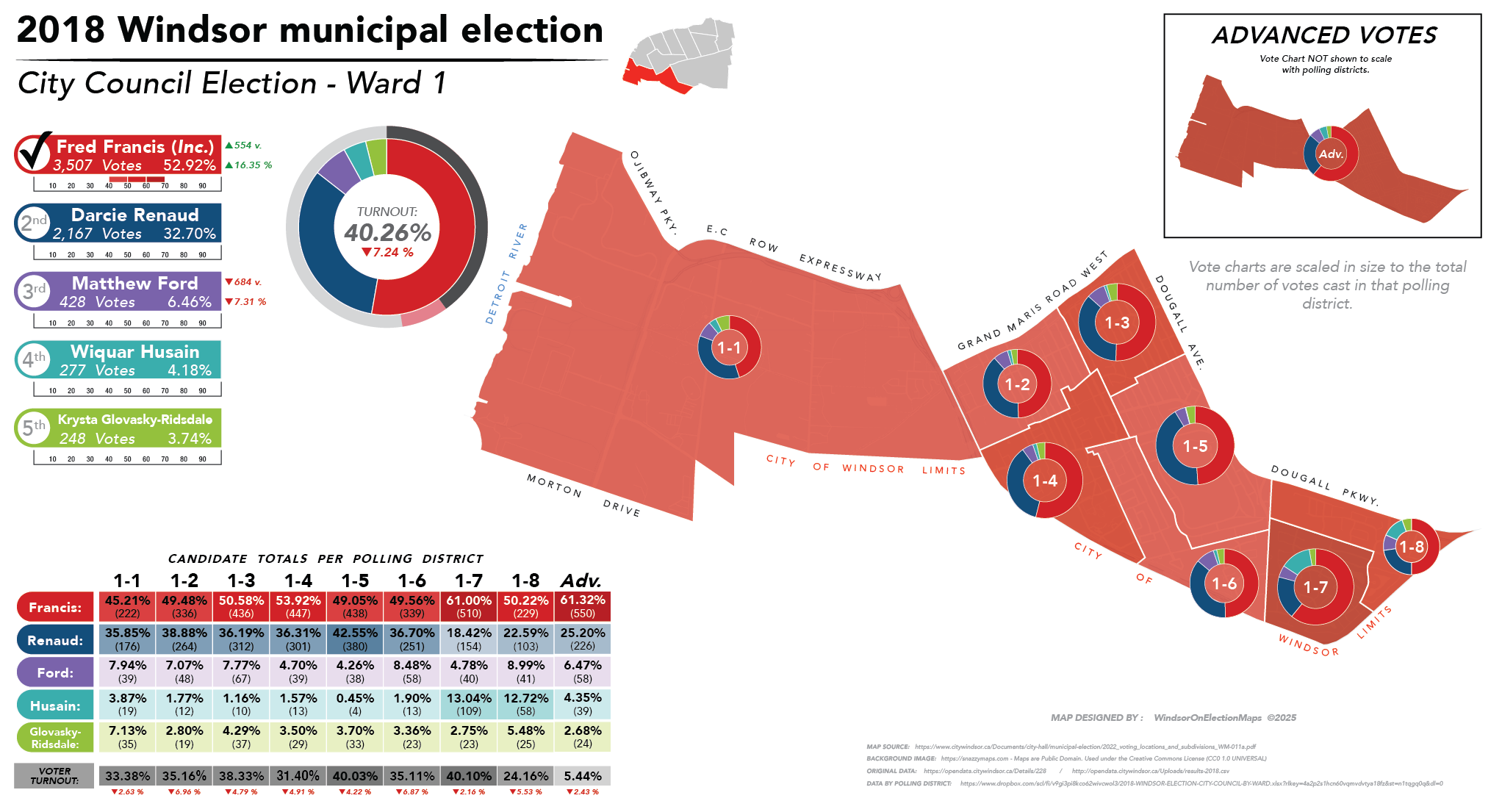
Results of the election in Ward 1. Polling districts are shaded by which candidate gained the majority of the vote.

Candidate	Popular vote		
Candidate	Votes	%	±%
Fred Francis (X)	3,507	52.92	+16.35
Darcie Renaud	2,167	32.70	--
Matt Ford	428	6.46	-7.31
Wiquar Husain	277	4.18	--
Krysta Glovasky-Ridsdale	248	3.74	--
Total valid votes	6,627	98.59	
Total rejected, unmarked and declined votes	95	1.41	
Turnout	6,722	40.26	-7.24
Eligible voters	16,698		
Note: Candidate campaign colours are based on the prominent colour used in campaign items (signs, literature, etc.) and are used as a visual differentiation between candidates. Colours from prior party affiliations may be used as well.

=== Ward 2 ===
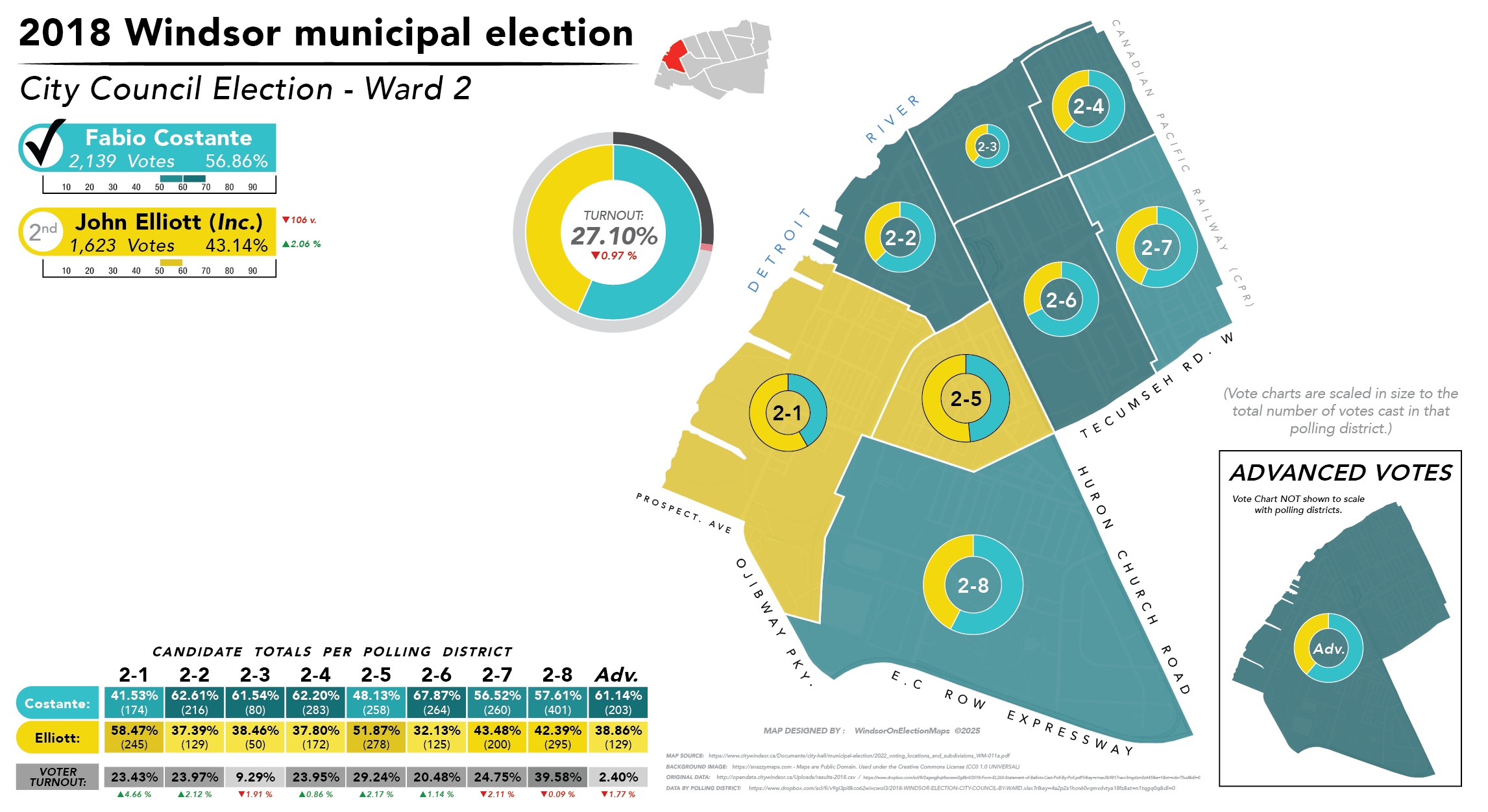
Results of the election in Ward 2. Polling districts are shaded by which candidate gained the majority of the vote.

Candidate	Popular vote		
Candidate	Votes	%	±%
Fabio Costante	2,139	56.86	--
John Elliott (X)	1,623	43.14	+2.06
Total valid votes	3,762	98.62	
Total rejected, unmarked and declined votes	53	1.38	
Turnout	3,815	27.10	-0.97
Eligible voters	14,078		
Note: Candidate campaign colours are based on the prominent colour used in campaign items (signs, literature, etc.) and are used as a visual differentiation between candidates. Colours from prior party affiliations may be used as well.

=== Ward 3 ===
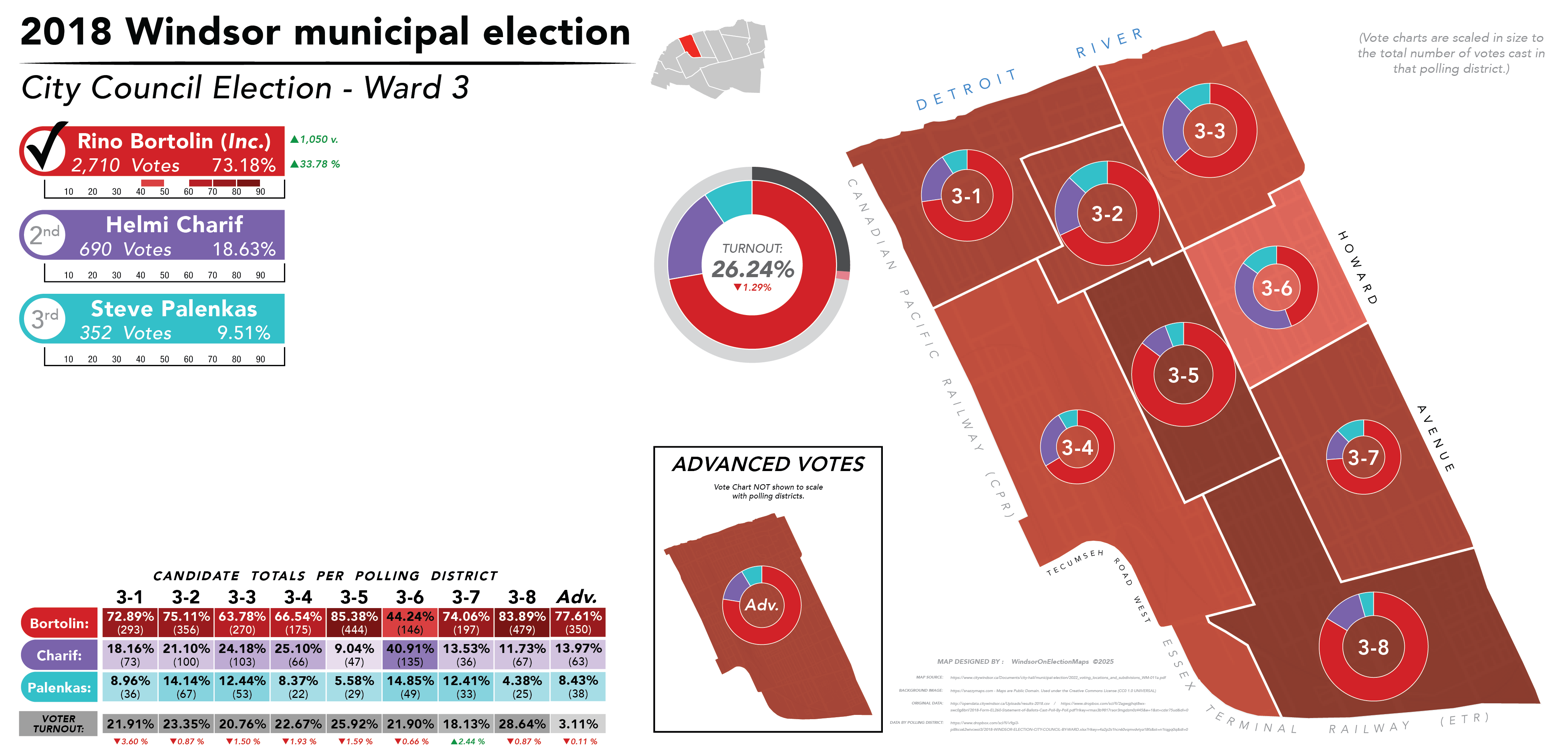
Results of the election in Ward 3. Polling districts are shaded by which candidate gained the majority of the vote.

Candidate	Popular vote		
Candidate	Votes	%	±%
Rino Bortolin (X)	2,710	72.33	+33.78
Helmi Charif	690	18.39	--
Steve Palenkas	352	9.38	--
Total valid votes	3,703	95.86	
Total rejected, unmarked and declined votes	160	4.14	
Turnout	3,863	26.24	-1.29
Eligible voters	14,720		
Note: Candidate campaign colours are based on the prominent colour used in campaign items (signs, literature, etc.) and are used as a visual differentiation between candidates. Colours from prior party affiliations may be used as well.

=== Ward 4 ===
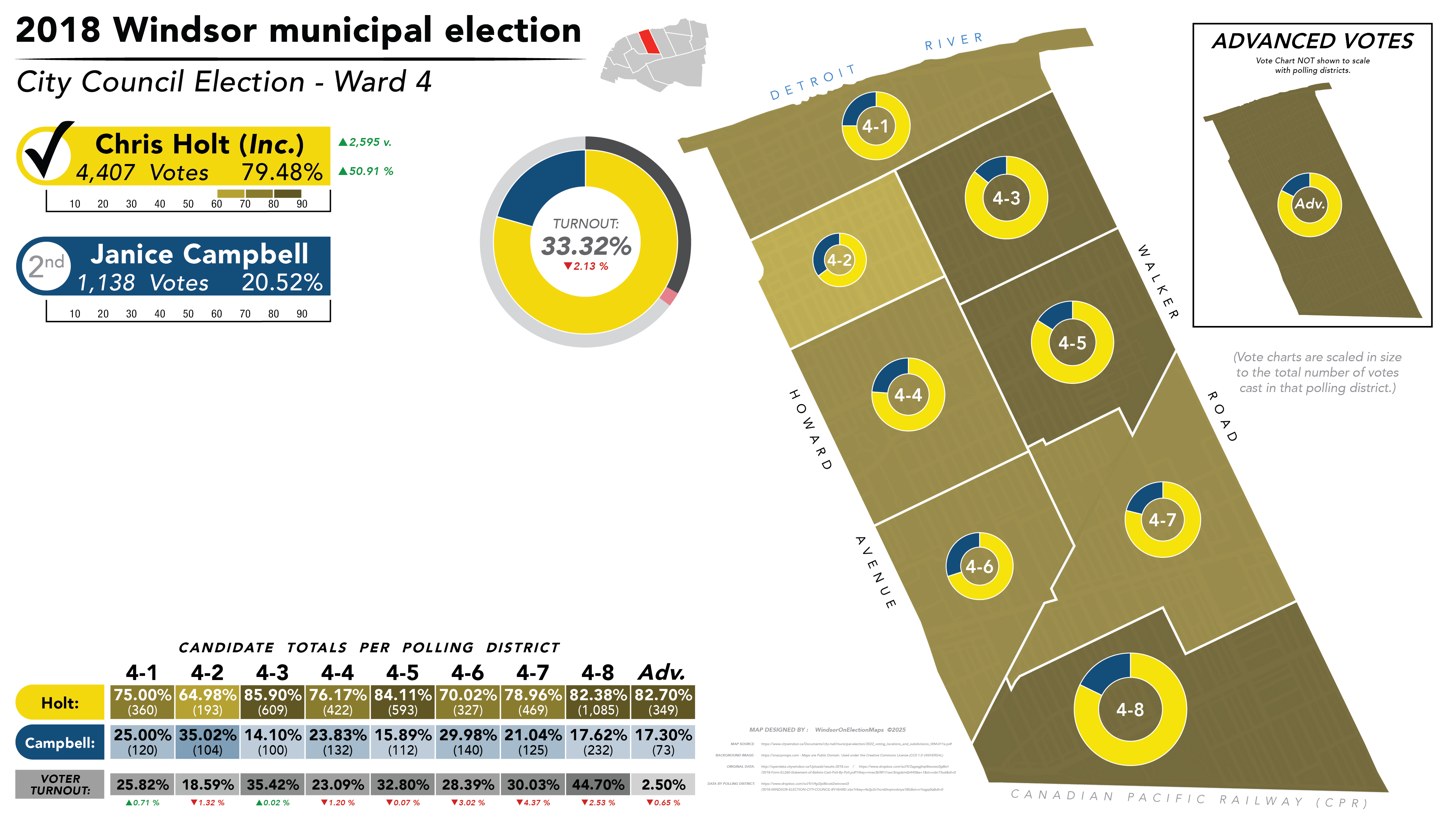
Results of the election in Ward 4. Polling districts are shaded by which candidate gained the majority of the vote.

Candidate	Popular vote		
Candidate	Votes	%	±%
Chris Holt (X)	4,407	79.48	+50.91
Janice Campbell	1,138	20.52	--
Total valid votes	5,545	96.79	
Total rejected, unmarked and declined votes	178	3.21	
Turnout	5,723	33.32	-2.13
Eligible voters	17,174		
Note: Candidate campaign colours are based on the prominent colour used in campaign items (signs, literature, etc.) and are used as a visual differentiation between candidates. Colours from prior party affiliations may be used as well.

=== Ward 5 ===
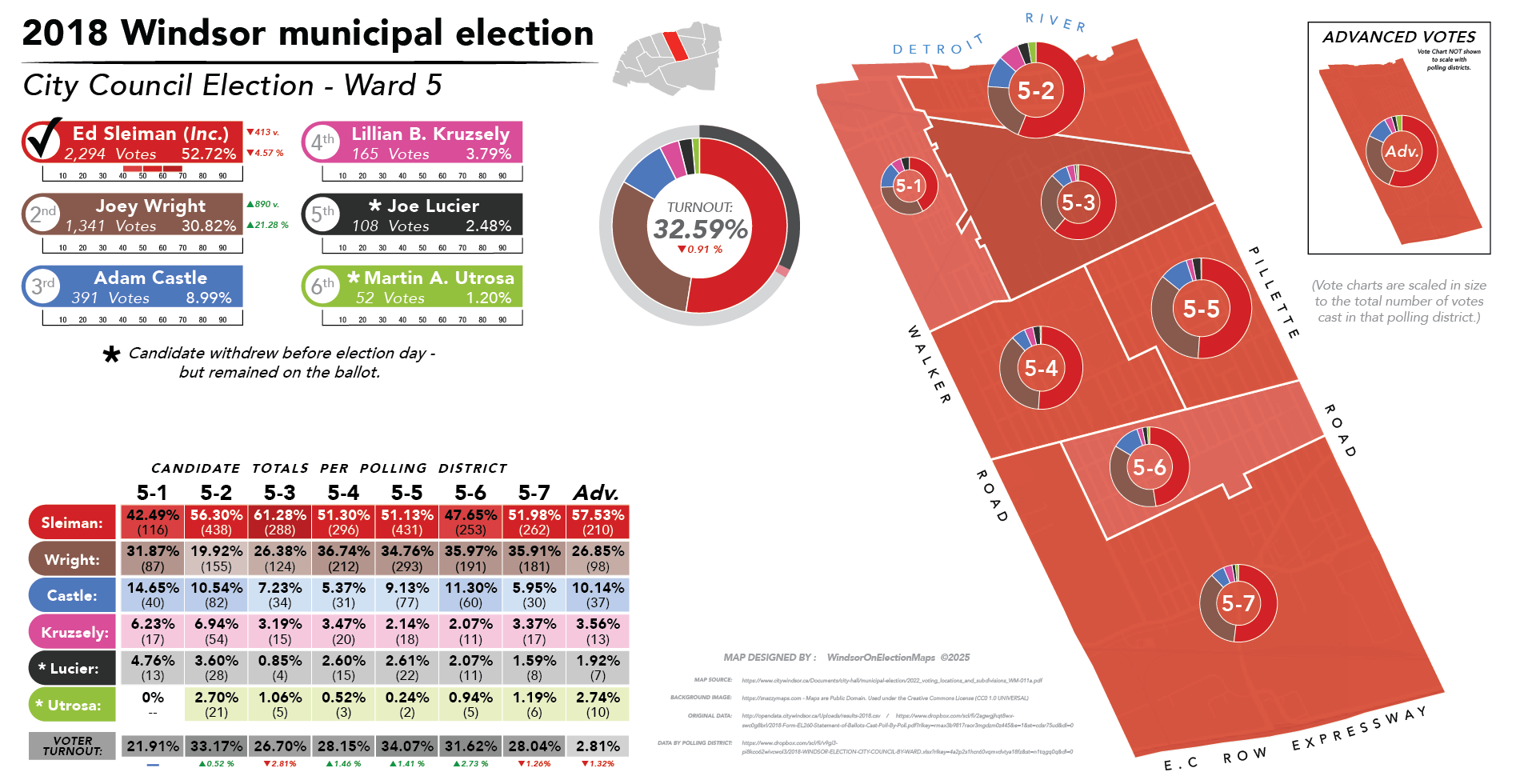
Results of the election in Ward 5. Polling districts are shaded by which candidate gained the majority of the vote.

Candidate	Popular vote		
Candidate	Votes	%	±%
Ed Sleiman (X)	2,294	52.72	-4.57
Joey Wright	1,341	30.82	+21.28
Adam Castle	391	8.99	--
Lillian B. Kruzsely	165	3.79	--
Joe Lucier* (withdrawn, but still on ballot.)	108	2.48	--
Martin A. Utrosa* (withdrawn, but still on ballot.)	52	1.20	--
Total valid votes	4,341	98.62	
Total rejected, unmarked and declined votes	61	1.38	
Turnout	4,402	32.59	-0.91
Eligible voters	13,506		
Note: Candidate campaign colours are based on the prominent colour used in campaign items (signs, literature, etc.) and are used as a visual differentiation between candidates. Colours from prior party affiliations may be used as well.

=== Ward 6 ===
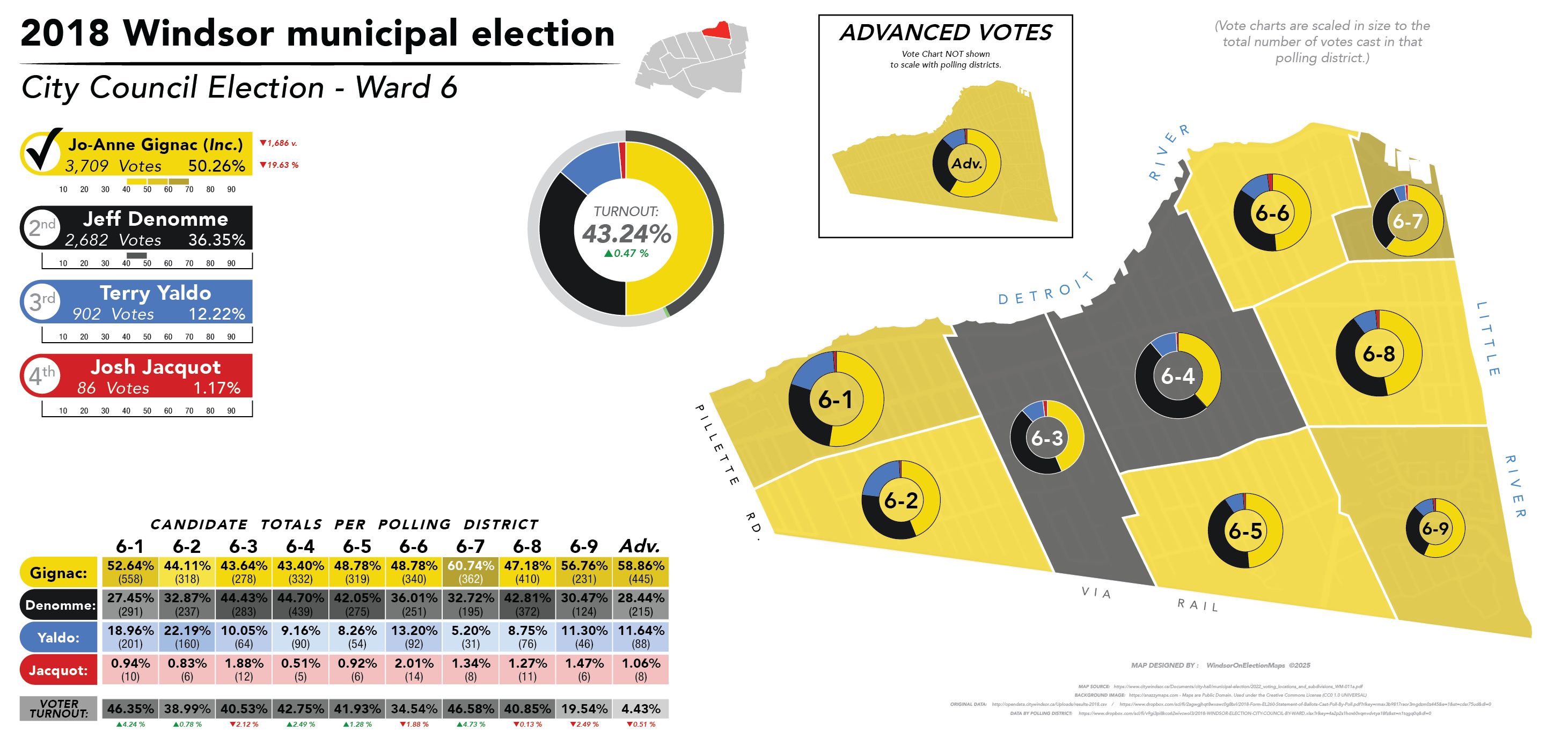
Results of the election in Ward 6. Polling districts are shaded by which candidate gained the majority of the vote.

Candidate	Popular vote		
Candidate	Votes	%	±%
Jo-Anne Gignac (X)	3,079	50.26	-19.63
Jeff Denomme	2,682	36.35	--
Terry Yaldo	902	12.22	--
Josh Jacquot	86	1.17	--
Total valid votes	7,379	99.25	
Total rejected, unmarked and declined votes	56	0.75	
Turnout	7,435	43.24	+0.47
Eligible voters	17,196		
Note: Candidate campaign colours are based on the prominent colour used in campaign items (signs, literature, etc.) and are used as a visual differentiation between candidates. Colours from prior party affiliations may be used as well.

=== Ward 7 ===
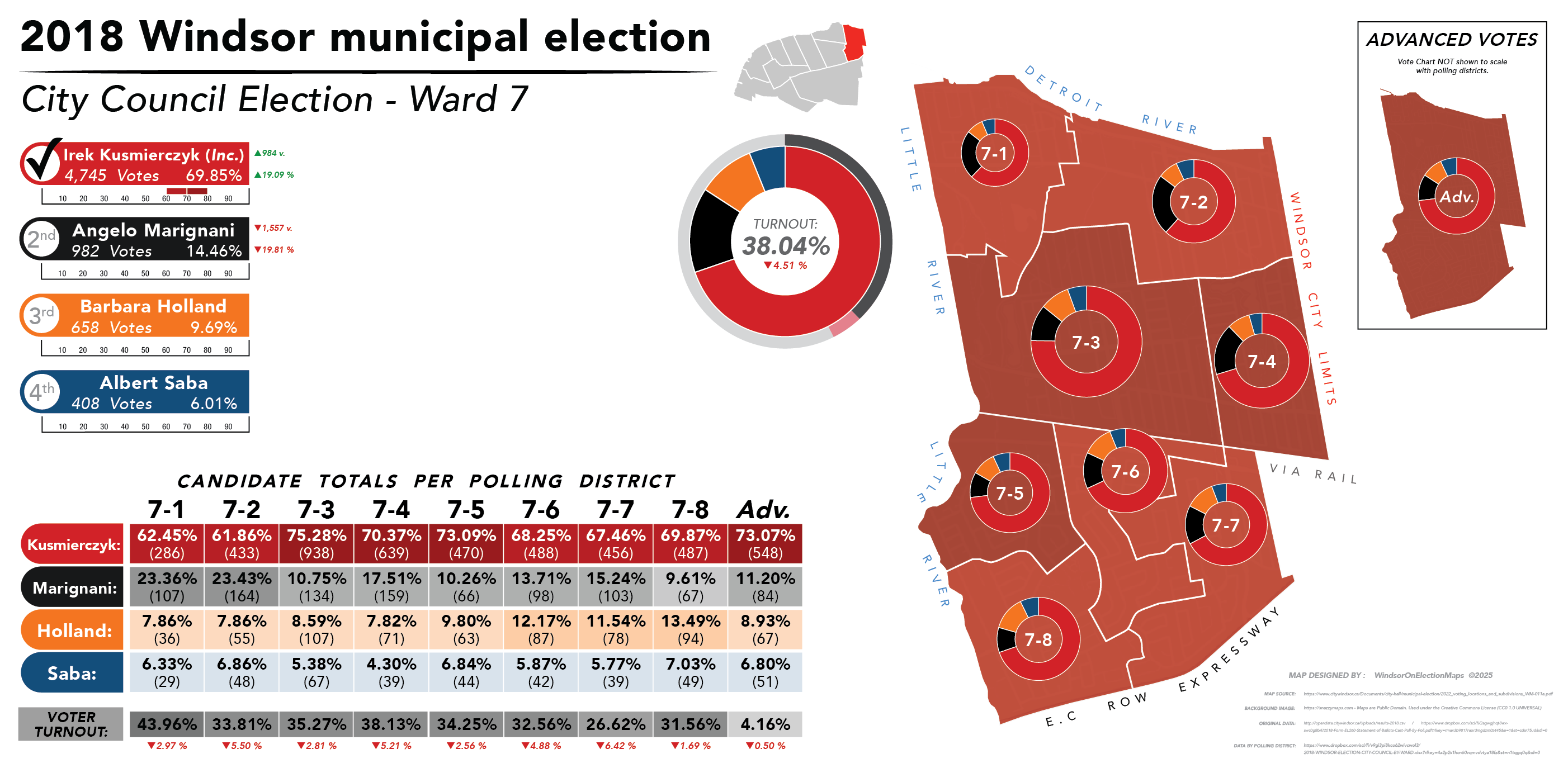
Results of the election in Ward 7. Polling districts are shaded by which candidate gained the majority of the vote.

Candidate	Popular vote		
Candidate	Votes	%	±%
Irek Kusmierczyk (X)	4,745	69.85	+19.09
Angelo Marignani	982	14.46	-19.81
Barbara Holland	658	9.69	--
Albert Saba	408	6.01	--
Total valid votes	6,793	98.90	
Total rejected, unmarked and declined votes	76	1.10	
Turnout	6,869	38.04	-4.51
Eligible voters	18,058		
Note: Candidate campaign colours are based on the prominent colour used in campaign items (signs, literature, etc.) and are used as a visual differentiation between candidates. Colours from prior party affiliations may be used as well.

=== Ward 8 ===
Incumbent Councillor Bill Marra announced in April 2018 that he was not running for another term, after serving six terms (and one unsuccessful mayoral run) on Council since 1994.

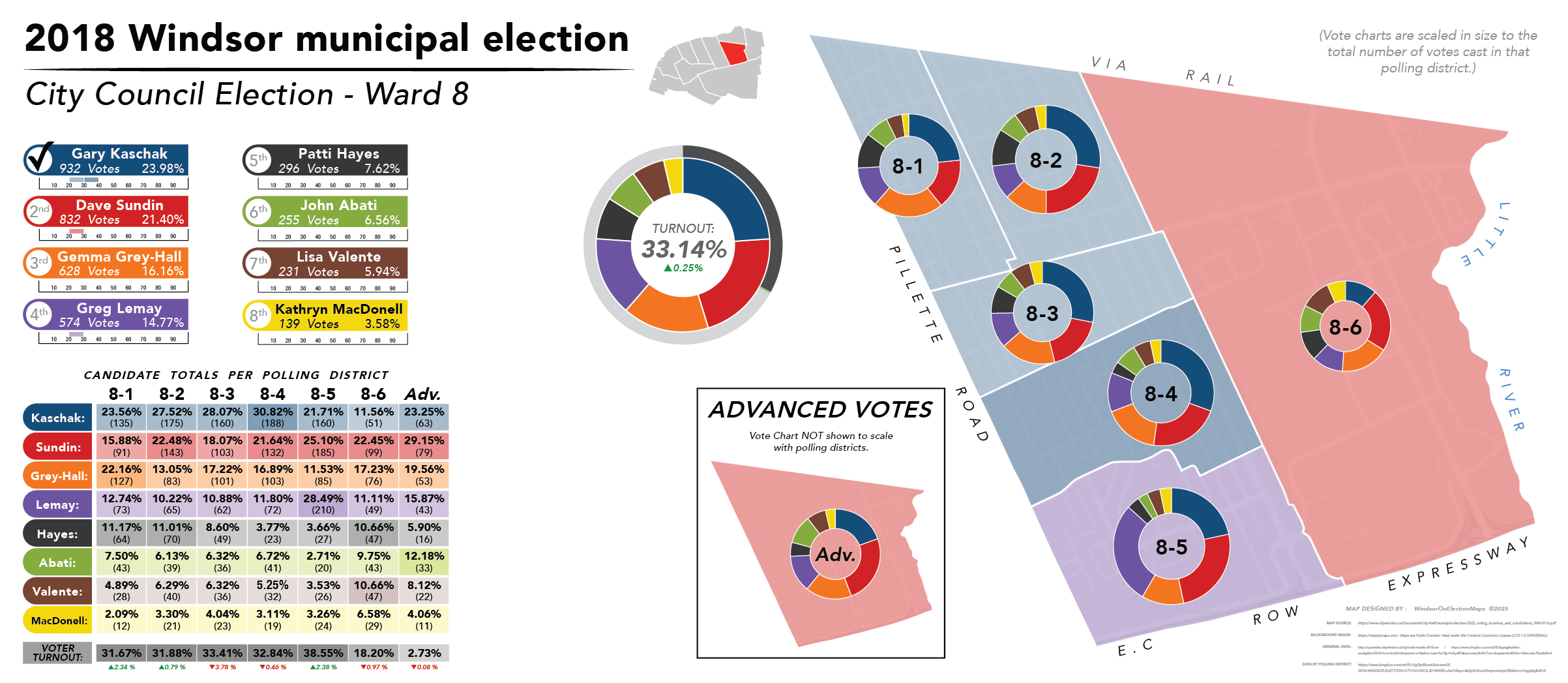
Results of the election in Ward 8. Polling districts are shaded by which candidate gained the majority of the vote.

Candidate	Popular vote		
Candidate	Votes	%	±%
Gary Kaschak	932	23.98	--
Dave Sundin	832	21.40	--
Gemma Grey-Hall	628	16.16	--
Greg Lemay	574	14.77	--
Patti Hayes	296	7.62	--
John Abati	255	6.56	--
Lisa Valentine	231	5.94	--
Kathryn MacDonell	139	3.58	--
Total valid votes	3,838	97.44	
Total rejected, unmarked and declined votes	101	2.56	
Turnout	3,939	33.14	+0.25
Eligible voters	11,886		
Note: Candidate campaign colours are based on the prominent colour used in campaign items (signs, literature, etc.) and are used as a visual differentiation between candidates. Colours from prior party affiliations may be used as well.

=== Ward 9 ===
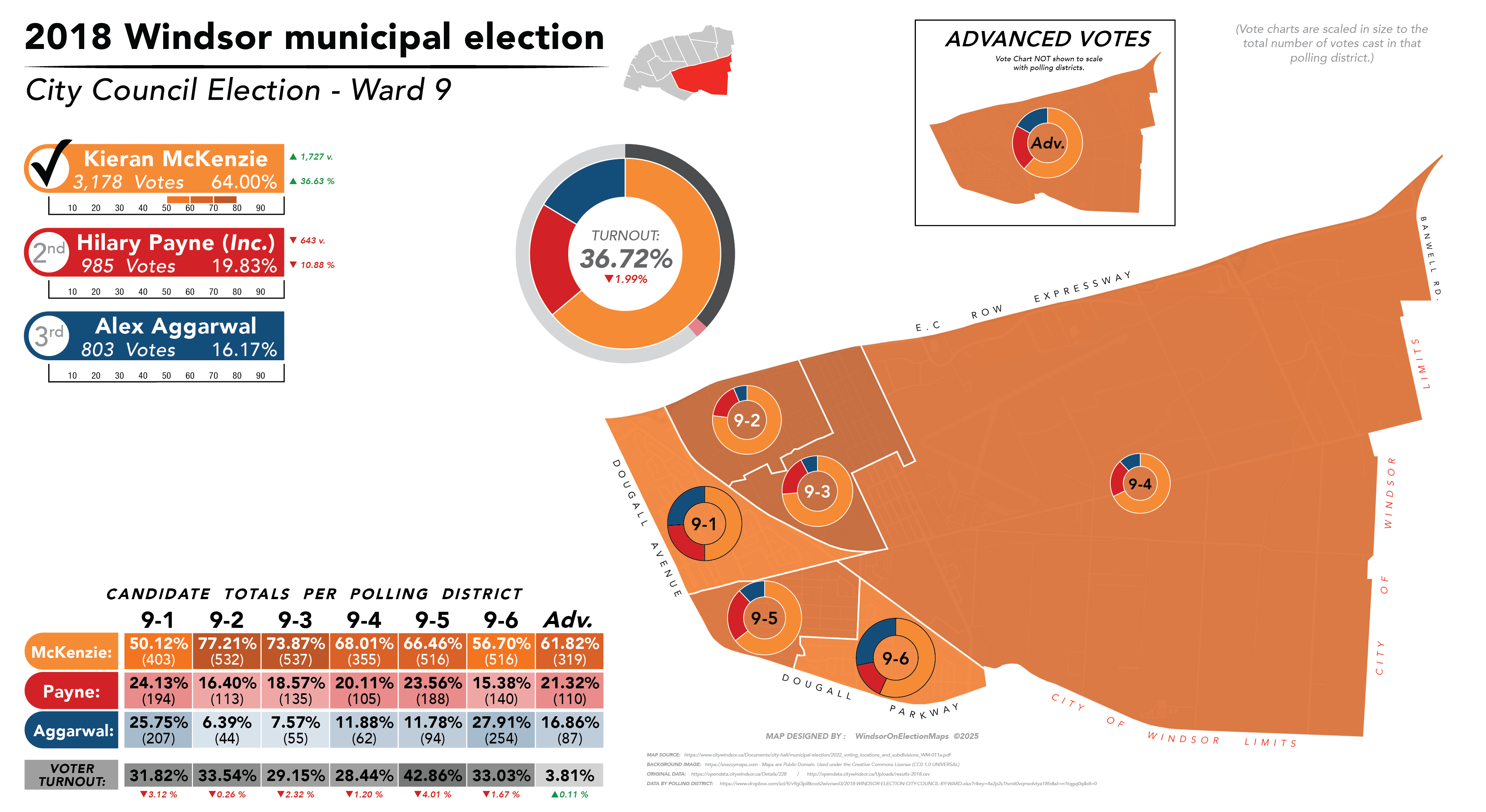
Results of the election in Ward 9. Polling districts are shaded by which candidate gained the majority of the vote.

Candidate	Popular vote		
Candidate	Votes	%	±%
Kieran McKenzie	3,178	64.00	+36.63
Hilary Payne (X)	985	19.83	-10.88
Alex Aggarwal	803	16.17	--
Total valid votes	4,966	98.97	
Total rejected, unmarked and declined votes	52	1.03	
Turnout	5,018	36.72	-1.99
Eligible voters	13,666		
Note: Candidate campaign colours are based on the prominent colour used in campaign items (signs, literature, etc.) and are used as a visual differentiation between candidates. Colours from prior party affiliations may be used as well.

=== Ward 10 ===
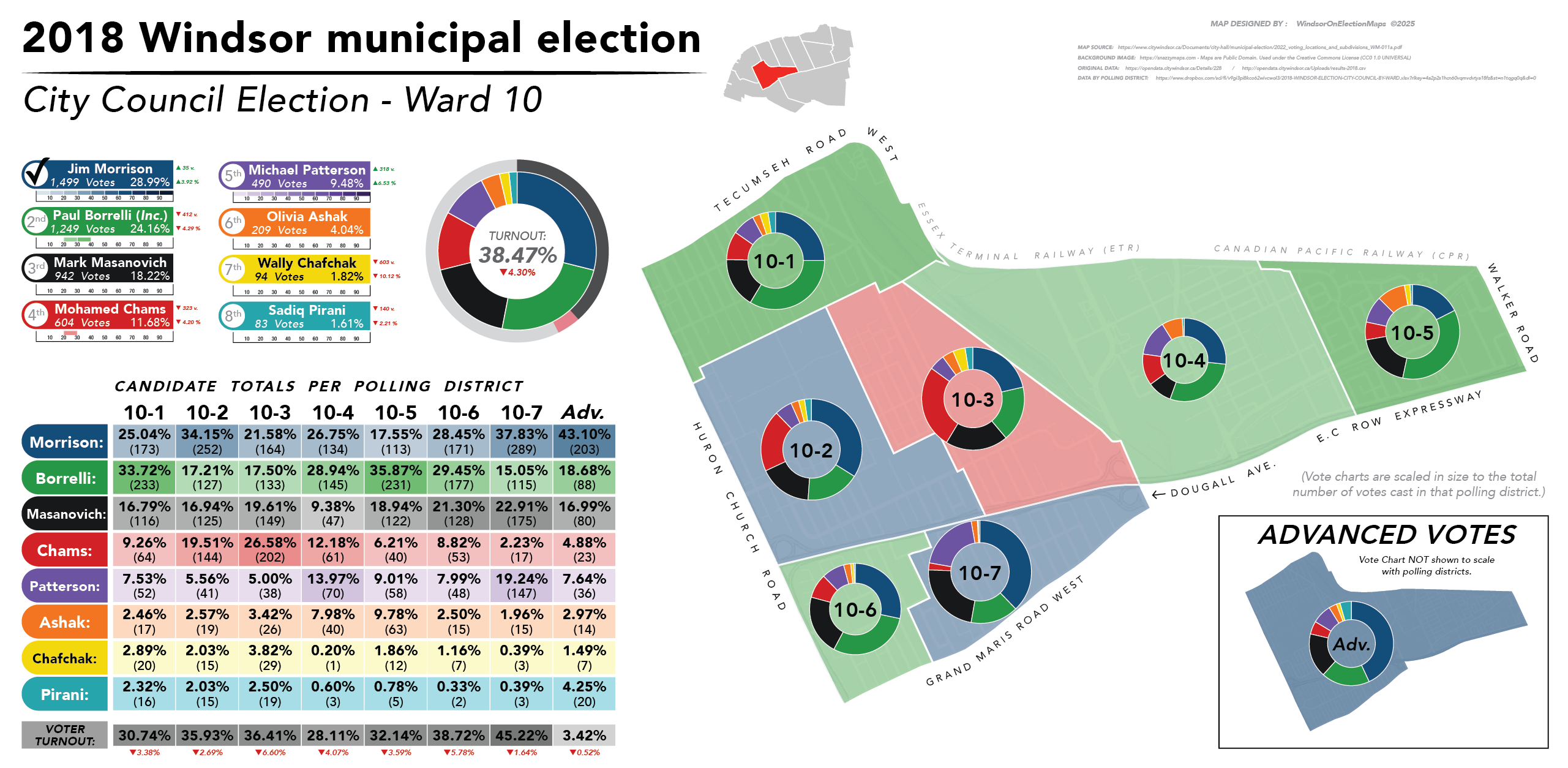
Results of the election in Ward 10. Polling districts are shaded by which candidate gained the majority of the vote.

Candidate	Popular vote		
Candidate	Votes	%	±%
Jim Morrison	1,499	28.99	+3.92
Paul Borrelli (X)	1,249	24.16	-4.29
Mark Masanovich	942	18.22	--
Mohamed Chams	604	11.68	-4.20
Michael Patterson	490	9.48	+6.53
Olivia Ashak	209	4.04	--
Wally Chafchak	94	1.82	-10.12
Sadiq Pirani	83	1.61	-2.21
Total valid votes	5,170	98.67	
Total rejected, unmarked and declined votes	70	1.33	
Turnout	5,240	38.47	-4.30
Eligible voters	13,620		
Note: Candidate campaign colours are based on the prominent colour used in campaign items (signs, literature, etc.) and are used as a visual differentiation between candidates. Colours from prior party affiliations may be used as well.

== Greater Essex County District School Board ==
=== Wards 1, 2, 9 ===
Trustee Candidate	Vote	%
Jessica Sartori	4332	26.1%
Linda Qin	3625	21.8%
Kim McKinley	3399	20.5%
Patrick Hannon	2146	12.9%
Shirley-Lyn Watson	2053	12.4%
Sushi Jain	1040	6.3%

=== Wards 3, 4, 10 ===
Trustee Candidate	Vote	%
Sarah Cipkar	5310	31.5%
Alan Halberstadt	4916	29.2%
David Ferguson	2698	16%
Katrina Elchami	1429	8.5%
Omar Chafchak	1313	7.8%
Jag Pathak	634	3.8%
Beau Helbert	543	3.2%

=== Wards 5, 6, 7, 8 ===
Trustee Candidate	Vote	%
Cathy Cooke	7629	33.6%
Gale Simko Hatfield	5474	24.1%
Cheryl Lovell	4984	22%
Henry Lau	2811	12.4%
Laurie Komon	1805	8%

== Windsor Essex Catholic District School Board ==
=== Wards 1, 10 ===
Trustee Candidate	Vote	%
Fulvio Velentinis	2860	72.5%
Kevin M. Homick	703	17.8%
Joshua Pinese	384	9.7%

=== Wards 2, 9 ===
Trustee Candidate	Vote	%
Tony Polifroni	1922	72.4%
Xavier Gonzalez	731	27.6%

=== Wards 3, 4 ===
Trustee Candidate	Vote	%
Bernard Mastromattei	990	48.9%
Eric Renaud	560	27.7%
Andrew Furlong	474	23.4%

=== Wards 5, 8 ===
Trustee Candidate	Vote	%
Fred Alexander	1439	57.4%
Jason Lazarus	1067	42.6%

=== Wards 6, 7 ===
Trustee Candidate	Vote	%
Kim Bouchard	3391	69.8%
Jeremy Renaud	1465	30.2%

== Conseil Scolaire Viamonde ==
=== Wards 1-10 (Windsor only) ===
Trustee Candidate	Vote	%
Guillaume Teasdale	250	56.2%
Owen Herold	107	24%
Yogen Noyadoo	88	19.8%

== Conseil Scolaire Catholique Providence ==
=== Wards 6, 7 (Windsor only) ===
Trustee Candidate	Vote	%
Pauline Morais	386	85%
François Nono	68	15%
