= Longue Vue Island =

- U.S. National Register of Historic Places
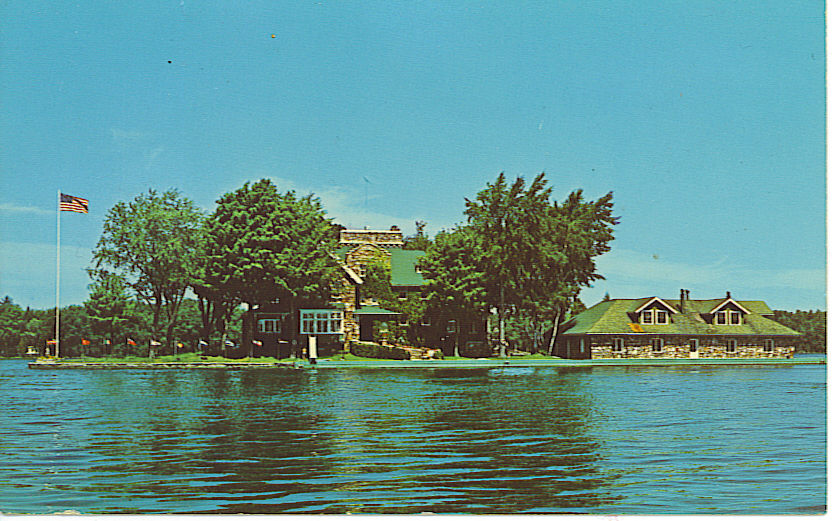
- Postcard of Longue Vue Island taken during the 1970s

- Location within New York Location within the United States
- Location: St. Lawrence River at Alexandria, near Alexandria Bay, New York
- Coordinates: 44°19′19″N 75°56′26″W
- Area: 1.3 acres (0.53 ha)
- Built: 1906
- Architect: Barney and Chapman
- Architectural style: Arts & Crafts
- NRHP reference No.: 82001176
- Added to NRHP: November 04, 1982

Longue Vue Island is an island located in the Thousand Islands region on the Saint Lawrence River. The island is on the American side of the river, adjacent to the St. Lawrence Seaway channel in Northern New York. It is a part of the Town of Alexandria, in Jefferson County, New York. It is the only artificial island in the entire region.

The original owner of the house was Hudson Rose, a New York City lumber dealer. The island was originally named Rossette after Rose. The home was bought in the mid-1920s by Temple Berdan, and was empty from 1932 to 1939. Lewis Dollinger purchased the home from Berdan's estate. It was later owned by the Dollinger Corporation and, after the tax laws were changed in the 1970s, was owned by the son of Dollinger Corporation founder Lewis Dollinger, F. Leslie Dollinger for many years. It was sold in 1994 to Arizona businessman Al Wareing, who is the current owner.

== Construction ==
The construction drawings for Mr. and Mrs. Hudson P. Rose were provided by architects Barney and Chapman of New York and were approved on April 26, 1905. The first contract for materials was by the Otis Brooks Lumber Company of Clayton, New York and was signed on July 15, 1905. The May 3, 1905 edition of the Watertown Daily Times reported that Mr. & Mrs Hudson P. Rose were to have a home built on their property near point Vivian the following season. The home and boathouse that are situated on it were built in 1906. The island was constructed on four rock shoals, by building a rock wall around the shoals from a nearby quarry, then filling the area in with rock and soil. The construction was done by Barney & Chapman.

In the 1990s, construction was done to the boathouse to repair it, as the building was starting to fall into the river. New rock walls were placed in the building to stop the descent and the level of the island was raised by about one foot (0.30 m) by adding another level of rock, soil, and grass seed. The upstairs of the boathouse was also altered to include a full wet-bar, and deck space was located onto the roof. No alteration construction work may be done on the outside of the house, as it is registered on the National Register of Historic Places.

Tour boat passing Longue Vue Island

== Island layout ==
The island has an approximately 7,000-square-foot (650 m^{2}) house on the center. The boathouse, while smaller, has three boat slips, which have held as many as six boats over the years. The second floor includes a game room with wet bar. The flagpole (which was originally on the top of the house) is on the western tip of the island and has a plaque next to it noting the fact that the founder of Dollinger Corporation, Lewis Dollinger, died on the island. There is plenty of lawn space on the island, and swimming space, including a dock and a water slide.

The three-story home includes a kitchen, small breakfast room, large living room, dining room, and large porch surrounding the house on two sides on the first floor. The second and third floors are mostly bedrooms and bathrooms. In addition to the four-sided open stairwell, the second floor is connected to the kitchen on the first floor via a small spiral stairway hidden behind a closet door, presumably intended for servant use. Within the basement of the house, one of the three shoals the island was built on can be seen sticking out of the floor and wall.

The island is within a short boat ride of Boldt Castle, a castle constructed around 1900, left unfinished in 1904.

The island also has a collection of flags which are flown at certain times during the summer. The flags are of all the different countries in the world. These flags are flown around the exterior of the island. In addition to the country flags, there is a flag for every state. These flags are on display during the Fourth of July weekend as well as Labor Day weekend.

== Ghost stories about Longue Vue Island ==
The current owners of Longue Vue Island have declared that they have seen the ghost of Lewis Dollinger roaming the house at night time. The son of former owner Leslie Dollinger, Doug Dollinger, also has believed to have stated that he saw the painting of Lewis Dollinger that used to be in the dining room come alive at night time and tell him to get off the island back in the 1970s.
