= William P. Wentworth =

American architect (1839–1896)

- Born: April 23, 1839; Bellows Falls, Vermont, United States
- Died: April 12, 1896 (aged 56); Newton, Massachusetts, United States
- Occupation: Architect

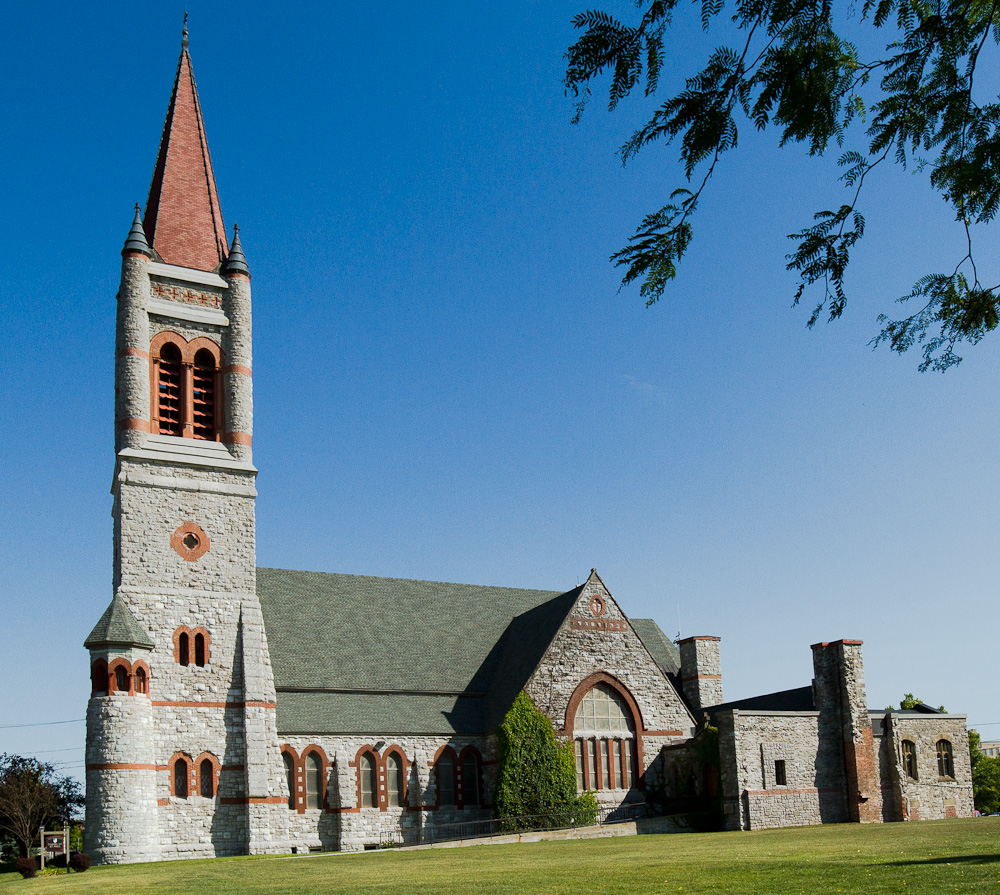
Trinity Episcopal Church in Watertown, New York, designed by Wentworth in the Gothic Revival style and completed in 1890

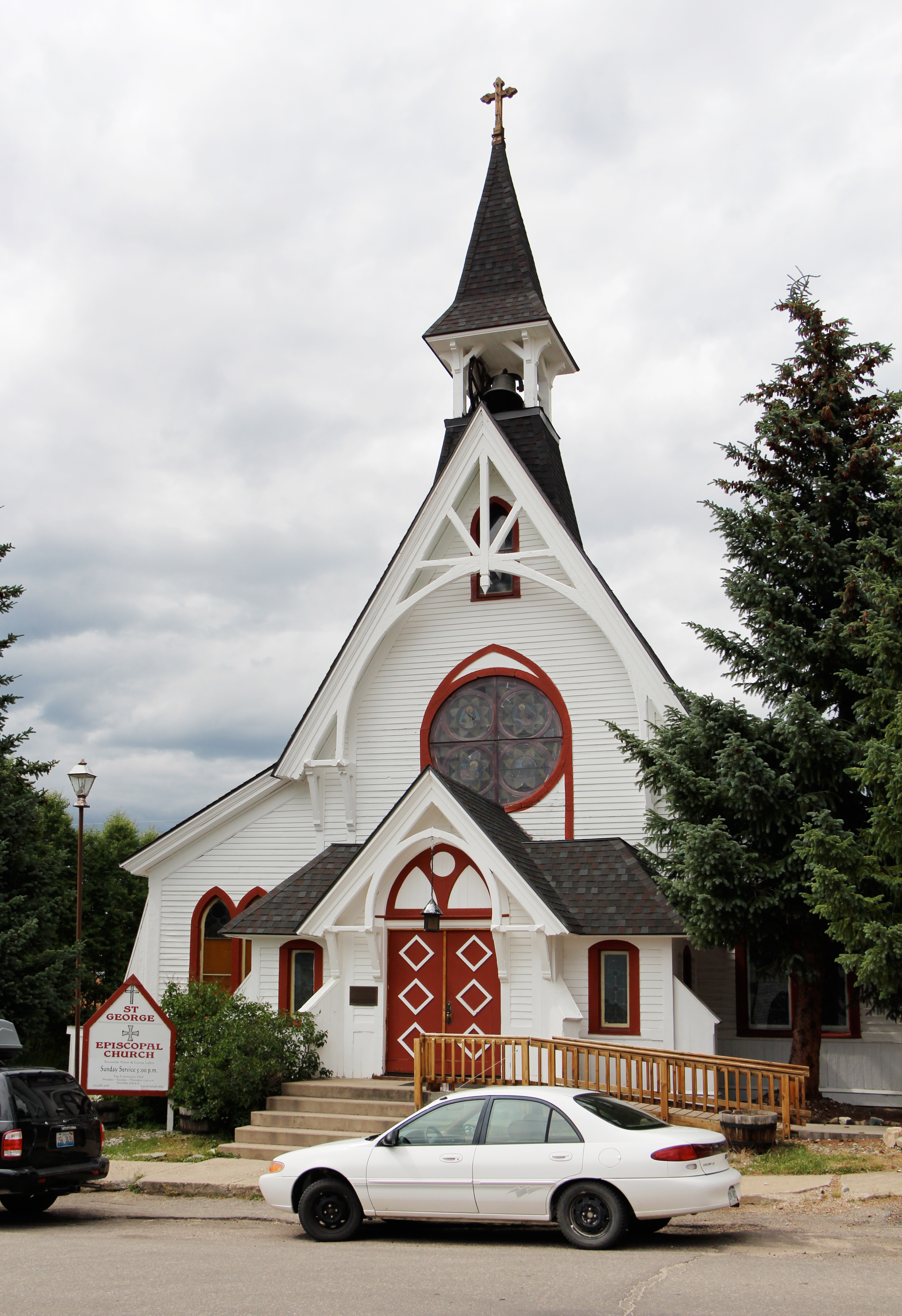
St. George's Episcopal Church in Leadville, Colorado, designed by Wentworth in the Stick Style and completed in 1881.

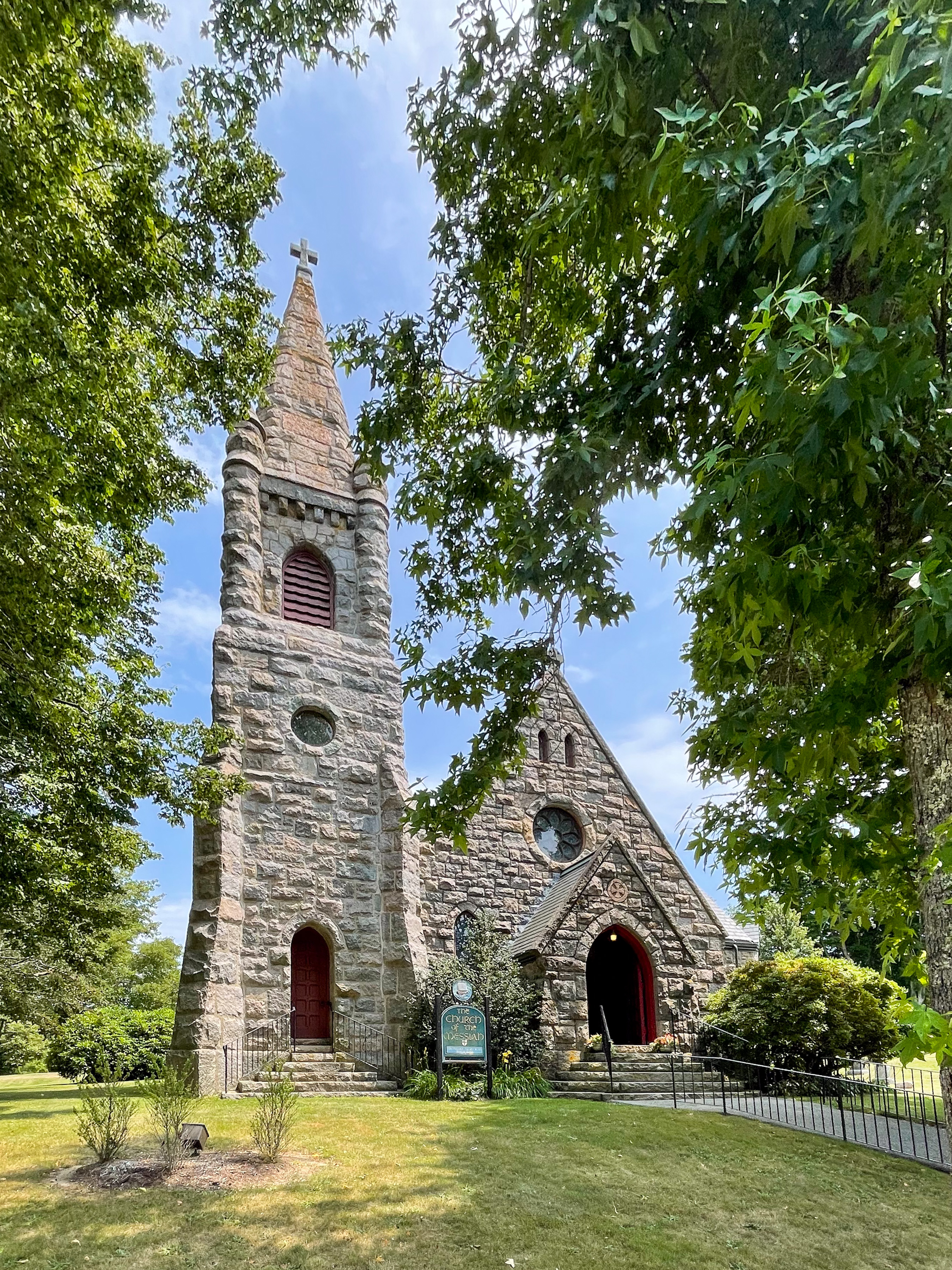
The Church of the Messiah, Episcopal, in Woods Hole, Massachusetts, designed by Wentworth in the Gothic Revival style and completed in 1889

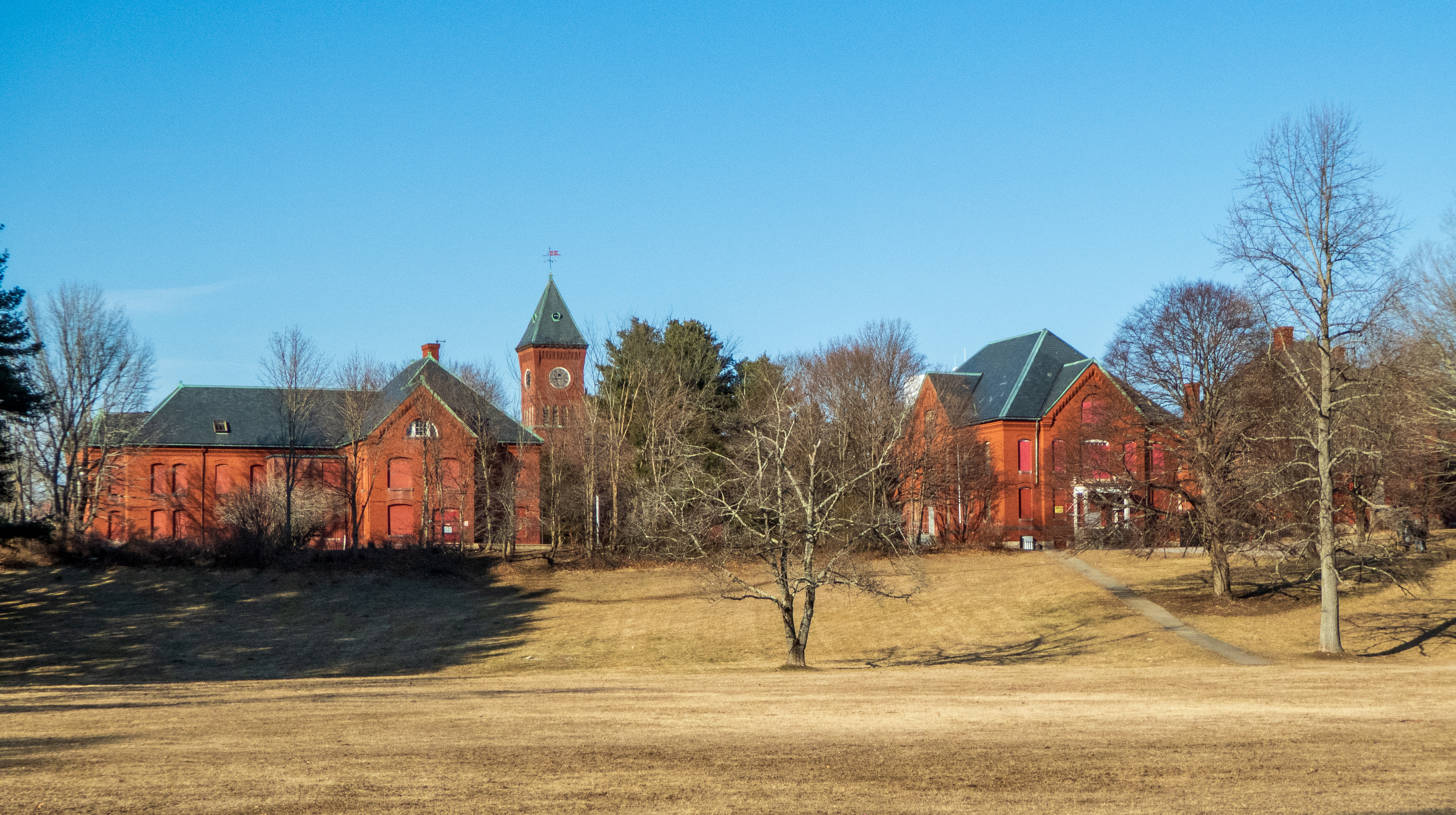
The buildings of Medfield State Hospital, designed by Wentworth, with contributions from S. Edwin Tobey, in a hybrid Queen Anne and Richardsonian Romanesque style and completed in 1896

William P. Wentworth (April 23, 1839 – April 12, 1896), typically abbreviated W. P. Wentworth, was an American architect active in Boston during the second half of the nineteenth century. Wentworth was best known as an architect of churches, which he designed throughout the United States and abroad. Later he developed a second specialty in hospitals, with his career culminating in the Medfield State Hospital.

== Life and career ==
William Pitt Wentworth was born April 23, 1839, in Bellows Falls, Vermont. He was the seventh and youngest child of Asa Wentworth Jr., then a Vermont state representative, and Lucy Wentworth, née Warren. His father, a Whig until the American Civil War, presumably named him for William Pitt the Elder, the British Whig statesman. He received his architectural training in New York City, possibly with Richard Upjohn–he was Upjohn's representative in Bellows Falls during the construction of Immanuel Episcopal Church (1867), of which Asa Wentworth was senior warden. He began practice in Boston c. 1870. He had a general practice but was best-known as an architect of hospitals and churches.

Most of Wentworth's churches were designed for Episcopalian congregations. In Massachusetts, these included the Church of the Good Shepherd (1876) in Dedham and the Church of the Messiah (1889) in Woods Hole and in Vermont, St. Luke's (1871) in Chester and St. Andrew's (1878) in St. Johnsbury. His practice was by no means limited to New England. Elsewhere in the United States, he designed St. Paul's (1879) in Waco, Texas, St. George's (1881) in Leadville, Colorado, St. James (1885) in Port Gibson, Mississippi, St. Lawrence (1889, NRHP-listed) in Alexandria Bay, New York, Trinity (1890, NRHP-listed)–his most elaborate parish church–in Watertown, New York, St. Luke's (1892, burned) in Norfolk, Virginia, St. Luke's (1894, NRHP-listed) in Jamestown, New York, and Trinity Cathedral (1894) in Easton, Maryland. Abroad, he designed the Collegiate Memorial (1884, demolished) of St. John's University in Shanghai and the Irving Memorial (projected 1885, begun 1898) above Robertsport, Liberia.

He designed at least two Catholic churches: St. Patrick's (1880) in Roxbury, Boston, and St. Catherine's (1880) in Charlestown, New Hampshire. All of his known churches are designed in a variation of the Gothic Revival style. When working for an urban or wealthy congregation he built in a monumental, stone English Gothic style, while for rural or poorer congregations he turned to the Carpenter Gothic as developed by Upjohn, Alexander Jackson Davis and vernacular builders.

His hospitals include the Mary Fletcher Hospital (1879) in Burlington, Vermont, Newton-Wellesley Hospital (1886, demolished), Woonsocket Hospital (1887, demolished), Quincy City Hospital (1890, demolished) and the Somerville Hospital (1892, demolished) Other projects include Dean Hall (1874) of Dean College in Franklin, Massachusetts, the Black River Academy (1888, NRHP-listed) in Ludlow, Vermont, and the Town Hall (1890) in Westminster, Vermont. He was not known as an architect of homes, but he designed at least two worth noting: the John G. Johnson house (1887) in Proctor, Vermont, now known as Wilson Castle, and the James W. Hunter house (1894) in Norfolk, Virginia, now the Hunter House Victorian Museum, both designed in an elaborate Richardsonian Romanesque style.

=== Medfield State Hospital ===
Wentworth's career culminated in the project for which he is best remembered: the Medfield State Hospital (1896, NRHP-listed). However, this project came with complications. He was appointed architect for the hospital, then known as the Medfield Insane Asylum, in 1890. It was intended as a hospital for the chronically mentally ill, the first such facility in the state. Plans and specifications were completed in 1891, with the project only requiring final appropriations to begin. In June governor William E. Russell vetoed the initial bill which would have funded the project. He believed that by delegating the project to a committee of salaried commissioners, those commissioners would extend the project as long as possible in order to keep drawing their salaries, desiring instead to place it in the hands of a board of trustees which would transition to managing the institution after it was completed.

In 1892 the project moved ahead with commissioners who were to receive a fixed, one-time stipend. However, Wentworth had been replaced by S. Edwin Tobey, a somewhat obscure architect, best known for his nonetheless remarkable Hull Yacht Club (1891, destroyed). In February 1893, in the aftermath of a deadly fire at an institution in Dover, New Hampshire, safety concerns were raised over his revised plans. In June he was fired and replaced by Wentworth. Tobey argued that the commission did not have the authority to fire him and continued to superintend construction, apparently without pay; the contractors not recognizing Wentworth's authority. In December, several commissioners were asked to resign and others were removed by governor Russell, at which time it was charged that Tobey had been awarded the project–and contractors selected–as a means to pay off his personal debts to said contractor and possibly a commissioner–he was insolvent within a year. Wentworth's authority on site was not definitely established until February 1894, by which time construction had so advanced that five buildings had been roofed.

It is unclear how much Tobey contributed to the design of the hospital. Reporting in the Boston Globe implies that he prepared his own plans for the buildings, while a letter to the editor of the American Architect and Building News by then ex-governor Russell, responding to that journal's criticism, stated that Wentworth "drafted the plans originally of the asylum and...has since the discharge of Mr. Tobey, had full charge...of the construction of the buildings." This is apparently the last mention of Tobey in relation to the project. Parts of the complex begun after Tobey's final removal, such as the chapel (1897), are definitely by Wentworth alone. Since that time, Wentworth has been considered the architect of the whole work, which was opened less than a month after his death.

Wentworth designed the hospital in a hybrid Queen Anne and Richardsonian Romanesque style. It was planned as a cottage hospital with the buildings arranged around quadrangles in the manner of a formal college campus. At the center is the chapel, now the Bellforge Arts Center, completed later than the other buildings. Since the closure of the hospital, much of the campus awaits reuse.

== Personal life, death and legacy ==
Wentworth was married in 1867 to Frances Williams, also a native of Bellows Falls. They had no children. He was a parishioner of Grace Episcopal Church in Newton and was its clerk for fifteen years. Wentworth's health began to decline at the beginning of 1896 and by April he was unable to leave his home. He died April 12, 1896, at the age of 56.

Wentworth has sometimes been confused with architect Charles Francis Wentworth, business partner of Ralph Adams Cram. They were distant cousins, being descendants of two sons of William Wentworth, an early settler of New Hampshire.

According to Clarence H. Blackall, writing in 1915, Wentworth was "a man who in his day was associated with much of the most serious and the best work of Boston." Blackall wrote this in reference to Charles Donagh Maginnis, who had begun his career with Wentworth.
