= Kestrel (steam yacht) =

1892 steam yacht

History

United States
- Name: Kestrel
- Builder: George Lawley & Son
- Completed: 1892
- Status: Museum ship

General characteristics
- Length: 63 ft (19 m)
- Propulsion: Steam
- Kestrel
- U.S. National Register of Historic Places
- Location within New York
- Location: Jefferson County, New York
- Coordinates: 44°20′47″N 75°55′37″W
- Built: 1892
- NRHP reference No.: 77000873
- Added to NRHP: August 12, 1977

Kestrel is a steam yacht that was built in 1892. It is located in the George C. Boldt Yacht House on the Saint Lawrence River in Jefferson County, New York.

The vessel was added to the National Register of Historic Places on August 12, 1977, when she was located in West New York, Hudson County, New Jersey, United States. Kestrel was donated in 2009 to the Thousand Islands Bridge Authority, which owns and operates Boldt Castle.

== History ==
Kestrel was designed by D. Crawford and built by George Lawley & Son at the South Boston shipyard in 1892. In 1899, Kestrel was sold to Samuel Keyser of Baltimore, Maryland.

In 1937, James A. Trowbridge of Norwalk, Connecticut, purchased Kestrel. An overhaul and replacement of parts was done in 1957.

Robert P. Scripps of New York became the owner of the yacht in 1972. The American Maritime Academy on Staten Island subsequently purchased the yacht from Scripps.

In 1988, the yacht was acquired at auction by John H. Luhrs of Ponte Vedra Beach, Florida. Luhrs had the steam engine completely repaired. In 2009, Luhrs donated Kestrel to the Thousand Islands Bridge Authority, which put it on display at Boldt Castle's Yacht House.

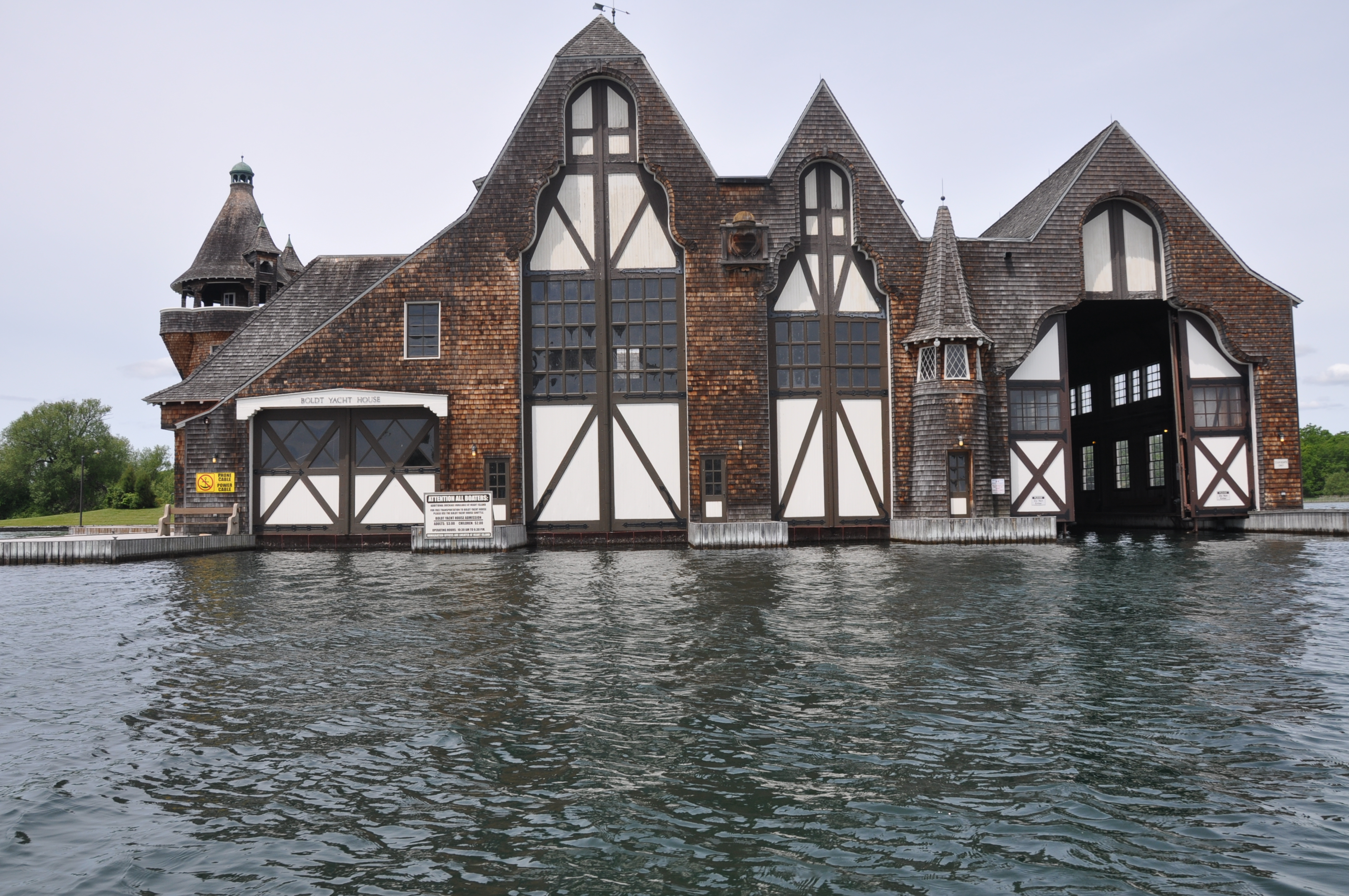
Boldt Castle's Yacht House
