= Calumet Island =

Island on the St. Lawrence River, New York

- Location within New York

Geography
- Location: St. Lawrence River
- Coordinates: 44°15′00″N 76°05′42″W
- Highest elevation: 253 ft (77.1 m)

Administration
- United States
- State: New York
- County: Jefferson
- Town: Clayton
- Owner: Private

Calumet Island is an island on the St. Lawrence River, located in the Town of Clayton in Jefferson County, New York. The island formerly featured one of the earliest examples of the large castles built in the Thousand Islands region during the late 19th and early 20th centuries, of which Boldt Castle is a surviving example.

== History ==
New York tobacco tycoon Charles G. Emery, a pioneering developer of the Thousand Islands region during the 1800s, purchased what was then known as Powder Horn Island in 1882. He changed the island's name to "Calumet", a French, colonial-era word often used for a Native American ceremonial pipe, in reference to the island's shape.

Construction of a castle began on the island in 1893, and was completed the following year. Once completed, the castle boasted 30 rooms, including a ballroom. Outbuildings and other improvements included a water tower, a lagoon for his steam yachts, a guesthouse, a boathouse and an ice house. The castle on Calumet Island was among the first such grand structures in the Thousand Islands region, predating the still-standing Boldt Castle, for which construction began in 1900, but built several years after the completion of Castle Rest in 1888.

Emery's second wife died on his birthday on July 20, 1907; in accordance to her wishes, she was allowed to pass away at the castle. Afterwards, Emery locked the castle door for good. Charles Emery died in 1915, leaving the $4 million estate to his son Frank and grandson Charles G. Emery II.

The castle remained vacant until a fire destroyed much of the structure in 1956. Today, all that remains is the water tower (which has been converted to a light house), ice house, power house, skiff house, servant's house, boat house, and the staircase that led up to the castle.

In the 1960s and early 1970s, Calumet Island was the site of the Calumet Island Marina, and included a restaurant and bar as well. As of 2011, the island is owned by the Rawson family who use it for summer holidays.
