= Holland Library =

- U.S. National Register of Historic Places
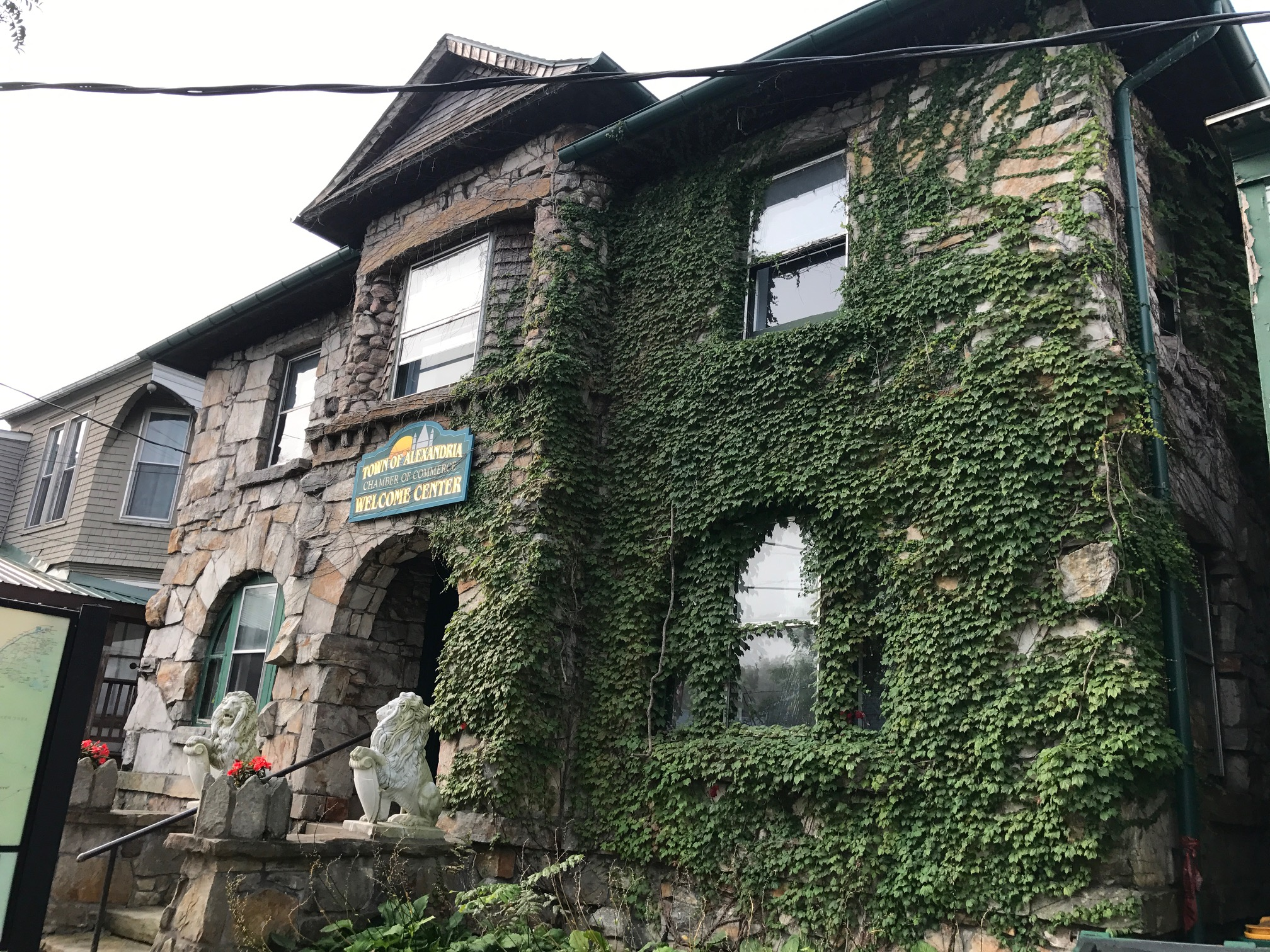

- Location within New York Location within the United States
- Location: 7 Market St., Alexandria Bay, New York
- Coordinates: 44°20′11″N 75°55′6″W
- Area: less than one acre
- Built: 1899
- Architect: Reed, J.B.
- Architectural style: Romanesque
- NRHP reference No.: 02001330
- Added to NRHP: November 15, 2002

Holland Library, now home to Alexandria Bay Chamber of Commerce, is a historic library building located at Alexandria Bay in Jefferson County, New York. It was built in 1899, named to honor Josiah Gilbert Holland, and is a 40-by-44-foot (12 by 13 m), two story, hipped roof building designed in a vernacular interpretation of the Richardsonian Romanesque style. It is constructed of Theresa-Alexandria Bay red sandstone. It served as a library until 1998, when it was occupied by the Chamber of Commerce.

It was listed on the National Register of Historic Places in 2002. The original library was founded and built by Dr. Josiah G. Holland, a noted author who was a seasonal resident of Alexandria Bay. The library was housed in the Westcott Block, which burned down in 1894, and funds for the new one were raised.
