= Cornwall Brothers' Store =

Historic commercial building in New York, United States

- U.S. National Register of Historic Places
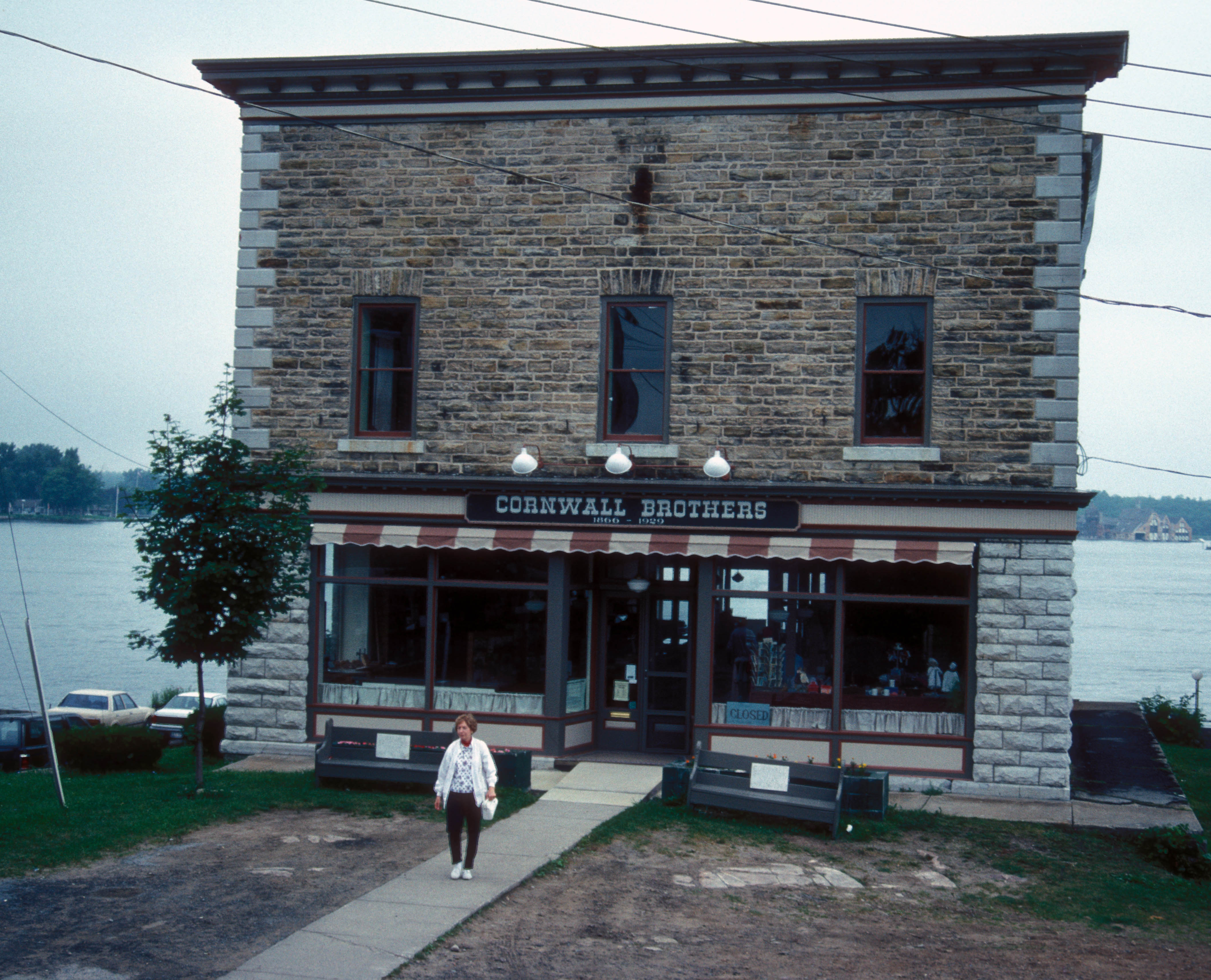

- Location within New York Location within the United States
- Location: 2 Howell Pl., Alexandria Bay, New York
- Coordinates: 44°20′17″N 75°55′11″W
- Area: less than one acre
- Built: 1866
- Architect: Cornwall, Andrew; Walton, John
- NRHP reference No.: 75001191
- Added to NRHP: May 2, 1975

Cornwall Brothers' Store is a historic commercial building located at Alexandria Bay in Jefferson County, New York. It was built in 1866 and is a massive 2- to 2 1/2-story, three-by-seven-bay, structure built of coursed rubble stone. It was originally built as a store, but since the 1930s has been used for a variety of federal purposes, including the Alexandria Bay Post Office, the U.S. Customs and Immigration offices, and U.S. Coast Guard offices.

It was listed on the National Register of Historic Places in 1975.

The building now serves as a non-profit museum showcasing Alexandria Bay and North Country NY history. Entry is free to the public.

== Gallery ==
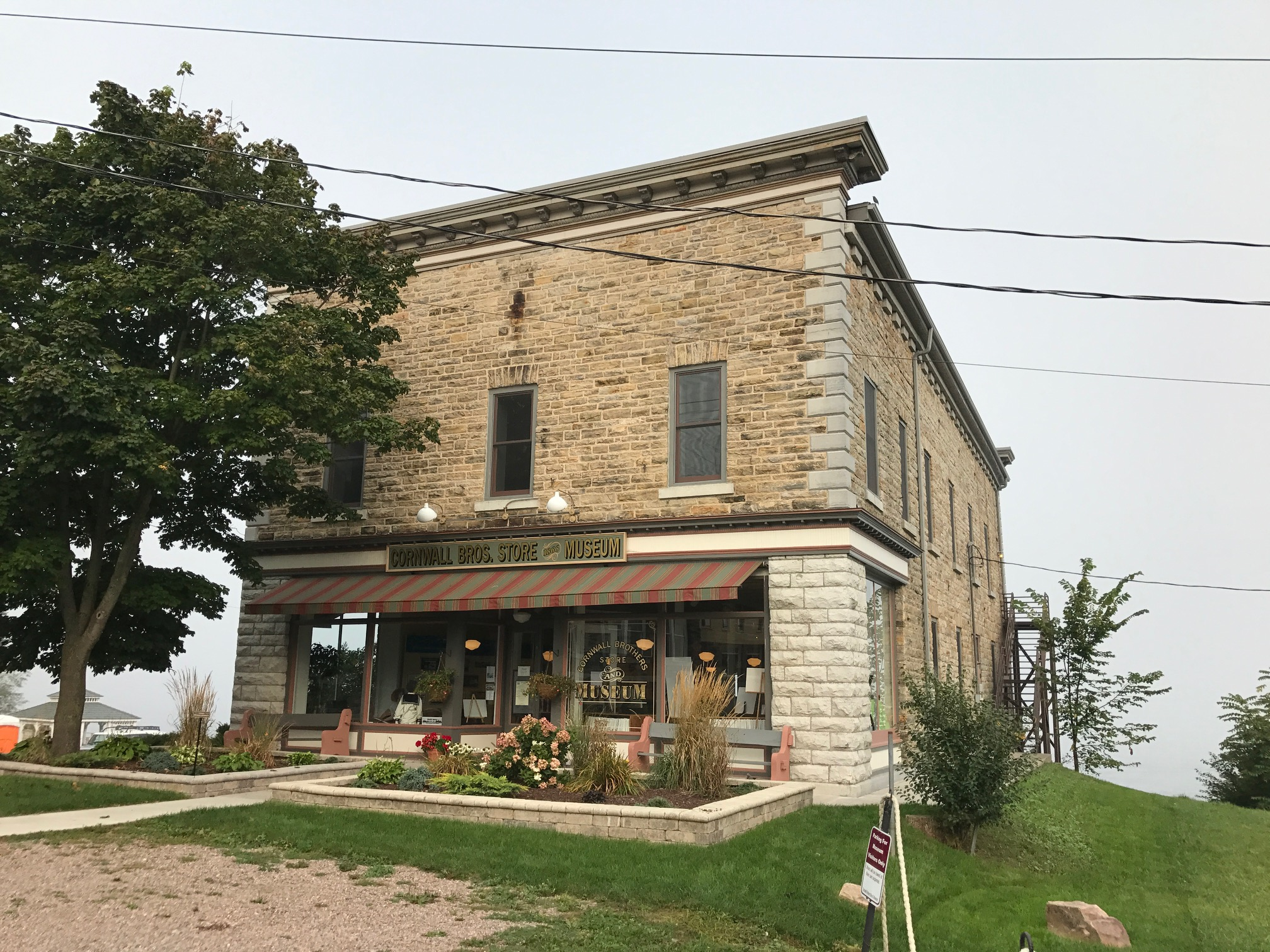
Cornwall Brothers' Store, 2017
