= Keewaydin State Park =

State park in New York, United States

- Location within New York
- Type: State park
- Location: 46165 NYS Route 12; Alexandria Bay, New York
- Coordinates: 44°19′N 75°56′W
- Area: 282 acres (1.14 km^{2})
- Created: 1962
- Operator: New York State Office of Parks, Recreation and Historic Preservation
- Visitors: 55,749 (in 2014)
- Open: All year
- Camp sites: 48
- Website: Keewaydin State Park

Keewaydin State Park is a 282-acre (1.14 km^{2}) state park in the Town of Alexandria in Jefferson County, New York in the United States. The park is located along the St. Lawrence River, southwest of the Village of Alexandria Bay on New York State Route 12.

Open year-round, the park offers a swimming pool and showers, picnic tables, a playground, a campground with 48 campsites, fishing and ice fishing, cross-country skiing, and a boat launch.

== See also ==
- List of New York state parks
