= Densmore Methodist Church of the Thousand Islands =

Historic church in New York, United States

- U.S. National Register of Historic Places
- Location within New York Location within the United States
- Location: Rt. 100 at Densmore Bay, Alexandria, New York
- Coordinates: 44°19′19″N 75°57′15″W
- Area: less than one acre
- Built: 1900
- Architectural style: Shingle Style
- NRHP reference No.: 88000591
- Added to NRHP: May 19, 1988

Densmore Methodist Church of the Thousand Islands is a historic Methodist church located at Alexandria in Jefferson County, New York. It was built in 1900 and consists of a square block with an engaged round corner bell tower in the Shingle Style. The interior feature an Akron plan layout. It was built to serve the year round and seasonal populations of Wellesley Island.

It was listed on the National Register of Historic Places in 1988.
