= Clear Lake (New York) =

- Location within New York Clear Lake (the United States)
- Location: Jefferson County, New York, United States
- Coordinates: 44°16′41″N 75°49′35″W
- Type: Lake
- Basin countries: United States
- Surface area: 165 acres (0.67 km^{2})
- Average depth: 24 feet (7.3 m)
- Max. depth: 44 feet (13 m)
- Shore length^{1}: 2.8 miles (4.5 km)
- Surface elevation: 354 feet (108 m)
- Islands: 1
- Settlements: Plessis, New York
- ^{1} Shore length is not a well-defined measure.

Clear Lake is located near Plessis, New York. Fish species present in the lake are largemouth bass, smallmouth bass, northern pike, walleye, yellow perch, black bullhead, bluegill, and black crappie. There is a boat launch on the west shore on Clear Lake Road.
