= Church of Saint Lawrence =

Historic church in New York, United States

- U.S. National Register of Historic Places
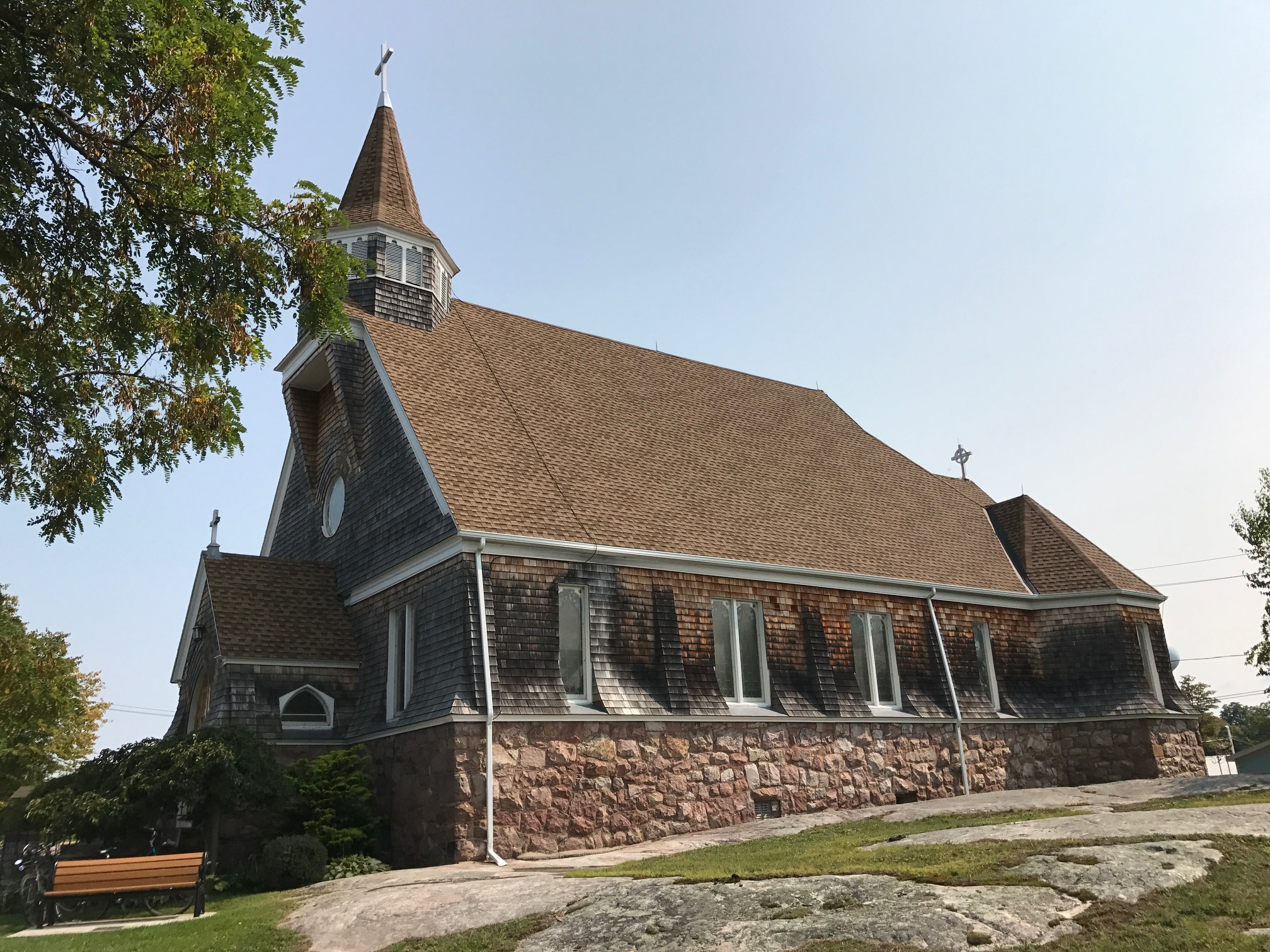

- Location within New York Location within the United States
- Location: 7 Fuller Street, Alexandria Bay, New York
- Coordinates: 44°20′11″N 75°55′17″W
- Area: less than one acre
- Built: 1889
- Architect: William P. Wentworth; Albert Bachman
- Architectural style: Shingle Style
- MPS: Historic Churches of the Episcopal Diocese of Central New York MPS
- NRHP reference No.: 97000442
- Added to NRHP: May 16, 1997

Church of Saint Lawrence is a historic Episcopal church located at Alexandria Bay in Jefferson County, New York. It was built in 1889 and is a three-by-four-bay wood-frame Shingle Style structure on a massive, raised stone foundation. It is composed of an entry porch, nave and chancel with symmetrical, octagonal ells housing organ pipes on the west and sacristy on the east.

It was listed on the National Register of Historic Places in 1997.
