= George C. Boldt Yacht House =

- U.S. National Register of Historic Places
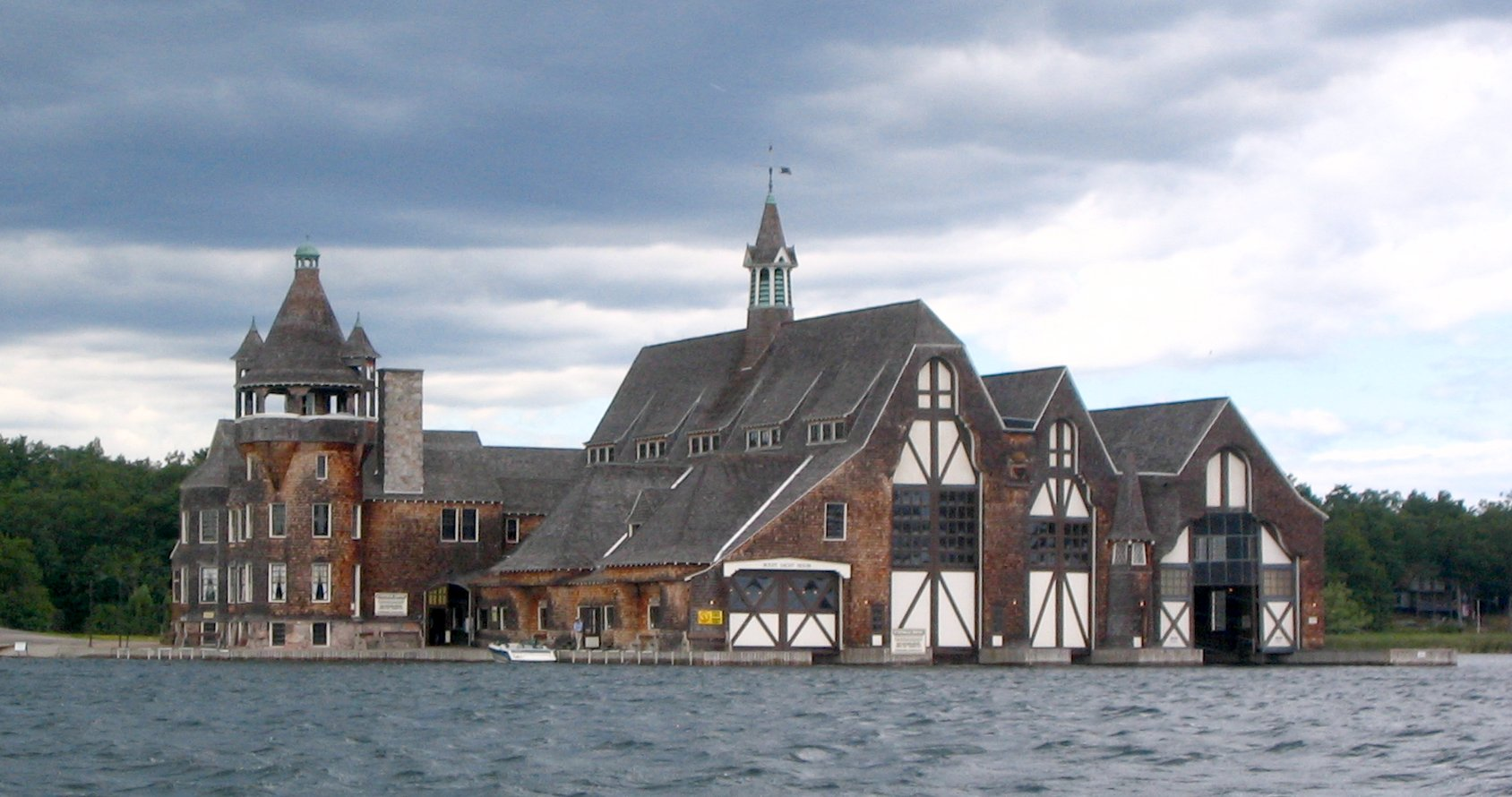
- George C. Boldt Yacht House, August 2006

- Location within New York
- Location: 22320 Boathouse Rd, Wellesley Island, NY 13640
- Nearest city: Alexandria Bay, New York
- Coordinates: 44°20′47″N 75°55′37″W
- Area: 1 acre (0.40 ha)
- Built: 1903
- Architect: G. W. & W. D. Hewitt
- Architectural style: Shingle Style, Eclectic
- NRHP reference No.: 78001853
- Added to NRHP: April 26, 1978

George C. Boldt Yacht House is a historic yacht house located on the northeast shore of Wellesley Island near Alexandria Bay in Jefferson County, New York. It was commissioned by George Boldt to house the many watercraft he owned and is adjacent to Boldt Castle.

The yacht house was designed by the Philadelphia architects G. W. & W. D. Hewitt and built in 1903. It is a massive, eclectic, Shingle-style structure composed of five elements, which are:

- a circular tower containing reception rooms,
- a central group of three yacht bays,
- a large east yacht bay,
- a combination office and storage wing with a crenelated tower, and
- a large caretaker's residence.

The yacht house was listed on the National Register of Historic Places in 1978. On display in the yacht house is the steam yacht Kestrel, as well as various other vintage boats, a number of which are on loan from the Antique Boat Museum in Clayton, New York.

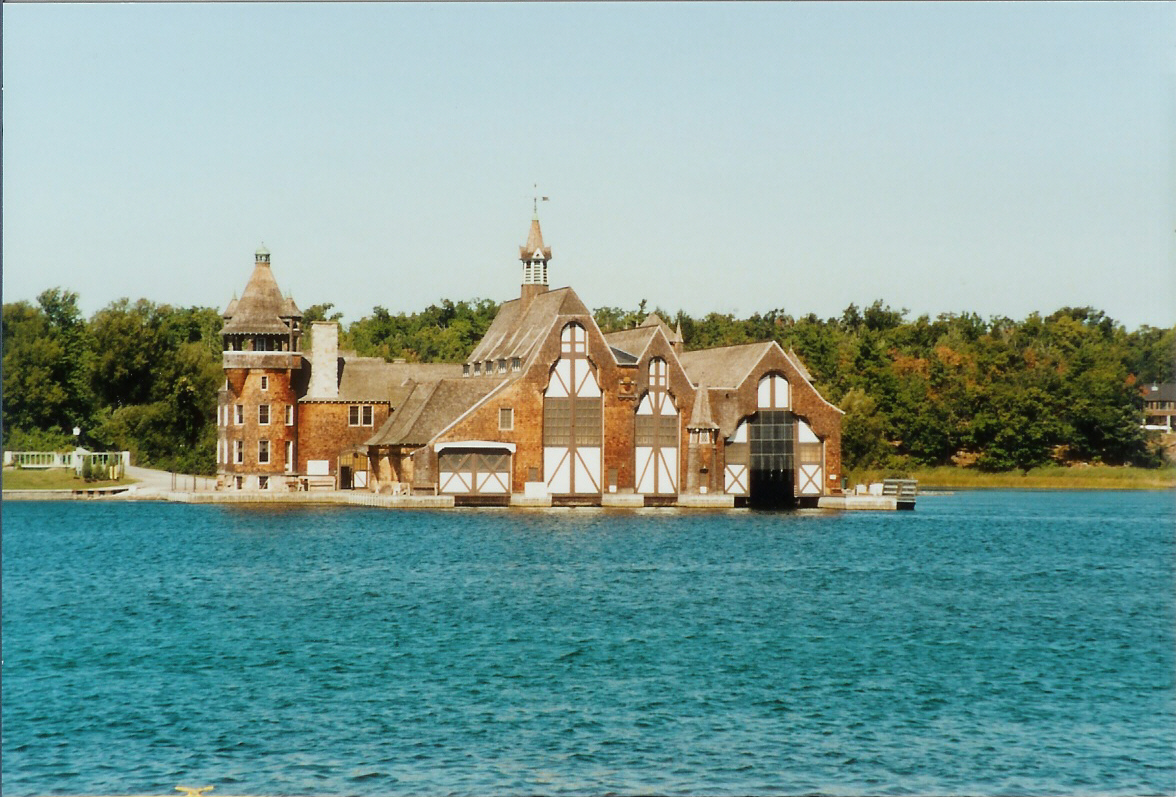
Yacht House in 2001

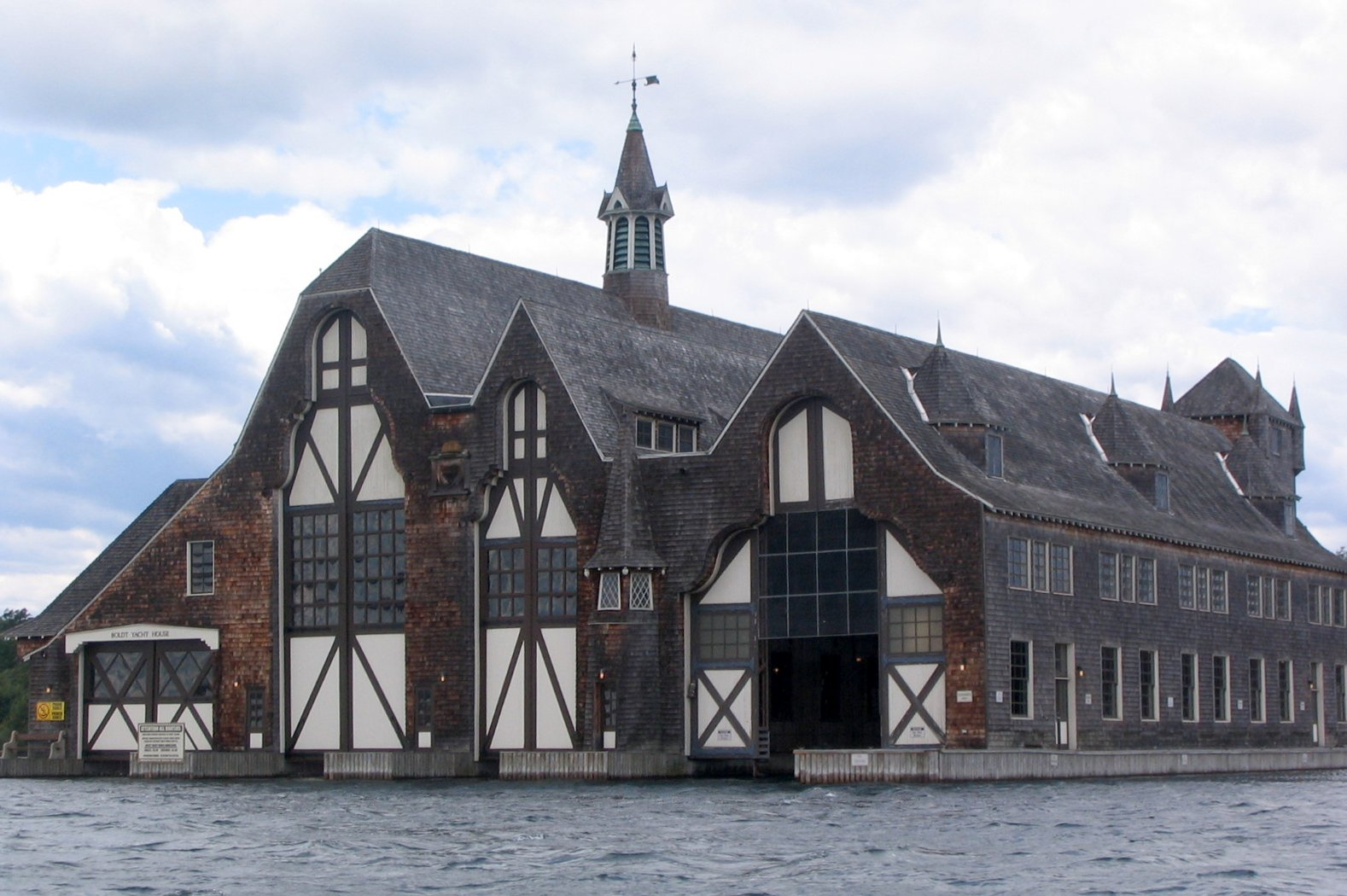
Yacht House in 2006

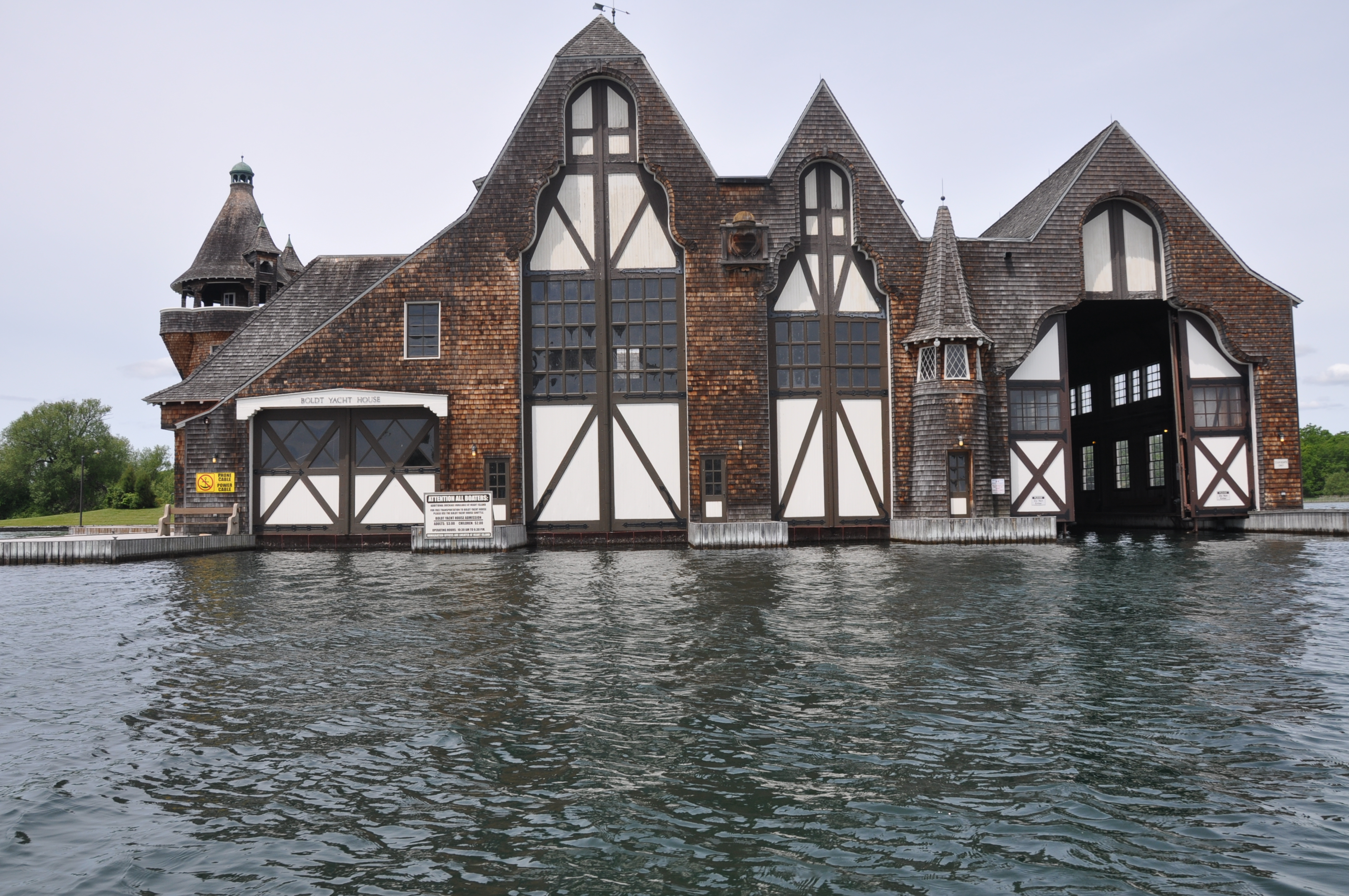
Yacht House in 2016
