= Ingleside (Alexandria Bay, New York) =

Historic house in New York, United States

- U.S. National Register of Historic Places
- Location within New York Location within the United States
- Nearest city: Alexandria Bay, New York
- Coordinates: 44°19′58″N 75°55′40″W
- Area: 4 acres (1.6 ha)
- Built: ca. 1900
- Architectural style: Queen Anne, Shingle Style
- NRHP reference No.: 80002622
- Added to NRHP: April 16, 1980

Ingleside is a historic home located at Alexandria Bay in Jefferson County, New York. It is a large frame and stone residence built about 1900 in an eclectic Shingle style. It is a 2 1/2-story summer home. Also on the property is an icehouse, combined boathouse / guesthouse, private island, square gazebo, terraced pool, and pumphouse with observation deck.

It was listed on the National Register of Historic Places in 1980.
