= Medfield State Hospital =

Historical hospital in Massachusetts

- Commonwealth of Massachusetts

Geography
- Location: Medfield, Massachusetts, United States
- Coordinates: 42°12′48″N 71°20′10″W

History
- Former name: Medfield Insane Asylum
- Constructed: 1892
- Opened: 1892
- Closed: 2003

Links
- Lists: Hospitals in Massachusetts
- Medfield State Hospital
- U.S. National Register of Historic Places
- U.S. Historic district
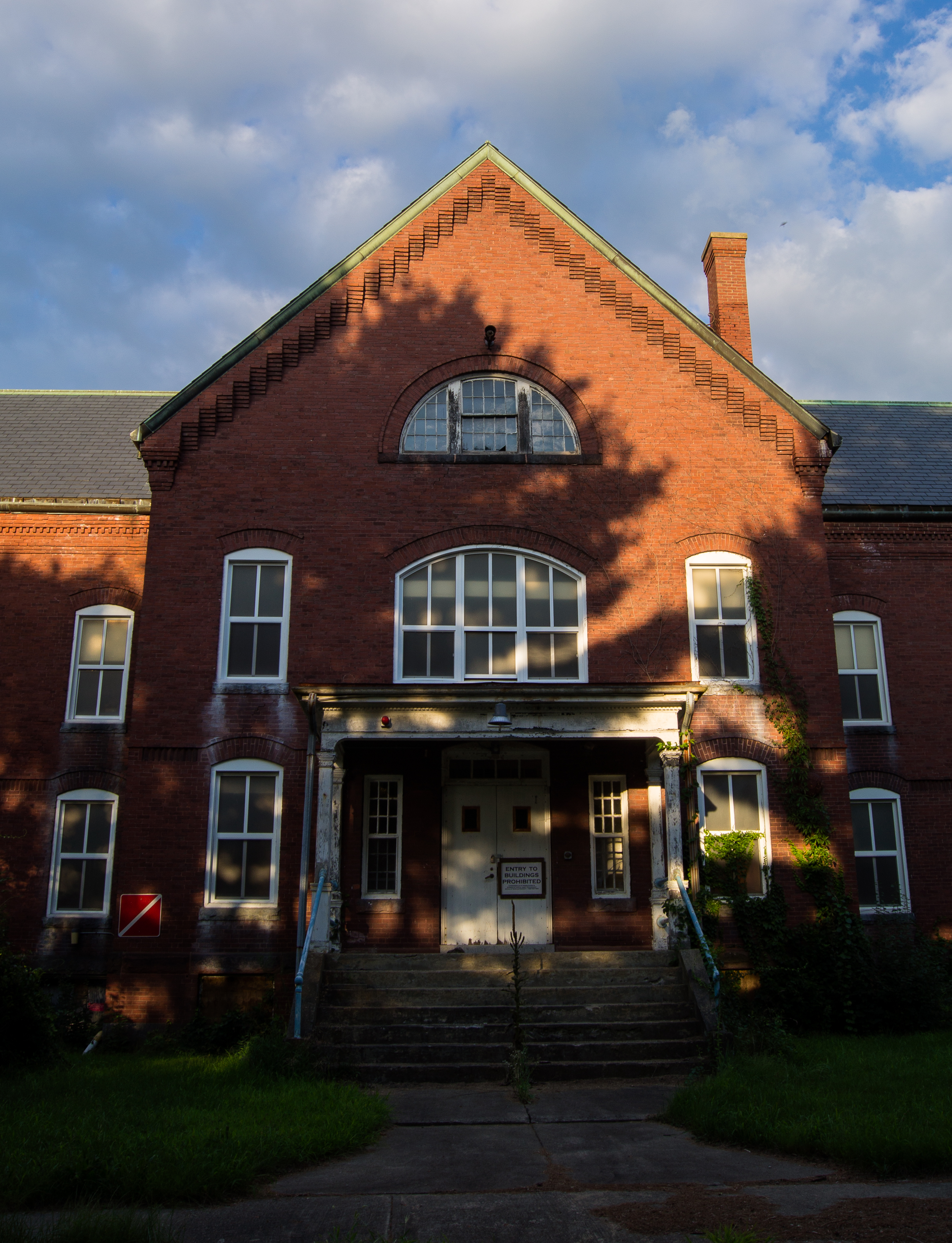
- Former AIT Building at Medfield.

- Location within Massachusetts Location within the United States
- Location: Medfield, Massachusetts
- Built: 1892
- Architect: William Pitt Wentworth; Shepley, Rutan and Coolidge
- Architectural style: Greek Revival, Queen Anne, Beaux Arts
- MPS: Massachusetts State Hospitals And State Schools MPS
- NRHP reference No.: 93001481
- Added to NRHP: January 21, 1994

Medfield State Hospital, originally the Medfield Insane Asylum, is a historic former psychiatric hospital complex at 45 Hospital Road in Medfield, Massachusetts. The asylum was established in 1892 as the state's first facility for dealing with chronic mental patients. The college-like campus was designed by William Pitt Wentworth and developed between 1896 and 1914, after an era dominated by asylums built using the Kirkbride Plan. Medfield Insane Asylum was the first asylum built using the new Cottage Plan layout, where patients were integrated into a small community to work a specific job, rather than being confined to cells. It was formally renamed "Medfield State Hospital" in 1914.

The complex included 58 buildings at its height on a property of some 1.4 sq mi (3.6 km^{2}), and a capacity of 2,200 patients. It raised its own livestock and produce, and generated its own heat, light, and power. It was added to the National Register of Historic Places in 1994, but the property was closed in April 2003 and the buildings were shuttered with the exception of a building at the rear of the campus which was occupied by the State Parole Board until 2006. The grounds have been restored and opened to the public and are open every day from sun up to sundown. It has been used as a filming location for thriller and horror motion pictures such as The New Mutants (2020), Shutter Island (2010), and The Box (2009). The Clark Building was demolished in 2012. Local Medfield Police now patrol the facility. Trespassing is strictly forbidden past dark.

Because of the hospital's long history and the large number of patient deaths that occurred on the property during its years of operation, the site has become associated with local legends, ghost stories, and reports of paranormal activity. Paranormal investigators, podcasts, and online media sources have described alleged ghost sightings and unexplained activity within several of the abandoned buildings, including reports of whispers, apparitions, and the so called infamous “Weeping Woman” legend connected to the hospital grounds. The property has also experienced repeated incidents of trespassing and vandalism involving unauthorized visitors entering restricted sections of the campus after dark. In 2011, five teenagers were charged with trespassing and breaking and entering after allegedly entering the basement of one of the abandoned hospital buildings at night after learning online that the property was believed to be haunted. Local Medfield police regularly patrol the grounds, and trespassing is strictly forbidden past dark because of the unsafe condition of many of the buildings.

Within the grounds of the hospital lies the Medfield State Hospital Cemetery which has 841 gravesites. This cemetery was opened from 1918 until 1988. Only numbers were on the graves until 2005, when a Boy Scout from Troop 89 made it his Eagle Scout service project to find the names and dates of death of all those buried in the cemetery.

The Odyssey House, the Carriage House, and the Laundry Building were demolished in 2013.

== See also ==
- National Register of Historic Places listings in Norfolk County, Massachusetts
