= Castle Rest =

Castle in New Jersey, United States

Coordinates: 44.334393°N 75.933504°W

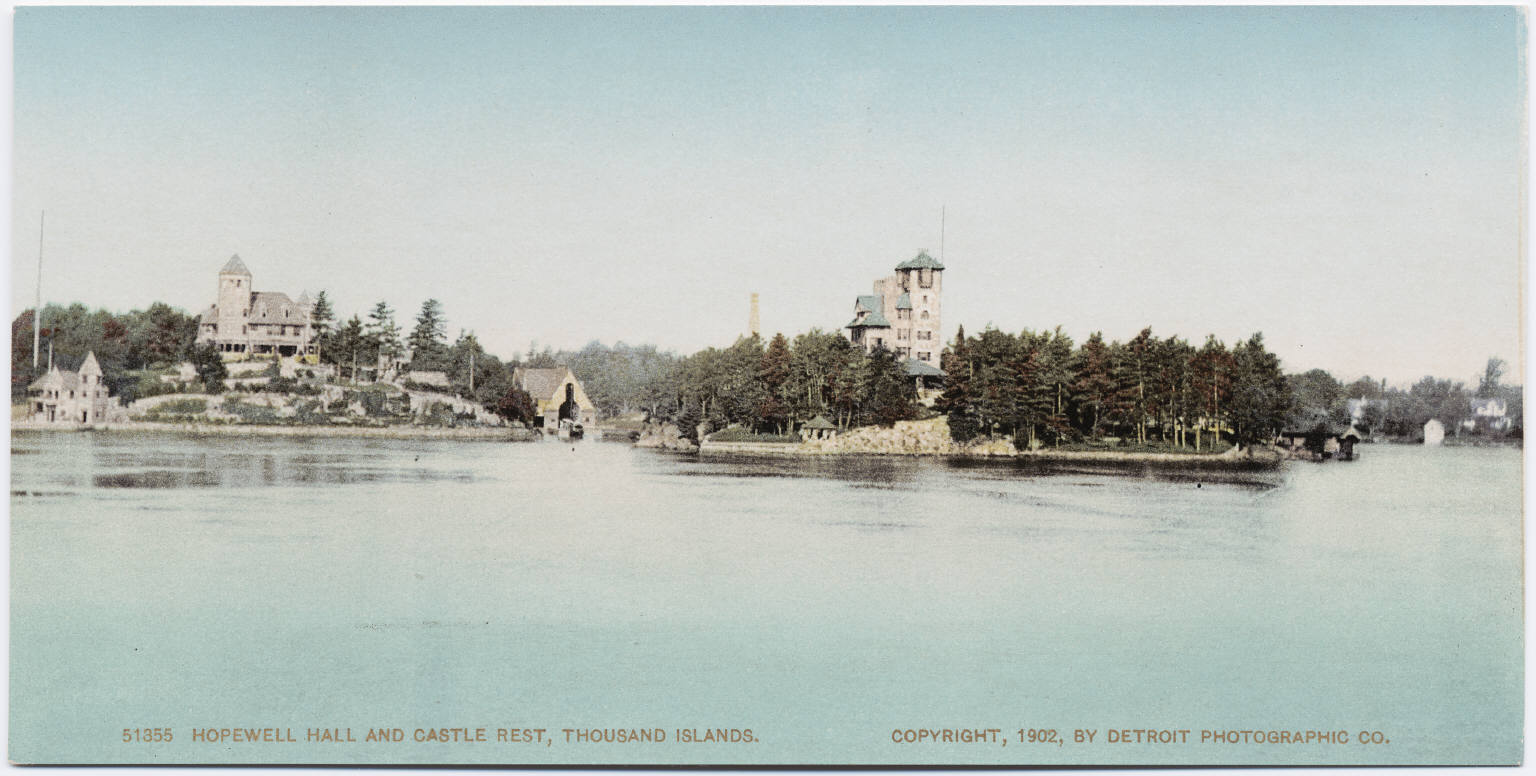

Castle Rest was the first of several "castles" built in the Thousand Islands region during the late 19th and early 20th centuries. The castle was built in 1888 for George M. Pullman, and was a distinctive architectural work of Solon Spencer Beman. It remained in the Pullman-Lowden family until the mid-twentieth century when the main structure was demolished. Ancillary buildings designed by Beman remain on the island.

The castle was located on Pullman Island in the Town of Alexandria, Jefferson County, New York.
