= Alexandria Bay, New York =

Village in the United States

- Village
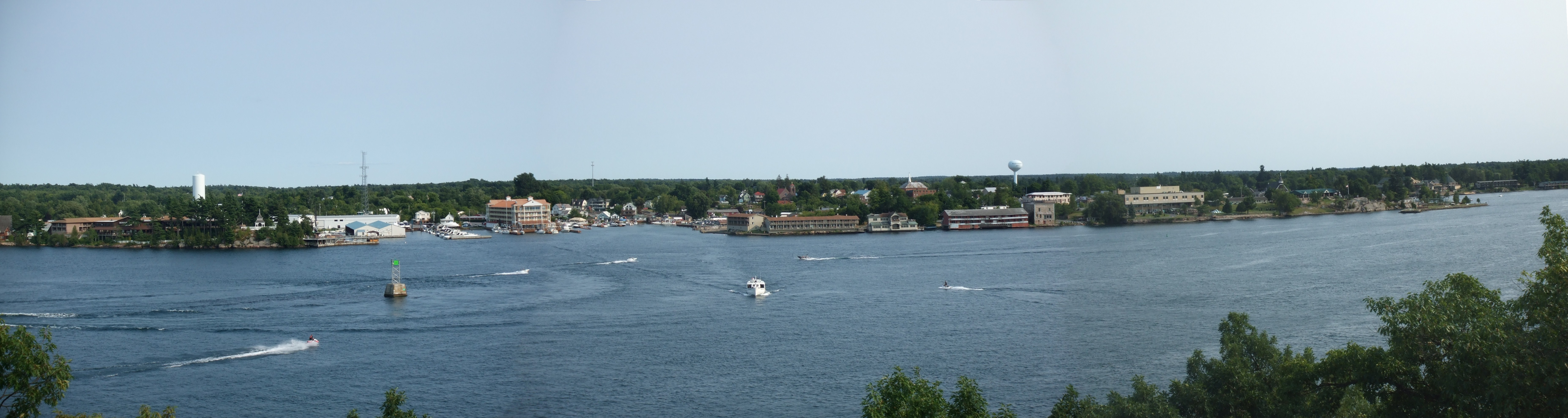
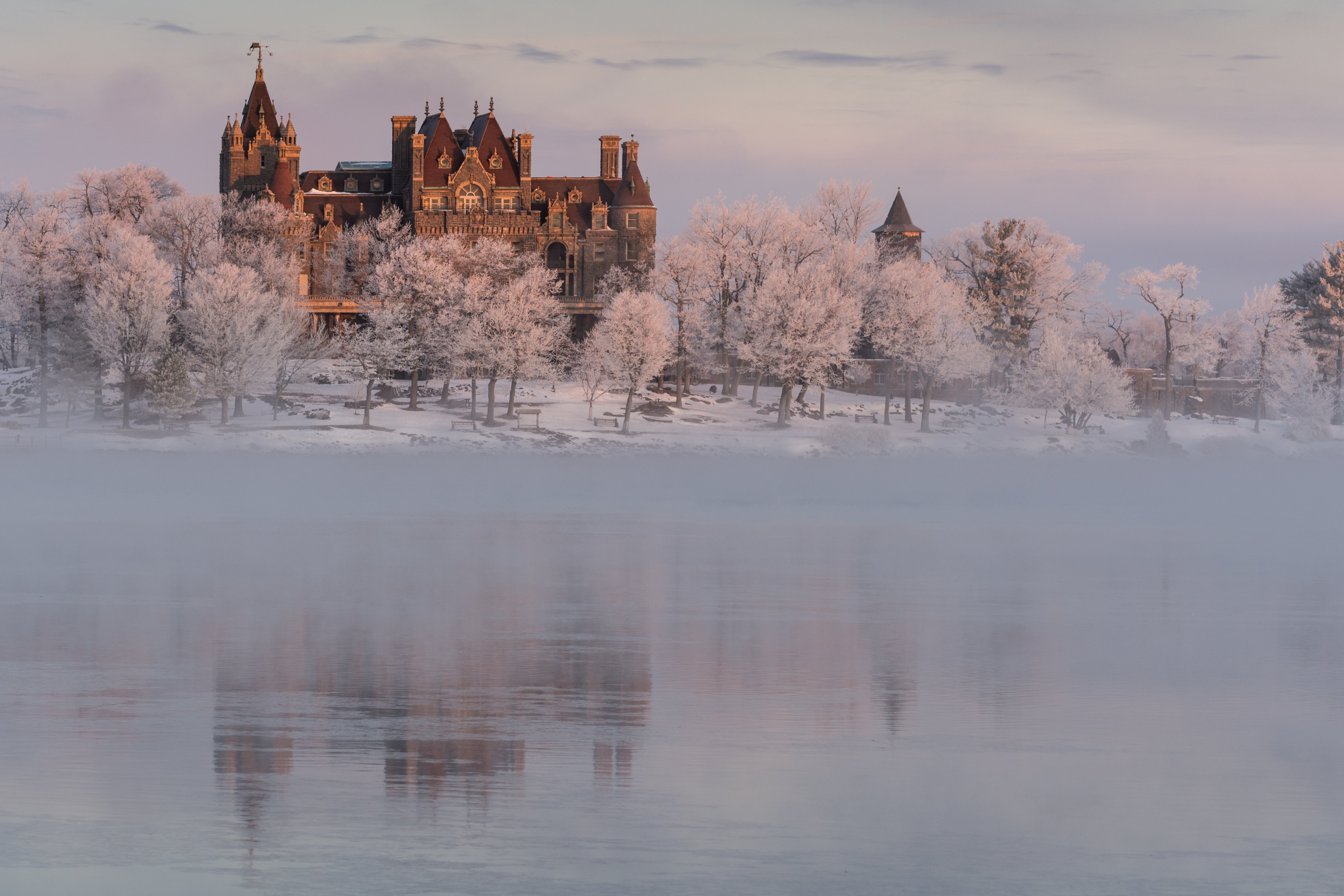
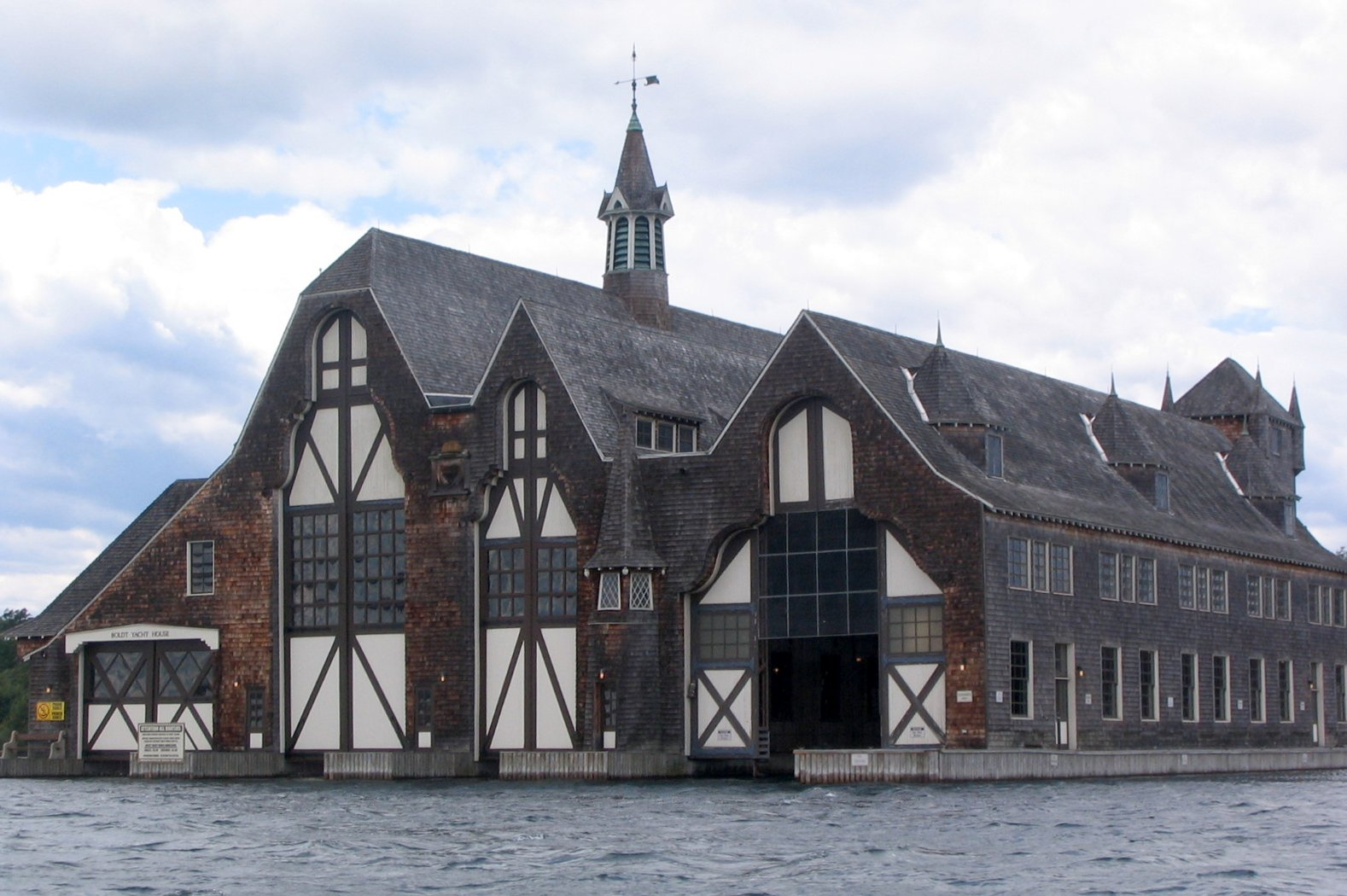
- Left to right from top: panorama of Alexandria Bay, Boldt Castle, Tour Boat passing Longue Vue Island, George C. Boldt Yacht House
- Motto: "Heart of the Thousand Islands"
- Location within New York Location within the United States
- Coordinates: 44°20′9″N 75°54′53″W
- Country: United States
- State: New York
- Region: The Thousand Islands (New York)
- County: Jefferson
- Town: Alexandria

Area
  - Total: 1.51 sq mi (3.90 km^{2})
  - Land: 0.75 sq mi (1.94 km^{2})
  - Water: 0.76 sq mi (1.96 km^{2})
- Elevation: 284 ft (87 m)

Population (2020)
  - Total: 924
  - Density: 1,233.1/sq mi (476.12/km^{2})
- Time zone: UTC-5 (Eastern (EST))
  - Summer (DST): UTC-4 (EDT)
- ZIP code: 13607
- Area code: 315
- FIPS code: 36-01187
- GNIS feature ID: 0942309
- Website: www.villageofalexandriabay.com

Alexandria Bay is a village in Jefferson County, New York, United States, within the town of Alexandria. It is located in the Thousand Islands region of northern New York. As of the 2020 census, Alexandria Bay had a population of 924. It lies near the Thousand Islands Border Crossing of Canada and the United States.

== History ==
Settlement began around 1817. By 1836, the community had about 25 dwellings.

The George C. Boldt Yacht House, Church of Saint Lawrence, Cornwall Brothers' Store, Holland Library, Ingleside, and Longue Vue Island are listed on the National Register of Historic Places.

The Battle of Cranberry Creek was fought nearby in 1813 during the War of 1812.

In its heyday as a late 19th century and early 20th century resort, its main access was via steamer from Clayton, NY. Its nearest rail connection was Redwood on the Rome, Watertown and Ogdensburg Railroad's Rochester line bound for Ogdensburg.

== Geography ==
According to the United States Census Bureau, the village has a total area of 1.53 square miles (3.95 km^{2}), of which 0.76 square miles (1.98 km^{2}) are land and 0.76 square miles (1.97 km^{2}), or 49.77%, are water. The village is located on the south bank of the Saint Lawrence River near the U.S. and Canada international border. Keewaydin State Park is southwest of the village.

New York State Route 12 and New York State Route 26 intersect at the only stoplight in the village. NY-12 leads northeast (downriver) 36 miles (58 km) to Ogdensburg and southwest 11 miles (18 km) to Clayton. NY-26 has its northern terminus at Alexandria Bay and leads southeast 11 miles (18 km) to Theresa. Interstate 81 intersects NY-12 4 miles (6.4 km) southwest of Alexandria Bay, leading south 25 miles (40 km) to Watertown and 94 miles (151 km) to Syracuse, and north to the Thousand Islands Bridge into Canada.

== Buildings ==
The village has a number of properties on the National Register of Historic Places.

=== Historic Sites ===
The following are the historic sites in Alexandria Bay of such significance as to be listed on the National Register of Historic Places.

	Site Name	Image	Location	Comment
1	Cornwall Brothers' Store		2 Howell Place	Added to the National Register of Historic Places, May 2, 1975
2	George C. Boldt Yacht House		22320 Boathouse Road	Added to the National Register of Historic Places, April 26, 1978
3	Ingleside		Cherry Island, Alexandria Bay	Added to the National Register of Historic Places, April 16, 1980
4	Longue Vue Island		Longue Vue Island, Alexandria Bay	Added to the National Register of Historic Places, November 4, 1982
5	Church of Saint Lawrence		7 Fuller Street	Added to the National Register of Historic Places, May 16, 1997
6	Holland Library		7 Market Street	Added to the National Register of Historic Places, November 15, 2002

== Demographics ==
Historical population
Census	Pop.	Note	%±
1860	120		—
1880	587		—
1890	1,123		91.3%
1900	1,511		34.6%
1910	1,899		25.7%
1920	1,649		−13.2%
1930	1,952		18.4%
1940	1,748		−10.5%
1950	1,688		−3.4%
1960	1,583		−6.2%
1970	1,440		−9.0%
1980	1,265		−12.2%
1990	1,194		−5.6%
2000	1,088		−8.9%
2010	1,078		−0.9%
2020	924		−14.3%
U.S. Decennial Census

As of the census of 2000, there were 1,088 people, 482 households, and 270 families residing in the village. The population density was 1,473.9 inhabitants per square mile (569.1/km^{2}). There were 624 housing units at an average density of 845.3 per square mile (326.4/km^{2}). The racial makeup of the village was 99.08% White, 0.37% Hispanic or Latino of any race, 0.09% African American, 0.09% Native American, and 0.74% from two or more races.

There were 482 households, out of which 24.7% had children under the age of 18 living with them, 38.4% were married couples living together, 14.9% had a female householder with no husband present, and 43.8% were non-families. 38.6% of all households were made up of individuals, and 15.8% had someone living alone who was 65 years of age or older. The average household size was 2.12 and the average family size was 2.81.

In the village, the population was spread out, with 20.3% under the age of 18, 5.3% from 18 to 24, 27.7% from 25 to 44, 23.4% from 45 to 64, and 23.3% who were 65 years of age or older. The median age was 43 years. For every 100 females, there were 80.7 males. For every 100 females age 18 and over, there were 79.9 males.

The median income for a household in the village was $29,338, and the median income for a family was $36,979. Males had a median income of $31,250 versus $21,429 for females. The per capita income for the village was $16,875. About 11.0% of families and 13.5% of the population were below the poverty line, including 16.3% of those under age 18 and 18.7% of those age 65 or over.

According to the 2008-2012 American Community Survey, the total population of Alexandria Bay was 1,999 and 95.5% white. 12.6% of the population over 25 does not have a high school or equivalent degree. Median household income, in 2012 inflation adjusted dollars, was $37,303.

== Local attractions ==
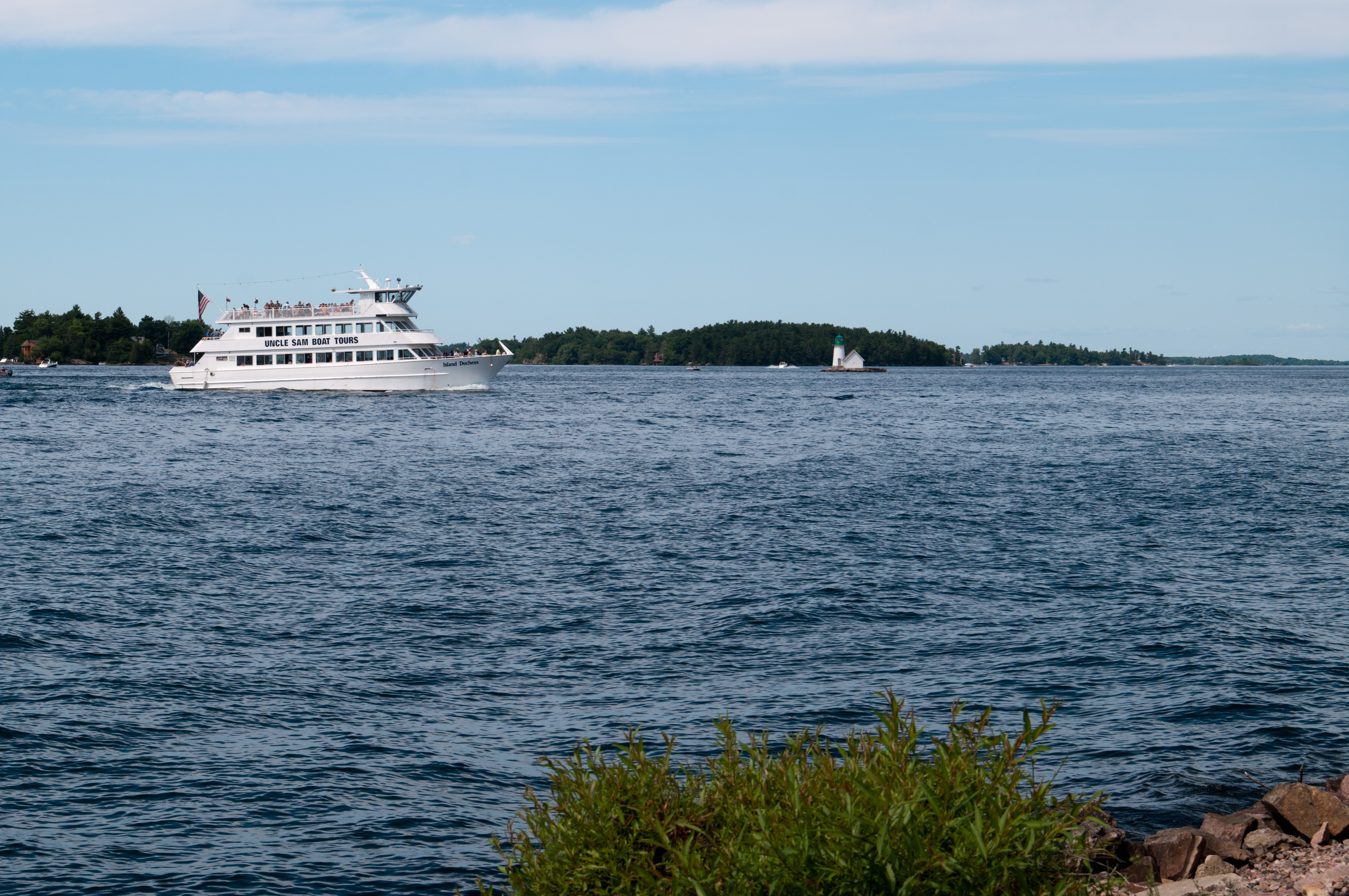
Tour boat on the Saint Lawrence River

While Alexandria Bay has a relatively low population during the winter months and has no colleges, the late spring, summer, and early fall seasons bring an influx of vacationers and avid boaters that cause the population of the village to exceed 15,000. Several motels and hotels are available in the immediate village area. Boat tours are available of the bay and river area daily.

Boldt Castle is a 120-room mansion on Heart Island, located near Alexandria Bay. The castle was designed by the firm of W. D. Hewitt and G.W. Hewitt, Architects of Philadelphia, who also designed Druim Moir Castle in Philadelphia. Boldt Castle was built at the turn of the century by multi-millionaire George C. Boldt for his wife, Louise, as a testimony of his love for her. Mr. Boldt invested over $2.5 million to build this replica of a Rhineland castle.

Boldt planned on presenting it to his wife on Valentine's Day. Work was underway on the eleven buildings that would comprise the castle complex when in January 1904 Louise Boldt died, ending the dreams of a lifetime. George Boldt ordered that all work be stopped and for 73 years the Castle and the other structures on the island were left to the forces of nature. The Thousand Islands Bridge Authority acquired the property in 1977; since that time, several million dollars have been spent rehabilitating and restoring the castle and surrounding structures. Ferries allow access to the castle on an hourly schedule daily. In 1979, the movie Fear No Evil was filmed at several sites in and around Boldt Castle, marking the only time the castle has made an appearance in cinema.

Every August, 10 days are devoted to "Bill Johnston's Pirate Days", a town-wide festival that features professional performers acting out pirate battles and a "siege" of the town by the "Pirate of the Thousand Islands", Bill Johnston, whom the festival is named after. It is encouraged that attendees dress in pirate attire, as do the actors who line the streets. The festival is also educational, with many groups providing galleries, displays, and informative presentations of the weapons and ships used during the Golden Age of Piracy.

== Economy ==
The total value of exports of Alexandria Bay, New York was $6.73 billion in 2020.

== Airport ==
Maxson Airfield (FAA LID: 89NY) is a privately owned, private-use general aviation airport located two nautical miles (3.7 km; 2.3 mi) south of the central business district of Alexandria Bay. It once had commercial service provided by Mohawk Airlines. At that time, the airport bore the IATA airport code AXB.

The Maxson Airport was originally owned by Howard C. Maxson. He ran it as a grass-field airport until his death in 1984. Howard Maxson would provide airplane tours over the 1000 Islands during the summer as well as flight instruction.

== Education ==
The school district is Alexandria Central School District.
