= Plessis, New York =

- Census-designated place
- Location within New York Location within the United States
- Coordinates: 44°16′13″N 75°51′16″W
- Country: United States
- State: New York
- County: Jefferson
- Town: Alexandria

Area
  - Total: 0.35 sq mi (0.90 km^{2})
  - Land: 0.35 sq mi (0.90 km^{2})
  - Water: 0 sq mi (0.00 km^{2})
- Elevation: 404 ft (123 m)

Population (2020)
  - Total: 126
  - Density: 364.4/sq mi (140.69/km^{2})
- Time zone: UTC-5 (Eastern (EST))
  - Summer (DST): UTC-4 (EDT)
- ZIP Codes: 13675 (Plessis); 13656 (La Fargeville); 13691 (Theresa)
- Area codes: 315 & 680
- GNIS feature ID: 960751

Plessis is a hamlet and census-designated place in the town of Alexandria in Jefferson County, New York, United States. As of the 2020 census, Plessis had a population of 126. Plessis had a post office from September 16, 1823, until March 26, 2011; it still has its own ZIP code, 13675. New York State Route 26 passes through the community.

== Geography ==
According to the U.S. Census Bureau, the community has an area of 0.346 square miles (0.90 km^{2}), all land.

== Education ==
The school district is Alexandria Central School District.

== Demographics ==
Historical population
Census	Pop.	Note	%±
2020	126		—
U.S. Decennial Census
