= Alexandria, New York =

- Town
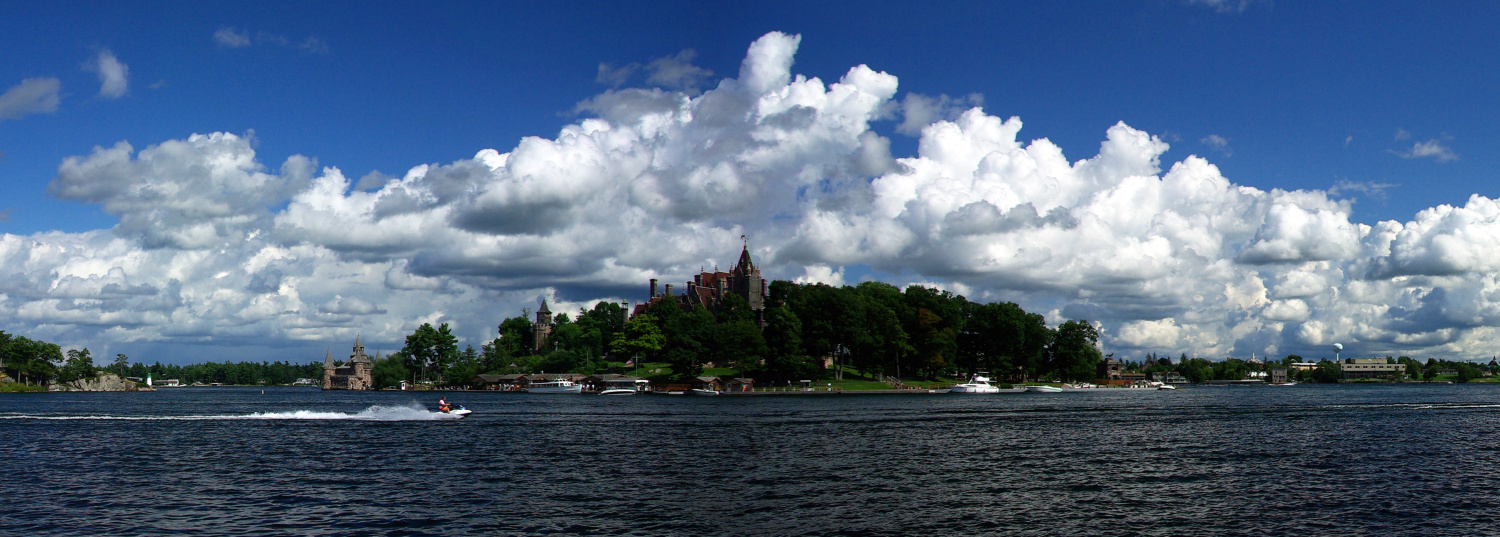
- Boldt Castle on Heart Island in the Thousand Islands archipelago

- Location within New York Location within the United States
- Coordinates: 44°19′N 75°53′W
- Country: United States
- State: New York
- County: Jefferson County
- Incorporated: 1821

Government
  - Mayor: Martha Millett (D) Town Council: Alcid Beaudin (D); James R. Durand (R); Dale D. Hunneyman (R); Douglas G. Williams (R)

Area
  - Total: 84.37 sq mi (218.53 km^{2})
  - Land: 72.56 sq mi (187.94 km^{2})
  - Water: 11.81 sq mi (30.59 km^{2})
- Elevation: 351 ft (107 m)

Population (2020)
  - Total: 3,741
  - Density: 55.4/sq mi (21.38/km^{2})
- Time zone: UTC-5 (EST)
  - Summer (DST): UTC-4 (EDT)
- ZIP Codes: 13607 (Alexandria Bay); 13675 (Plessis); 13640 (Wellesley Island); 13646 (Hammond); 13656 (La Fargeville); 13691 (Theresa)
- Area code: 315
- FIPS code: 36-045-01176
- Website: www.townofalexandriany.gov

Alexandria is a town in the Thousand Islands region of the U.S. state of New York, within Jefferson County. The town's population was 3,741 at the 2020 United States census. The town is named after Alexander LeRay, the son of an early developer. The village of Alexandria Bay is within the town.

Alexandria is in the northern part of the county and is north of Watertown.

== History ==
The first settlement occurred at Alexandria Center around 1811.

The Battle of Cranberry Creek, during the War of 1812, was a minor engagement in which local forces defeated a much larger group of British soldiers and sailors who attempted to regain supplies and provisions taken by the Americans.

The town was established in 1821 from the towns of Brownville and Le Ray.

Modern Alexandria has become a well-known vacation area.

The Densmore Methodist Church of the Thousand Islands was listed on the National Register of Historic Places in 1988.

== Geography ==
According to the United States Census Bureau, the town has an area of 84.6 square miles (219.0 km^{2}), of which 72.7 square miles (188.2 km^{2}) are land and 11.9 square miles (30.8 km^{2}), or 14.07%, are water.

The St. Lawrence River and many of its Thousand Islands occupy the northern part of the town. The northern town line is the international border with Canada and its province of Ontario. The eastern town line is the border with St. Lawrence County.

Interstate 81 passes through the southwestern corner of the town. New York State Route 12 follows the course of the St. Lawrence River. NY-12 intersects New York State Route 26 at Alexandria Bay and runs in a southwesterly direction.

== Demographics ==
Historical population
Census	Pop.	Note	%±
1830	1,523		—
1840	3,475		128.2%
1850	3,178		−8.5%
1860	3,808		19.8%
1870	3,087		−18.9%
1880	3,135		1.6%
1890	3,601		14.9%
1900	3,894		8.1%
1910	4,259		9.4%
1920	3,567		−16.2%
1930	3,953		10.8%
1940	3,533		−10.6%
1950	3,583		1.4%
1960	3,574		−0.3%
1970	3,515		−1.7%
1980	3,587		2.0%
1990	3,949		10.1%
2000	4,097		3.7%
2010	4,061		−0.9%
2020	3,741		−7.9%
U.S. Decennial Census

As of the census of 2000, there were 4,097 people, 1,653 households, and 1,128 families residing in the town. The population density was 56.1 inhabitants per square mile (21.7/km^{2}). There were 3,247 housing units at an average density of 44.5 per square mile (17.2/km^{2}). The town's racial makeup was 98.54% White, 0.29% African American, 0.22% Native American, 0.02% Asian, 0.05% Pacific Islander, 0.17% from other races, and 0.71% from two or more races. Hispanic or Latino of any race were 0.63% of the population.

There were 1,653 households, of which 30.2% had children under the age of 18 living with them, 54.6% were married couples living together, 9.1% had a female householder with no husband present, and 31.7% were non-families. 26.9% of all households were made up of individuals, and 11.4% had someone living alone who was 65 years of age or older. The average household size was 2.44 and the average family size was 2.95.

24.6% of the town's population was under the age of 18, 5.4% was from age 18 to 24, 27.9% was from age 25 to 44, 25.6% was from age 45 to 64, and 16.5% were 65 years of age or older. The median age was 40 years. For every 100 females, there were 96.4 males. For every 100 females age 18 and over, there were 94.5 males.

The town's median household income was $33,333, and the median family income was $42,813. Males had a median income of $30,870 versus $21,050 for females. The town's per capita income was $16,879. About 11.3% of families and 13.6% of the population were below the poverty line, including 17.2% of those under age 18 and 12.2% of those age 65 or over.

== Transportation ==
New York State Route 12 runs northeast–southwest through the town, near the edge of the St. Lawrence River. Interstate 81 runs to the southwest of the town, with its northernmost extent there, before continuing to the international bridge, the Thousand Islands Bridge, across the river to Ontario, Canada. Until 1961 the New York Central Railroad ran trains on its St. Lawrence Division between Ogdensburg and Syracuse, through a station in Redwood on the eastern edge of Alexandria.

== Communities and locations in Alexandria ==
=== Communities and inhabited locations ===
- Alexandria Bay – A village located by the St. Lawrence River on NY-12.
- Alexandria Center – A hamlet south of Alexandria Bay on NY-26.
- Bean Hill Crossing – A hamlet in the northern part of the town on County Road 37
- Browns Corners – A hamlet east of Alexandria Bay on NY-26.
- Collins Landing Wildlife Management Area – A conservation area near the western town line.
- Edgewood Park – A hamlet southwest of Alexandria Bay on Route 12.
- Godfreys Corner – A hamlet southwest of Alexandria Center at County Road 2.
- Goose Bay – A hamlet northeast of Alexandria Bay on NY-12 next to a bay of the St. Lawrence River, also called Goose Bay.
- Keewaydin State Park – A state park southwest of Alexandria Bay on NY-12.
- Kring Point State Park – A state park in the northeastern corner of the town.
- Mary Island State Park – A state park on Mary Island, a small island at the northeast tip of the Wellesley Island.
- Maxson Field (89N) – An airport near Alexandria Bay village; privately owned.
- Pinehurst Resort – A hamlet southwest of Alexandria Bay.
- Plessis – A hamlet and census-designated place near the southern town line on NY-26.
- Redwood – A census-designated place on Route 37 between Mud Lake and Butterfield Lake.
- Point Vivian – A hamlet southwest of Alexandria Bay on NY-12.
- St. Lawrence Park – A southwest of Point Vivian.
- Skinners Corners – A location east of Alexandria Bay on Limestone Road at Center Road.
- Tanners Corners – A location in the southwestern corner of the town on County Road 2.
- Wellesley Island State Park – A state park on Wellesley Island, partly within the town.
- Westminster Park – A hamlet on the northern end of Wellesley Island.

=== Geographical locations ===
- American Narrows – The part of the St. Lawrence River that flows between Wellesley Island and the mainland of New York.
- Black Ash Swamp – A wetland near the western town line.
- Butterfield Lake – A lake on the eastern border of the town.
- Clear Lake – A small lake near the southeastern town line and southwest of Mud Lake.
- Densmore Bay – A bay on the south shore of Wellesley Island.
- Goose Bay – A St. Lawrence River Bay in the northeastern part of Alexandria.
- Ironsides Island – A small island in the St. Lawrence River in northeastern Alexandria.
- Lake of the Isles – A bay in Wellesley Island partly in the northern part of Alexandria.
- Mary Island – A small island in the St. Lawrence River off the northern end of Wellesley Island.
- Mud Lake – A lake near the southeastern town line and northeast of Clear Lake.
- Swan Bay – A bay in the St. Lawrence River in the western part of the town.
- Wellesley Island – A large island in the St. Lawrence River that is divided by three towns of the county.
