= Boldt Castle =

Landmark in Thousand Islands, New York State

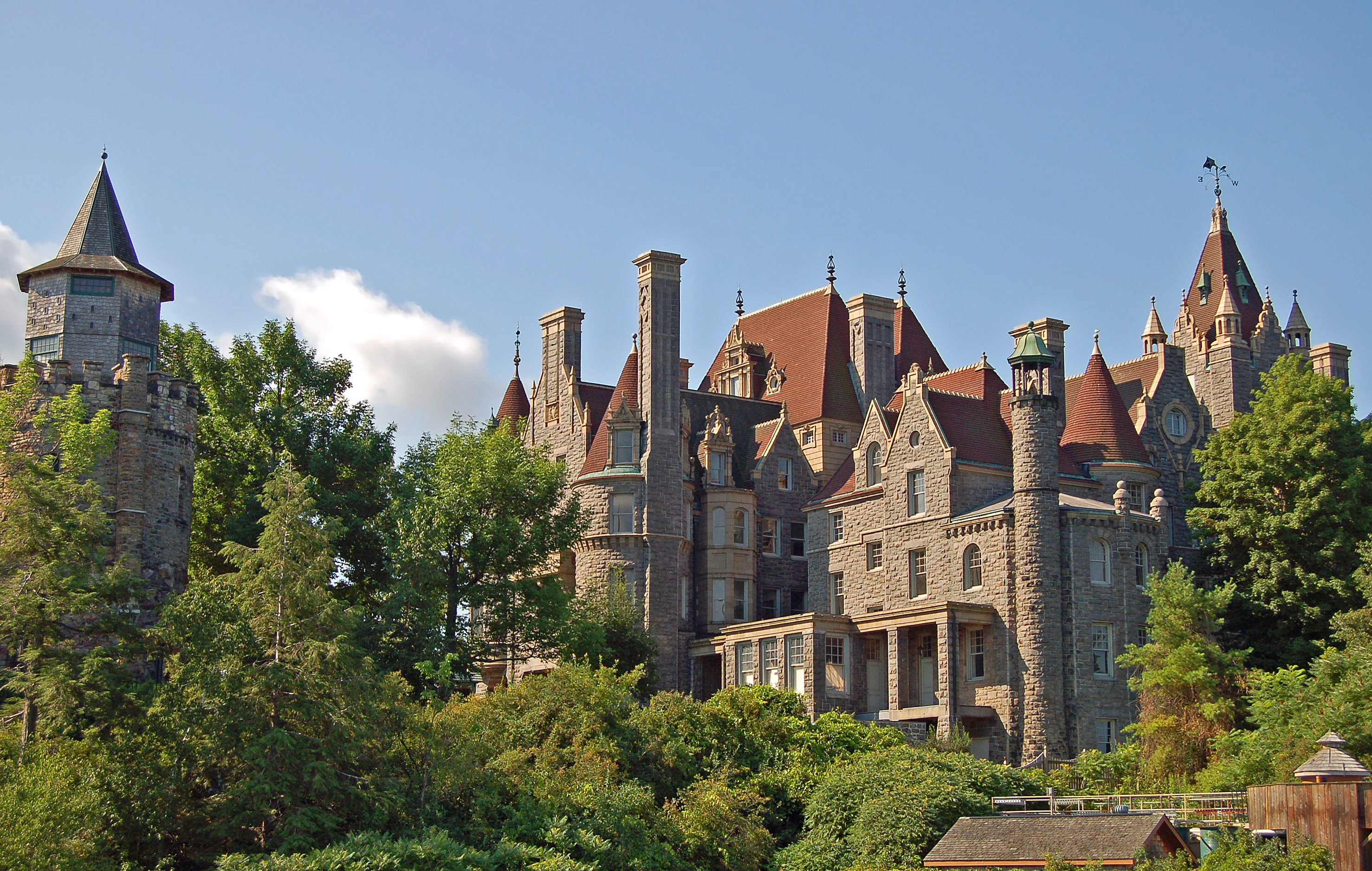
- Interactive map of the Boldt Castle area

General information
- Type: Mansion
- Architectural style: Châteauesque
- Location: Heart Island, Alexandria Bay, New York, United States
- Coordinates: 44°20′40″N 75°55′21″W
- Named for: George Boldt
- Construction started: 1900
- Construction stopped: 1904
- Renovation cost: $15 million (1977)
- Owner: Thousand Islands Bridge Authority

Technical details
- Floor count: 6

Design and construction
- Architecture firm: G. W. & W. D. Hewitt

Website
- www.boldtcastle.com

Boldt Castle is a major landmark and tourist attraction in the Thousand Islands region of the U.S. state of New York. Open to guests seasonally between mid-May and mid-October, it is located on Heart Island in the Saint Lawrence River. Heart Island is part of the Town of Alexandria, in Jefferson County. Originally a private mansion built for German-American millionaire George Boldt, it is now maintained by the Thousand Islands Bridge Authority as a tourist attraction.

== History ==
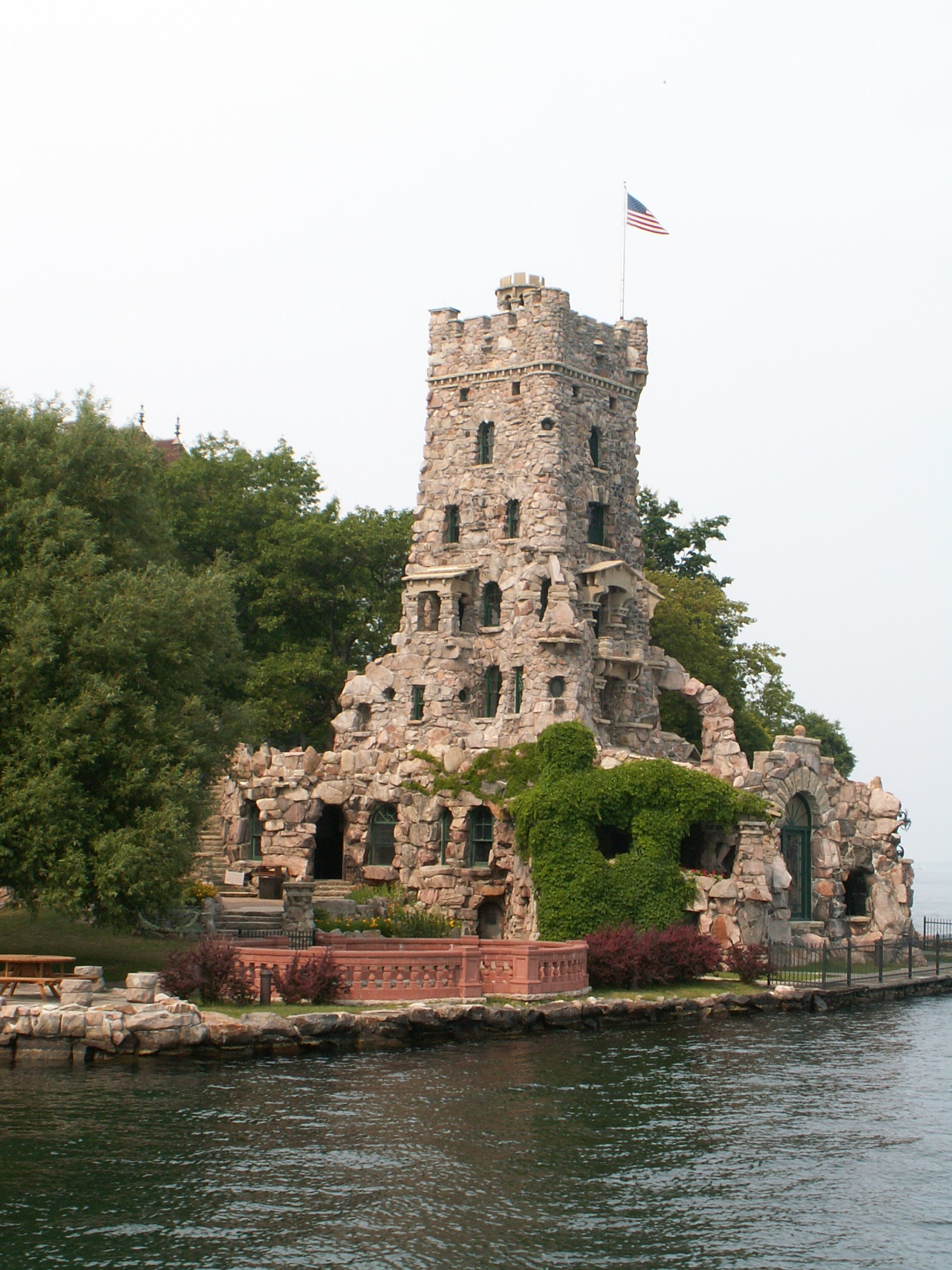
Alster Tower

George Boldt, proprietor of the Waldorf-Astoria Hotel in New York City and manager of The Bellevue-Stratford Hotel in Philadelphia, Pennsylvania, and his family enjoyed an earlier frame cottage on Hart Island (the island's original name) for several summers, which they greatly expanded. In 1900, George Boldt launched an ambitious construction campaign to build a huge masonry structure, one of the largest private homes in the United States. He engaged the architectural firm G. W. & W. D. Hewitt and hundreds of workers to build a six-story castle as a present to his wife. In addition, four other masonry structures on the island are architecturally notable. Equally distinctive is a huge yacht house on neighboring Wellesley Island, where the Boldts had another summer home and a vast estate, incorporating farms, canals, a golf course, tennis courts, stables, and a polo field.

The construction of Boldt Castle ceased abruptly in early 1904 after the death of Boldt's wife, Louise Kehrer Boldt. Boldt never returned to Heart Island, but continued to spend summers in the Thousand Islands until his death in 1916. For 73 years, the castle and other stone structures were left exposed to the harsh winter weather and vandals. The Thousand Islands Bridge Authority acquired Heart Island and the nearby yacht house in 1977, for one dollar, under the agreement that all revenues obtained from the castle operation would be applied towards restoration, so that the island would be preserved for the enjoyment of future generations. In 1981, the movie Fear No Evil was filmed at several sites in and around Boldt Castle, marking the only time the castle has made an appearance in cinema. In the five decades after acquiring the property, the Thousand Islands Bridge Authority spent around $15 million for restoration and improvements with work continuing annually. The initial goal of the restoration of Heart Island was not to finish what had not been completed, but to restore the island to the state it was in when construction was halted. Improvements have surpassed that goal, as a stained glass dome, marble floor, grand staircase woodwork, butler's pantry, servant's dining room and kitchen were restored. As of 2020, over $50 million had been spent on restoration and rehabilitation work on the castle and surrounding structures.

== Current estate ==
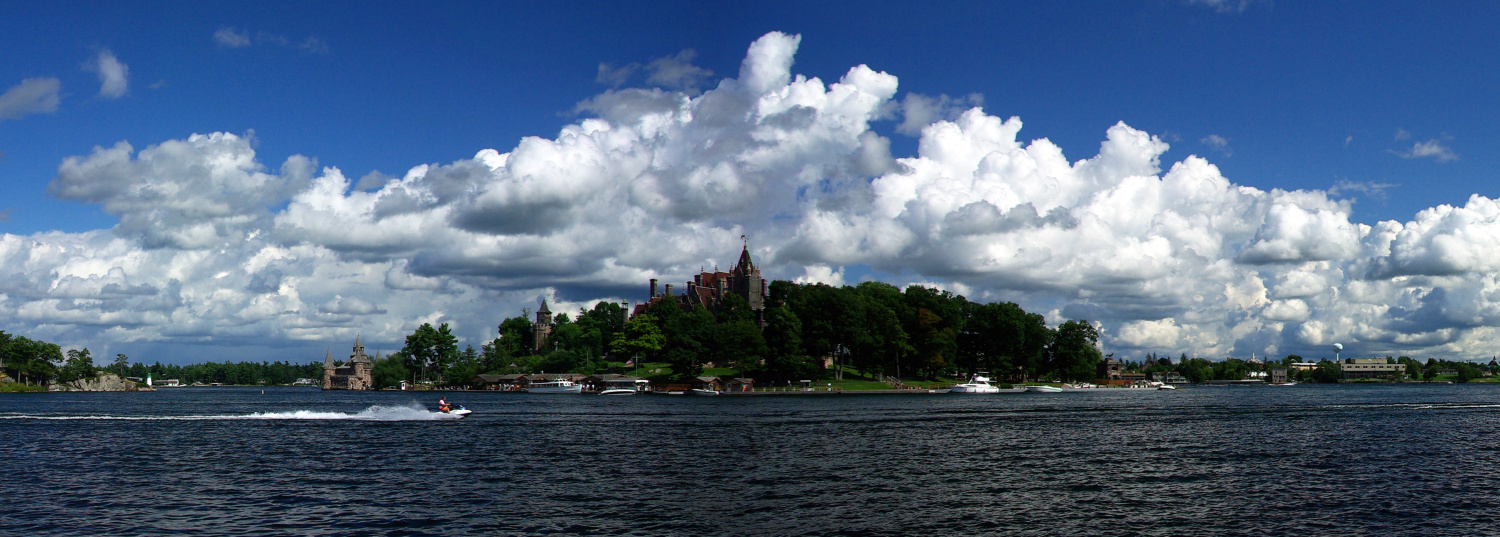
Panoramic view of Heart Island with Boldt Castle

Today, Boldt Castle is accessible by ferry or tour boat from Alexandria Bay, New York, Clayton, New York, Gananoque, Ontario, Rockport, Ontario, and Ivy Lea, Ontario. Most of the grounds and buildings can be explored by the public for a fee. Private boaters may also dock at Heart Island for free. Boldt Castle is a Port of Entry and has a U.S. Customs and Border Protection office on Heart Island. Visitors coming from Canada require appropriate identification to check in to the country, as visiting the island is considered entering the United States.

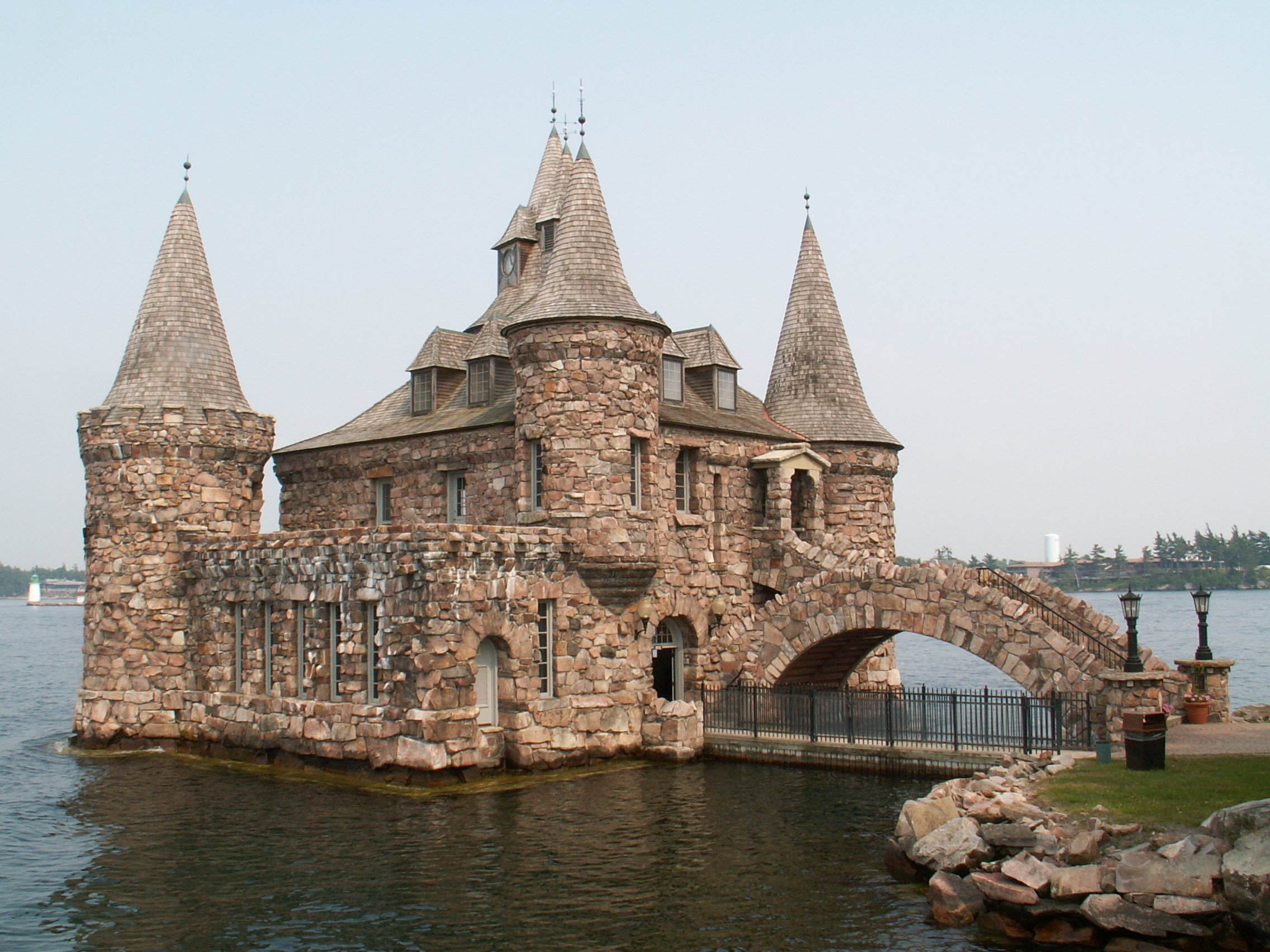
Power house

All of the rooms on the first floor and second floors of Boldt Castle are restored and furnished. The second floor houses the Gift Shop and Theatre, where visitors can view a 16-minute documentary about George Boldt and Boldt Castle. Most of the rooms on the third and fourth floors are unfurnished, but there are exhibits of pictures and original artifacts of the Thousand Islands region during the Gilded Age in which the Boldts lived. Rooms are also left unfurnished to give the visitor an opportunity to imagine what the castle looked like before the Thousand Island Bridge Authority's restoration efforts. The basement is mostly unfinished, with a swimming pool, many compartments, and a long tunnel passage to the Power House. At the edge of the island, a large peristyle archway stands as the intended original entrance way for boats to Heart island. The bridge connecting the two sides would have been raised and lowered as required.

The Power House is located on the eastern edge of the island, and was built to hold a generator to supply the island with power via steam generator. Exhibits inside describe how power was obtained in the early 1900s, and hosts a small display of historic photographs of Boldt Castle construction and the Thousand Islands region Nearly destroyed by a fire in the 1930s, the Power House was one of the first restoration projects completed after the Thousand Island Bridge Authority acquired it in 1977.

Alster Tower was modeled after a Rhineland defense tower in Germany and purposely constructed with slanting and uneven walls, ceilings, and roofs. This unique structure sits on the south side of the island facing Alexandria Bay, and boasts a two-lane bowling alley and stage for performances. The Alster Tower cafe is one of the restoration projects currently taking place on the island.

The George C. Boldt Yacht House on nearby Wellesley Island represents the only remaining wooden yacht house structure of this kind. The interior features extensive living quarters and a number of antique and wooden boats. For an additional admission fee, visitors can take a shuttle from Heart Island to the Yacht House on Wellesley Island to tour these exhibits. It was listed on the National Register of Historic Places in 1978.

The 1969 children's novel Secret Castle by Anne Colver is about the castle and Alexandria Bay.

== Gallery ==
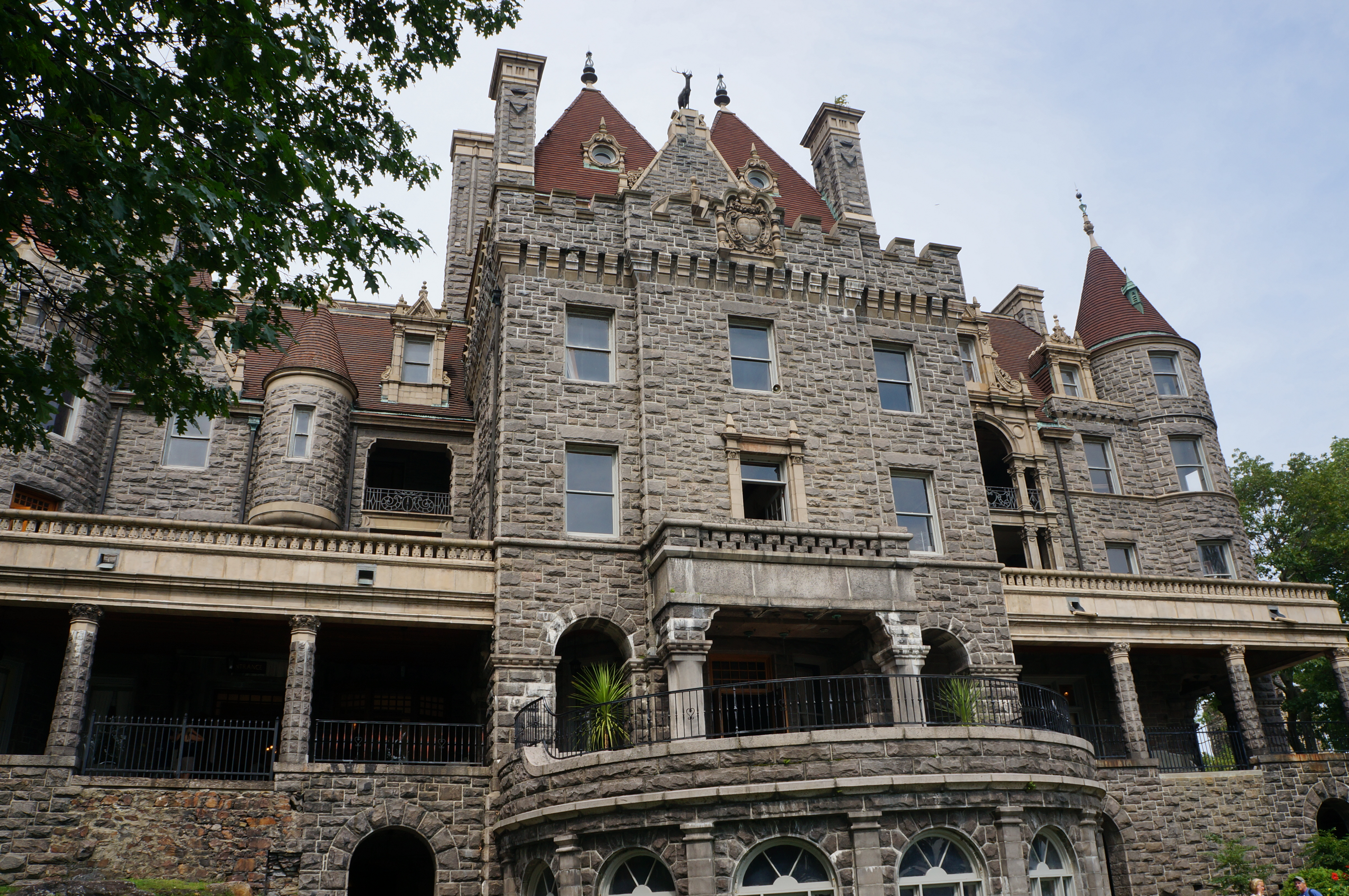
Boldt Castle on Heart Island

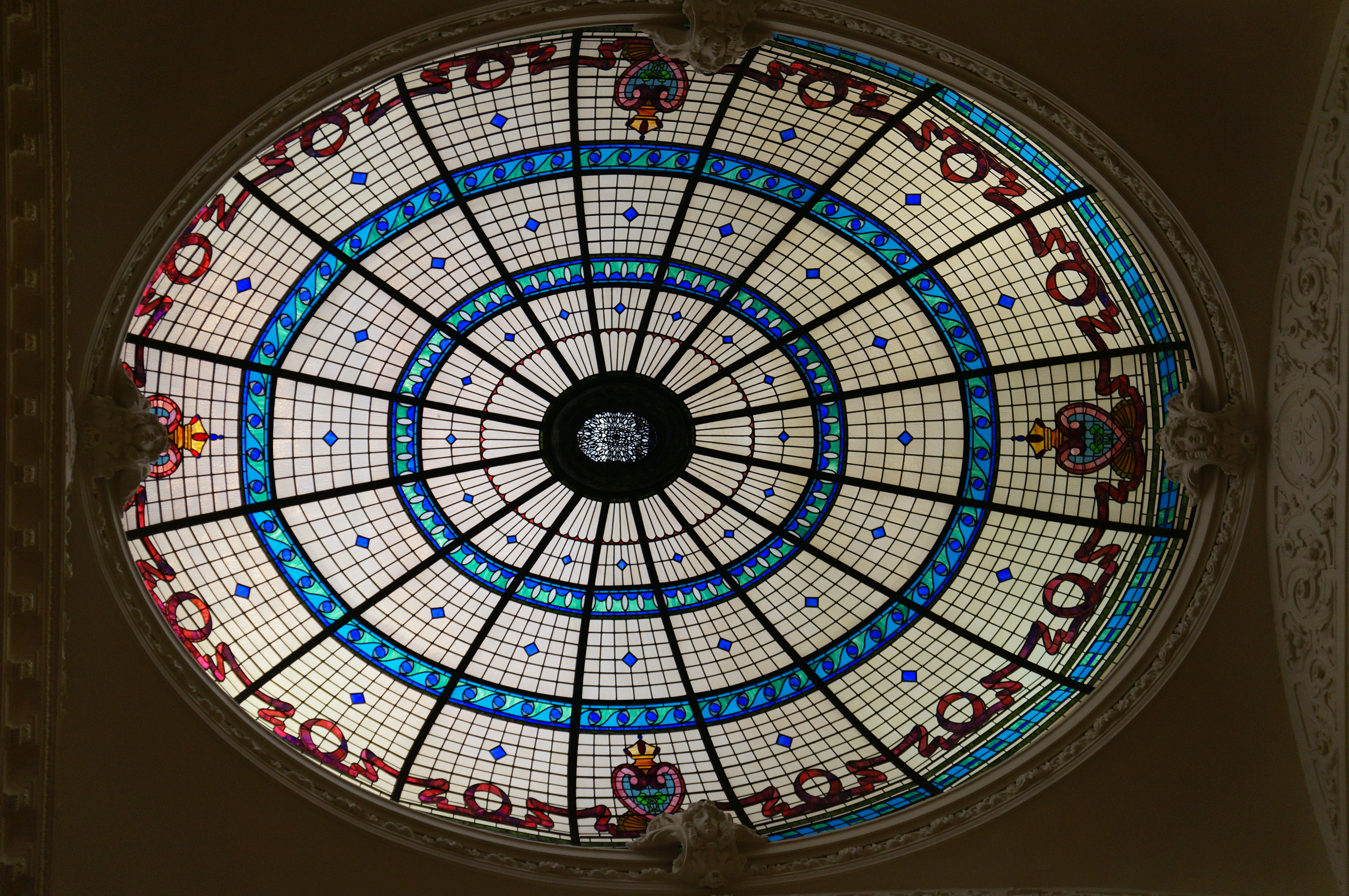
Stained glass ceiling of Boldt Castle on Heart Island

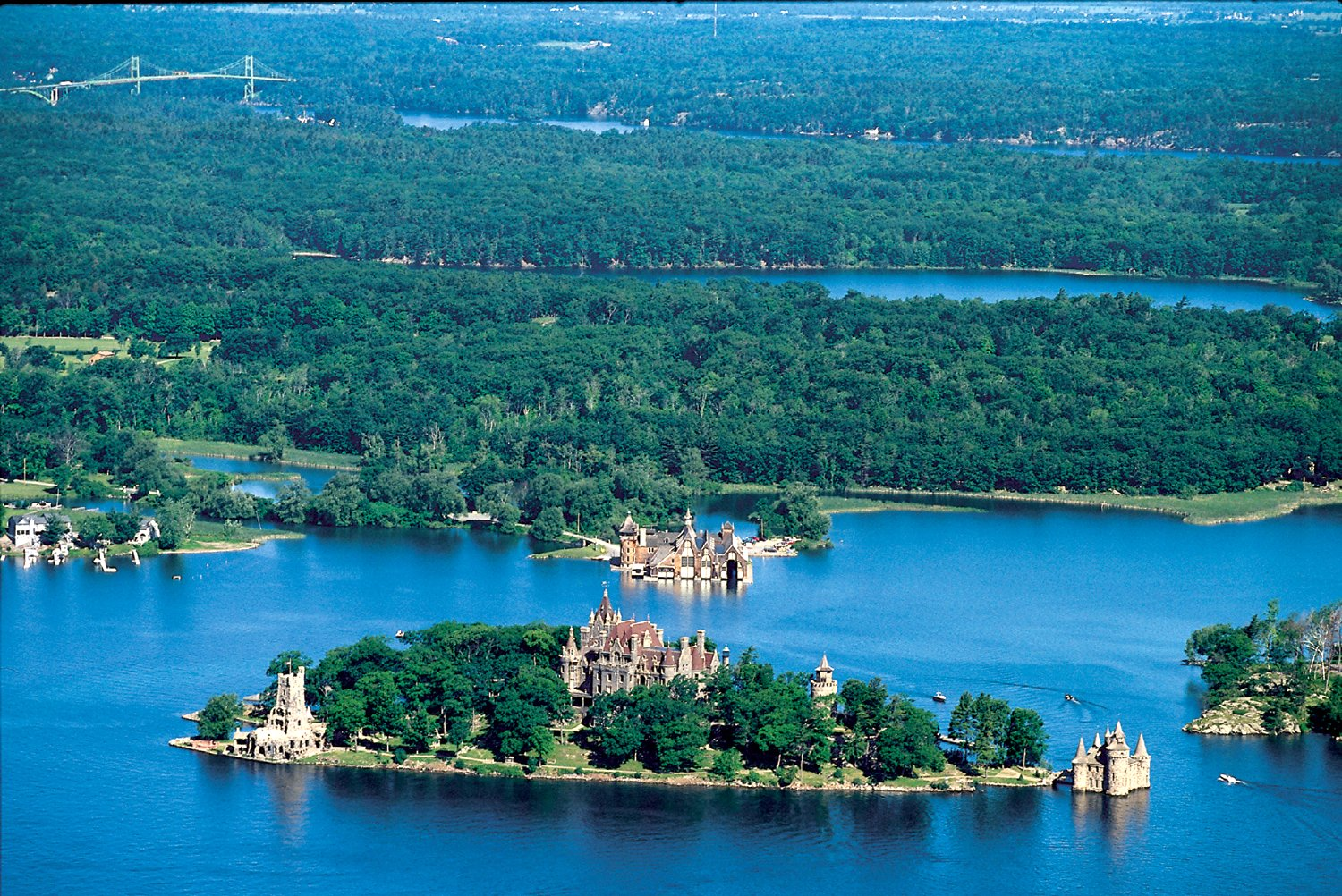
Aerial view of Boldt Castle and some of the Thousand Islands

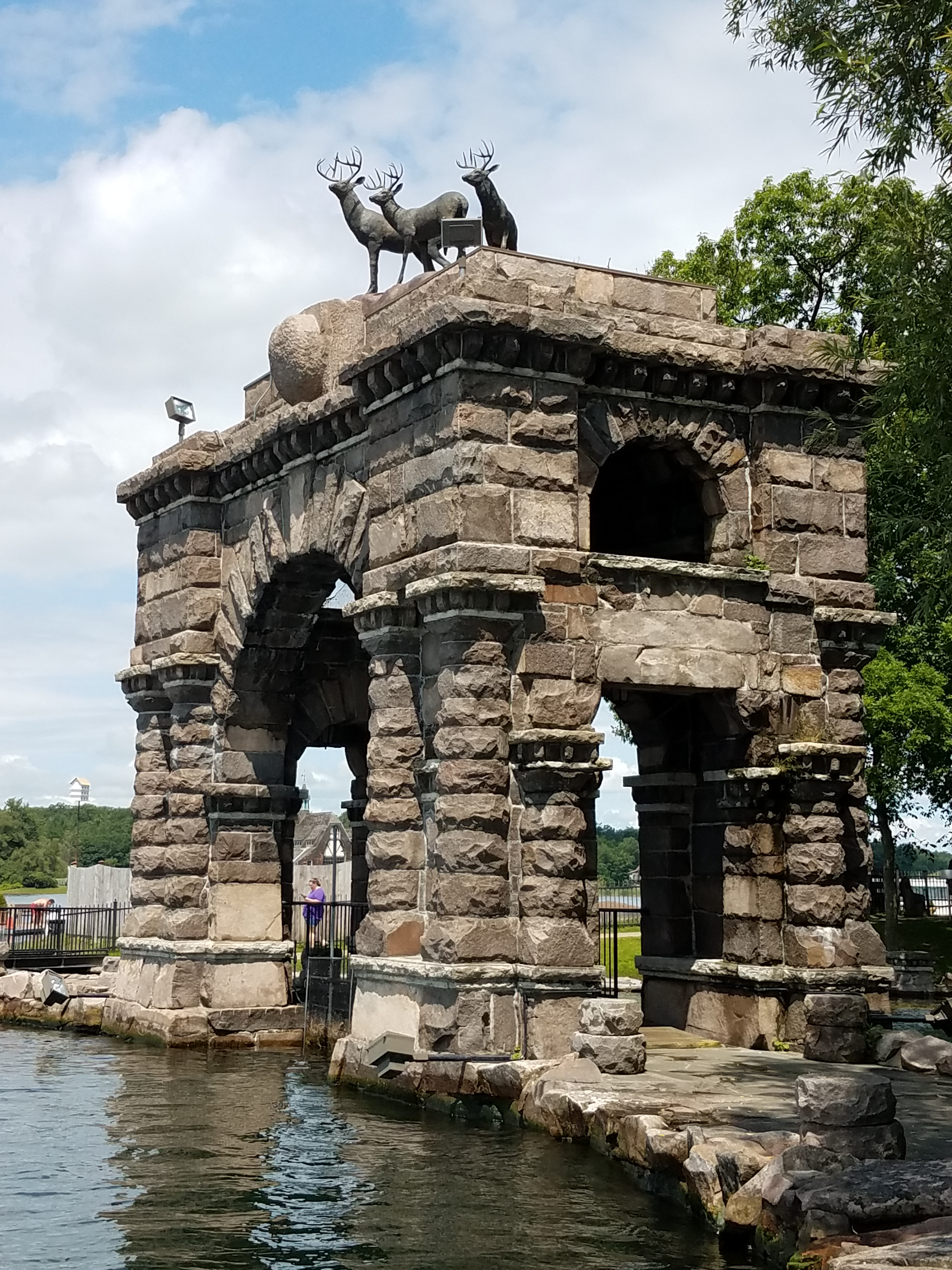
Entry Arch of Boldt Castle.

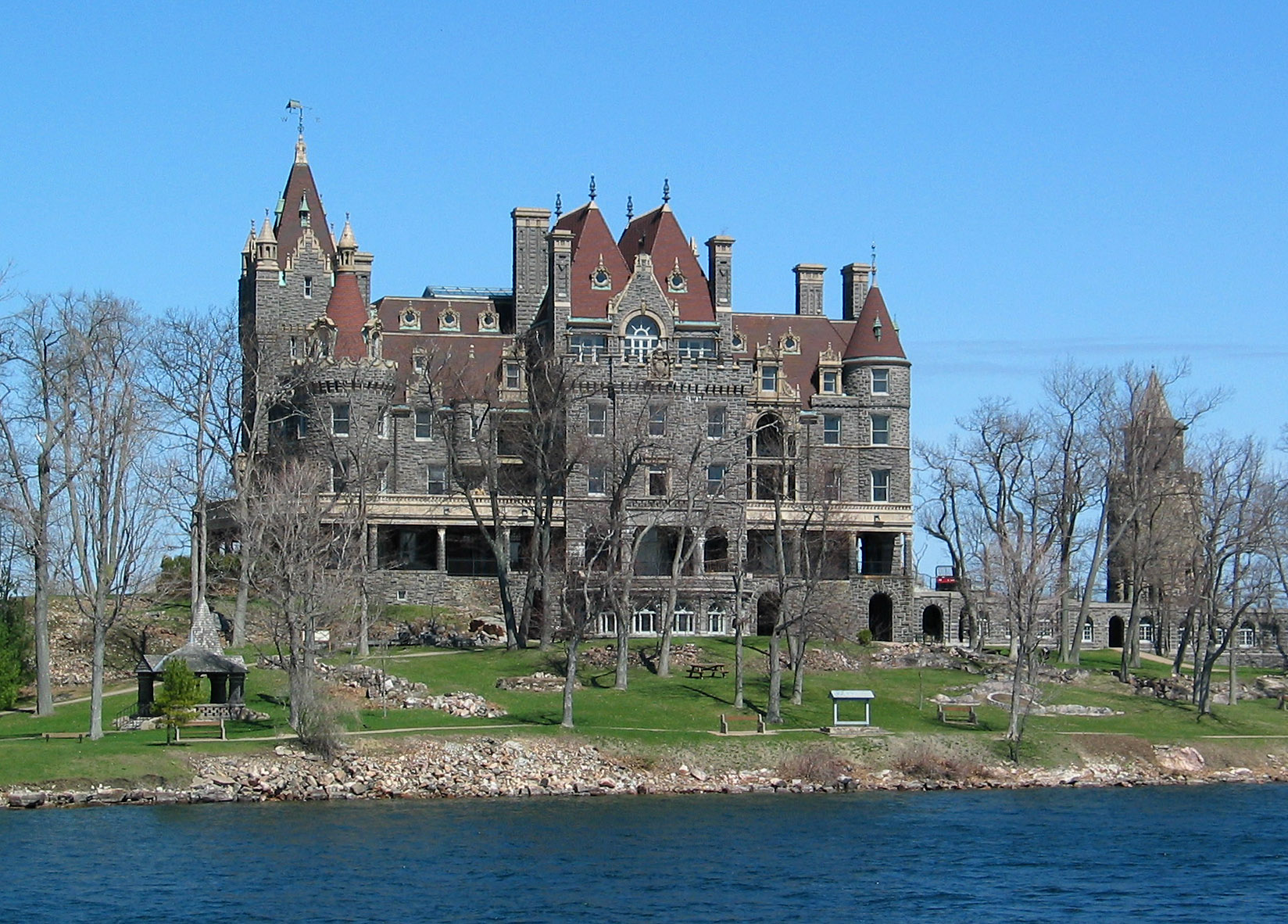
1000 Islands, Boldt Castle, St Lawrence River.

== See also ==
- Calumet Island
- Castle Rest
- Dark Island
- Just Room Enough Island
