= Thousand Islands Border Crossing =

Canada–United States border crossing

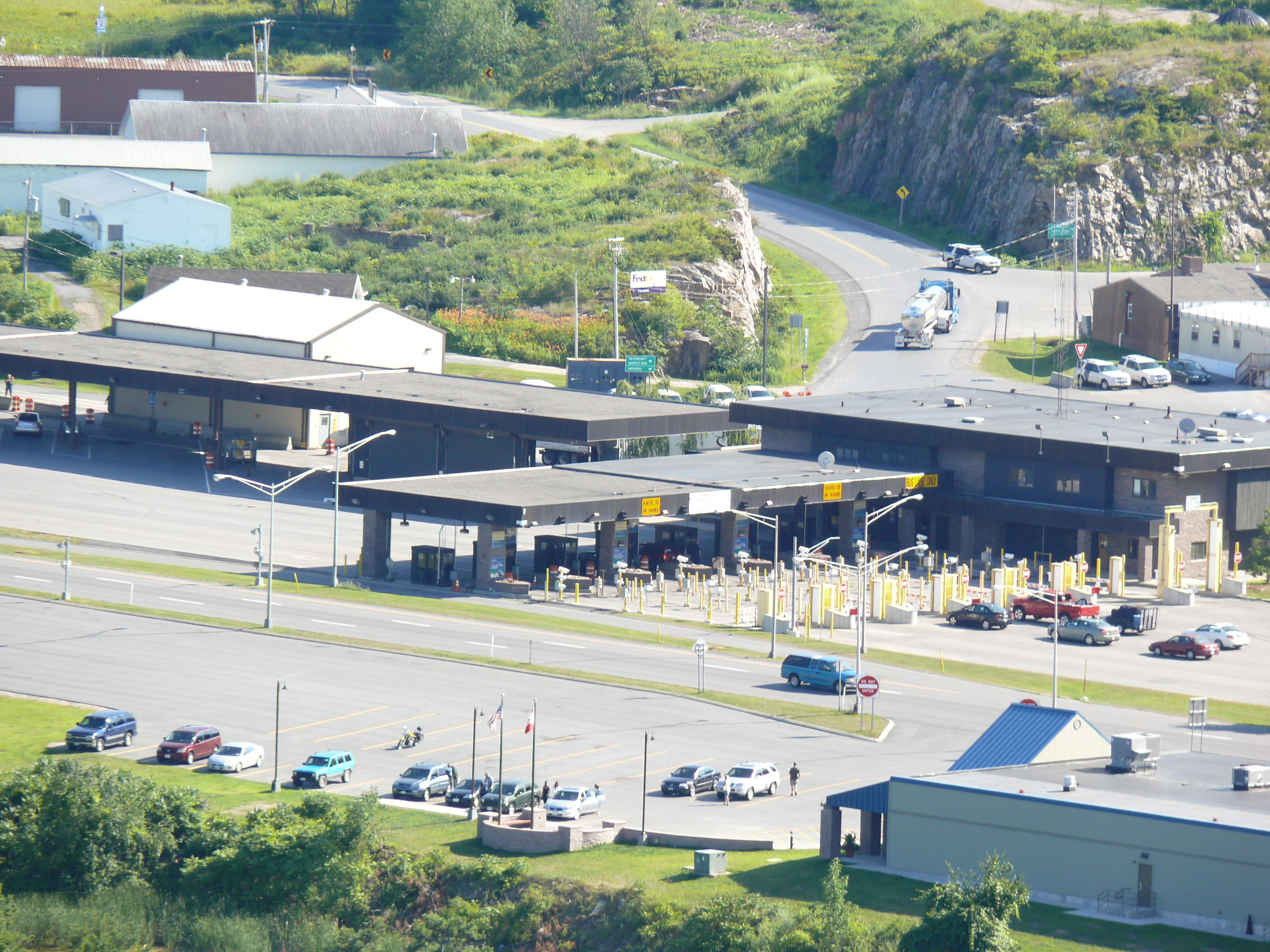
- US Border Inspection Station at the Thousand Islands Border Crossing as seen in 2009

Locaiton
- Country: United States; Canada
- Location: I-81 / Highway 137 / Thousand Islands Bridge; US Port: 46735 Interstate Route 81, Alexandria Bay, New York 13607; Canadian Port: 860 Highway 137, Lansdowne, Ontario K0E 1L0
- Coordinates: 44.347318°N 75.983396°W

Details
- Opened: 1938

Website
- www.cbp.gov/contact/ports/alexandria-bay www.cbsa-asfc.gc.ca/do-rb/offices-bureaux/223-eng.html

The Thousand Islands Border Crossing connects the towns of Alexandria Bay, New York, and Ivy Lea, Ontario, on the Canada–US border. The crossing is via the international span of the Thousand Islands Bridge. The Thousand Islands bridge, which was completed in 1938, is actually a system of five bridges and the island roadways connecting them. The international span, which crosses a small rift between Wellesley Island in the US and Hill Island in Canada, is only 90 feet (27 m) in length. A second, parallel span was built in 1959 to accommodate congestion at the ports of entry. The US and Canada border stations are located at the opposite ends of this span.

The crossing is the westernmost of the three on the St. Lawrence River and is very busy, with up to two hours of waits during the summer. The US border station of Alexandria Bay has sometimes been called "Thousand Islands", and the Canada border station of Lansdowne has sometimes been called "Gananoque", named for the nearby town where international ferry service has historically been (and continues to be) provided. These border stations are also responsible for inspecting vessel traffic between the two countries. The US has seasonal vessel inspection stations on Heart Island and at Cape Vincent, New York, and Canada has seasonal vessel inspection stations at Rockport, Ontario, and Gananoque, Ontario, and both Canada Border Services Agency (CBSA) and the U.S. Customs and Border Protection (CBP) will travel to selected ports and marinas to conduct inspections upon request.

== Future ==
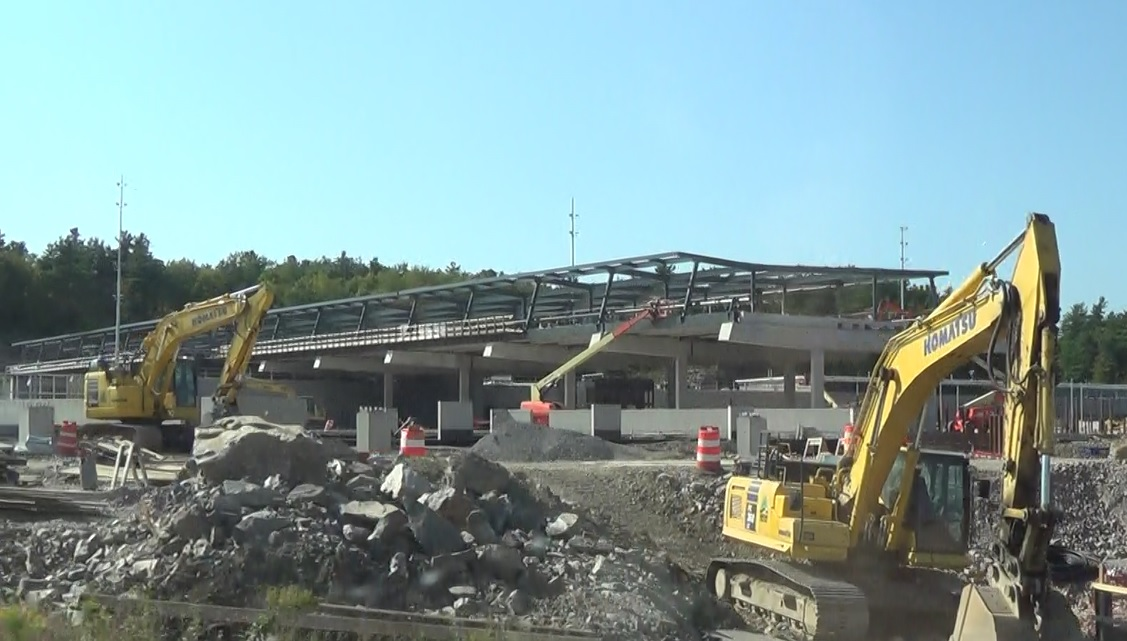
New US border station under construction in 2019

In 2019, a new border station with five inspection booths, was under construction on the US side, to replace the former border facility. As of 2022 the new facility has been opened and is currently in service, although certain parts of the facility remain under construction.

== See also ==
- List of Canada–United States border crossings
