= Ontario Highway 137 =

Ontario provincial highway

Highway 137

Route information
- Maintained by the Ministry of Transportation of Ontario
- Length: 4.3 km (2.7 mi)
- Existed: 1965–present

Major junctions
- South end: I-81 at the U.S. border on Hill Island
- North end: Highway 401 near Ivy Lea

Location
- Country: Canada
- Province: Ontario

Highway system
- Ontario provincial highways; Current; Former; 400-series
← Highway 132	→ Highway 138
Former provincial highways
← Highway 136

King's Highway 137, commonly referred to as Highway 137, is a provincially maintained highway in the Canadian province of Ontario that connects the northern end of Interstate 81 in the U.S. state of New York with Highway 401 via the Canadian span of the Thousand Islands Bridge. While this road connected to the international bridge when it opened in August 1938, it was not designated as a King's Highway until 1965. Highway 137 passes through a portion of the Canadian Shield, a geographic feature which aided construction of the three Canadian spans of the Thousand Islands Bridge. These bridges, all of different designs, travel 538 m (1,765 ft) across the Saint Lawrence River. Highway 137 is 4.3 km (2.7 mi) in length and is located entirely within the United Counties of Leeds and Grenville.

== Route description ==
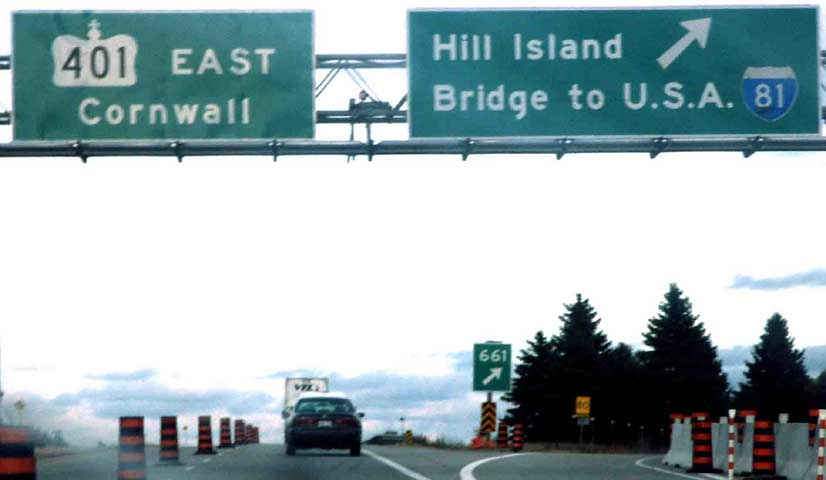
Highway 401 eastbound at Highway 137 in 2004

The short 4.3-kilometre (2.7 mi) route connects the U.S. border with Highway 401 via the Thousand Islands Bridge. The section on Hill Island is a two-lane highway with limited development and two at-grade intersections, while the mainland section is a four-lane freeway with an interchange at the Thousand Islands Parkway in addition to its northern terminus at Highway 401. Connecting the two segments is a series of bridges between the Ontario mainland and Hill Island, which is a tolled in the southbound direction (northbound tolls are paid on the New York mainland). The entire route is located within Leeds and Grenville United Counties.

Highway 137 begins at the U.S. border crossing between Wellesley and Hill Islands, where it continues as south as I-81 towards Syracuse, New York. After leaving the toll plaza and passing the duty free stores, the route curves northeast where it travels past the Thousand Islands Tower observation deck before turning north. The highway crosses three spans of the Thousand Islands Bridge over the Saint Lawrence River, including a 183 m (600 ft) Warren truss bridge between Hill Island and Constance Island, a 106 m (348 ft) arch bridge between Constance and Georgina Islands, and a 230 m (750 ft) suspension bridge between Georgina Island and the Ontario mainland.

On the northern shore of the St. Lawrence, Highway 137 abruptly turns eastward, passing a road maintenance facility and the southbound toll booths before curving back northward as it widens into a divided highway at an interchange with the Thousand Islands Parkway. The final segment of the highway travels through forest before ending at a trumpet interchange with Highway 401 midway between Gananoque and Brockville. The geography surrounding the entire route features large rock outcroppings of the Frontenac Arch in the Canadian Shield through which the highway passes. The close proximity of bedrock to the surface resulted in substantial savings during the construction of the bridges along the route.

== History ==
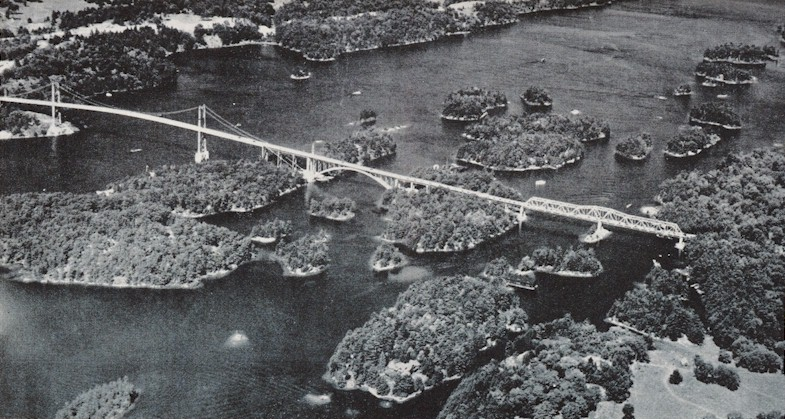
The Thousand Islands Bridge opened August 18, 1938; Highway 137 was designated 27 years later

The Thousand Islands Bridge system was opened in a ceremony on August 18, 1938 by Canadian prime minister William Lyon Mackenzie King and American president Franklin D. Roosevelt. Also in attendance was Albert Matthews, lieutenant governor of Ontario, representing the King in Right of Ontario. The new bridge approach included an interchange with the St. Lawrence River Road, known today as the Thousand Islands Parkway, but it was not numbered. Until 1965, the route was known as the Ivy Lea Bridge Approach. Highway 137 was first designated in 1965 as far as the Thousand Islands Parkway. It was extended to the newly opened Highway 401 in 1968. The route has remained unchanged in the years since then.

== Major intersections ==
The following table lists the major junctions along Highway 137, as noted by the Ministry of Transportation of Ontario. The entire route is located in Leeds and the Thousand Islands, the United Counties of Leeds and Grenville.

km	mi	Destinations	Notes
0.0	0.0	I-81 south – Syracuse	Hill Island; continuation into New York
0.0	0.0	Canada–United States border at Thousand Islands Border Crossing	
1.3– 2.3	0.81– 1.4	Thousand Islands Bridge crosses St. Lawrence River	
2.7	1.7	Thousand Islands Parkway	Beginning of divided freeway
4.3	2.7	Highway 401 – Toronto, Kingston, Ottawa, Montreal	Highway 401 exit 661
1.000 mi = 1.609 km; 1.000 km = 0.621 mi: Tolled; Route transition
