= Thousand Islands Parkway =

Scenic parkway in Ontario

- St. Lawrence River Road
- Thousand Islands Parkway highlighted in red

Route information
- Maintained by the St. Lawrence Parks Commission
- Length: 39.1 km (24.3 mi)
- History: Opened in 1938; Numbered Highway 2S in 1948; Renumbered Highway 401 in 1952; Renumbered Highway 2S in 1967; Decommissioned September 8, 1970

Major junctions
- From: Highway 401 west in Gananoque
- Highway 137 to Thousand Islands Bridge to the United States
- To: Highway 401 east near Butternut Bay

Location
- Country: Canada
- Province: Ontario

Highway system
- Parkways of the Great Lakes; Long Sault; Niagara; St. Clair; 1000 Islands; Roads in Ontario
← Highway 2	→ Highway 3
Former provincial highways
← Highway 2A

The Thousand Islands Parkway (often written as 1000 Islands Parkway) is a scenic parkway in the Canadian province of Ontario. It extends easterly from an interchange with Highway 401 in Gananoque for approximately 40 kilometres (25 mi) to rejoin Highway 401 near the community of Butternut Bay, west of Brockville. The parkway follows the north shore of the St. Lawrence River, and was formerly designated Highway 2S (S for Scenic) until 1970. It passes through the communities of Gray's Beach, Halsteads Bay, Ivy Lea, Darlingside, Rockport, Narrows, La Rue Mills and Mallorytown Landing, as well as providing access to the three inland properties of the Thousand Islands National Park. Highway 137, which meets the parkway near its midpoint, provides access to the Interstate 81 in New York via the Thousand Islands Bridge.

The Thousand Islands Parkway was constructed as a divided highway during the late 1930s, alongside the Thousand Islands Bridge, which opened in 1938. Originally known as the St. Lawrence River Road, the parkway became part of Highway 401 when the 400-series highway system was established in 1952. However by that time numerous properties and tourism had been established which made the parkway difficult to upgrade to a full freeway, so in 1968 Highway 401 was rerouted along a new alignment (the Thousand Islands Bypass) north of the existing parkway. The Highway 2S designation returned between 1967 and 1970, after which jurisdiction over the parkway was transferred to the St. Lawrence Parks Commission. The northern carriageway of the parkway was never paved, and was only in use by vehicles between 1938 and 1951. Evidence of its former use can be seen today in the wide right-of-way; the unused westbound lanes now serve as a recreational trail and twin bridges span two locations along the parkway.

== Route description ==
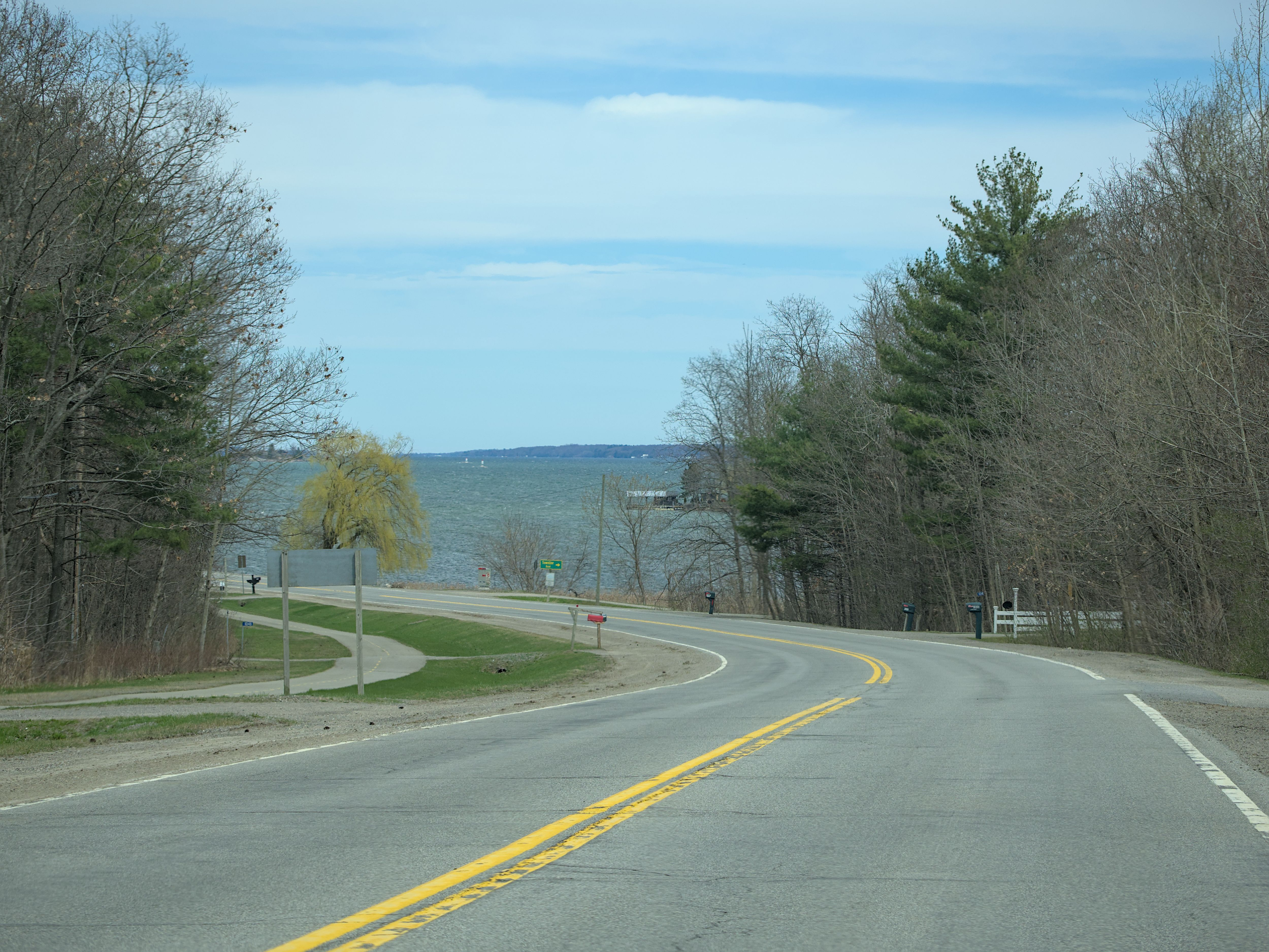
The Thousand Islands Parkway eastbound at the Escott-Yonge townline

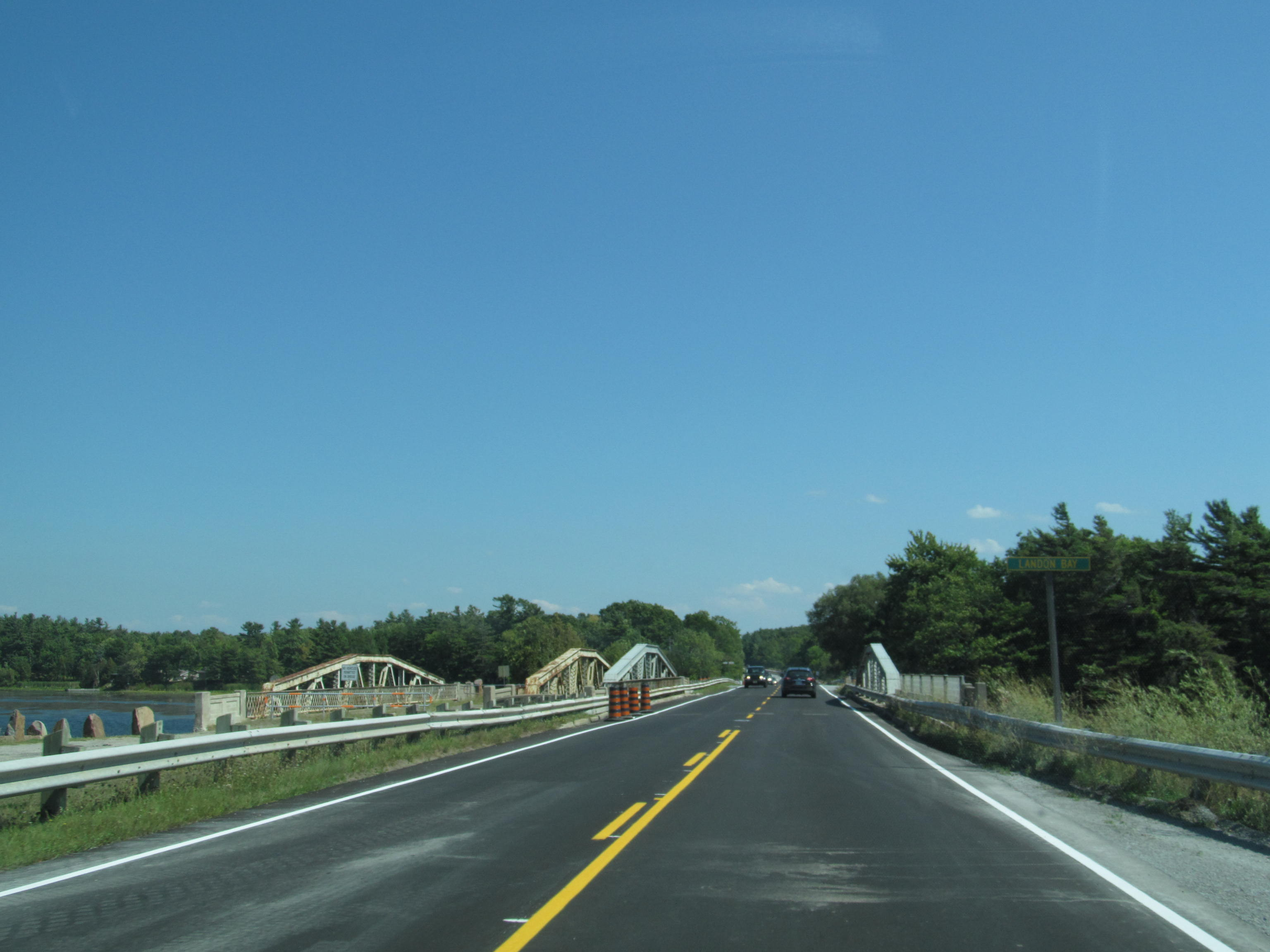
The Thousand Islands Parkway eastbound at Landon Bay

The Thousand Islands Parkway is a scenic route along the St. Lawrence River between Gananoque and Brockville through the rugged terrain of the Frontenac Arch, a protrusion of the Canadian Shield southward into New York state. In this area, the soil is underlain by layers of Paleozoic limestone and a granite bedrock. The granite often extends above the ground surface as large rock outcroppings. The Thousand Islands Parkway was part of the original alignment of Highway 401. However, because of the residential properties and the scenic nature of the parkway, a new inland route known as the Thousand Islands Bypass was constructed for Highway 401 through the mid-1960s. A recreational trail follows the right-of-way of the westbound carriageway, which was never completed.

The Thousand Islands Parkway begins at a split with Highway 401 on the outskirts of Gananoque. There is no access from westbound Highway 401 to the parkway nor from westbound on the parkway to eastbound Highway 401. However, immediately east of the split, both highways interchange with the sole remaining portion of Highway 2 under provincial jurisdiction. East of this point the three diverge into the Frontenac Arch. It meets Highway 137 at an interchange at the parkways midpoint; the Ontario approach to the Thousand Islands Bridge which continues as Interstate 81 south of the Canada–United States border. The parkway continues northeast, serving the riverside communities of Darlingside, Rockport, Narrows, La Rue Mills and Mallorytown Landing. At Butternut Bay, the Thousand Islands Parkway merges into the eastbound lanes of Highway 401 and a left-hand exit provides access to the parkway from westbound Highway 401. The three inland properties of Thousand Islands National Park are located on the Thousand Islands Parkway: Landon Bay, Mallorytown Landing and Jones Creek.

== History ==
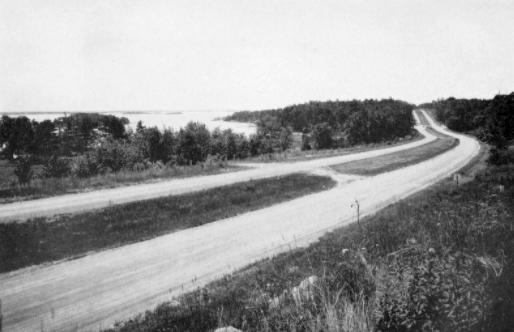
Newly-graded St. Lawrence River Road circa 1944

The idea for a scenic parkway along the shoreline of the St. Lawrence between Gananoque and Brockville was first proposed by George Fulford, a local Member of Provincial Parliament (MPP) elected in the 1934 Ontario general election to represent Leeds. By 1935, with early construction underway on the Thousand Islands Bridge, Fulford had convinced the incoming Minister of Public Works and Highways, Thomas McQuesten, of the merits of a scenic route for tourism and as a depression relief project. McQuesten, who was seeking to build a trans-provincial divided highway, decided the river road would be the ideal route through the rough terrain between Gananoque and Brockville. On April 29, 1937, The Ontario Department of Highways (DHO), predecessor to the modern Ministry of Transportation, formally announced the building of the St. Lawrence River Road. It was built under two separate contracts. Work on the first, awarded to Campbell Construction to build the section between Gananoque and Ivy Lea, began the week of June 7, 1937, while work on the second, awarded to Standard Paving Company to build the section between Ivy Lea and Butternut Bay, began the week of September 12. Standard Paving was already widening 6 km (3.7 mi) of Highway 2 between Butternut Bay and Brockville at the time.

On August 18, 1938, the Thousand Islands Bridge was opened, with an attendance of over 50,000 people. Prime Minister Mackenzie King and President Franklin D. Roosevelt both presided over the ceremonies. In preparation, the 13.8-kilometre (8.6 mi) portion of the parkway west of Ivy Lea was quickly gravelled to provide access to the new bridge. Only the 2.7-kilometre (1.7 mi) section between the Ivy Lea and the bridge approach remained open following the ceremonies, however; traffic to and from the bridge accessed Highway 2 via what is now Fitzsimmons Road. A section between Mallorytown Landing and Butternut Bay was opened in October 1938 as a two-lane gravel road with a temporary bridge crossing Jones Creek. Elsewhere, construction resumed on blasting rock and grading the route for several more years. A contract to build the bridges at Jones Creek was awarded on May 25, 1940, and completed by the end of the year. The bridges at Landon Bay meanwhile, were completed in late October 1940. In 1941, the St. Lawrence River Road was completed and opened to traffic from Gananoque to Brockville, though it remained unpaved. Labour and material shortages during World War II resulted in road construction being deferred for several years. Following the war, the south lanes of the road were paved between Gananoque and Rockport in 1946. The unpaved north lanes were opened to travel beginning in 1946. They remained in service until 1951, when they were closed to traffic; they would not reopen.

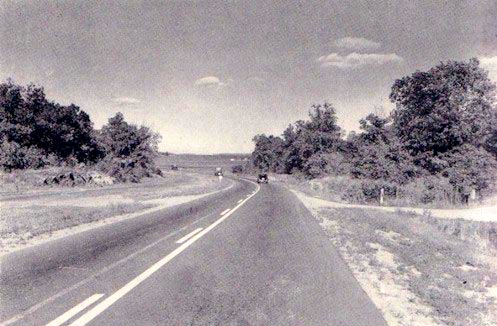
Highway 2S at La Rue Mills in 1949

By 1948, the St. Lawrence River Road, or "Scenic Highway", had been assigned the route number 2S, with the "S" for "scenic", and the remainder of the south lanes between Rockport and Butternut Bay had been paved. In July 1952 (possibly July 1, the same day Highway 400 was numbered), (Note: The Department of Highways Fiscal Report for the year ending March 31, 1952, claims "Controlled Access Highways nos. 400 and 401 were signed". However, all other sources claim July.) Highway 2S was designated as part of the new Highway 401. For the next 18 years, Highway 401 travelled along the scenic river road. Initially it merely bypassed Highway 2; it would not see extensions west of Gananoque and east of Butternut Bay until 1959. That year saw the south lanes of the parkway rebuilt and marked as a proper two-lane undivided highway. As originally envisioned by McQuesten, the trans-provincial freeway would follow the scenic highway. However, in the decades since, numerous properties and a tourist industry were established. James Auld, MPP for Leeds and the Minister of Tourism and Information, joined local residents to persuade the DHO to construct an inland bypass. The DHO agreed, stating that it would cost less to build a new freeway than to upgrade the parkway.

Construction of the Thousand Islands Bypass began in 1965, with work proceeding east from Gananoque. The Thousand Islands Parkway was the final two-lane segment of Highway 401. A portion was opened on September 1, 1967, from Gananoque to Highway 137, which was itself built south to the parkway at the same time. The Highway 401 designation was applied along this new route, while the bypassed portion of the parkway was redesignated as Highway 2S. Despite the expected influx of traffic from the United States for Expo 67 in Montreal, the DHO opted to build the portion east of Ivy Lea after the centennial celebrations. The remainder of the bypass was opened to traffic on October 11, 1968, at which point the entire parkway once again became Highway 2S. This designation would also only last for just under two years. On September 8, 1970, the DHO transferred jurisdiction over the parkway to the St. Lawrence Parks Commission; it has since been known only as the Thousand Islands Parkway. This name was first brought forward to the DHO in 1954 by the Thousand Island–Rideau Lakes Association.

== Major intersections ==
The following table lists the major junctions along Thousand Islands Parkway, as noted by the St. Lawrence Parks Commission. The entire route is located in the United Counties of Leeds and Grenville.

Location	km	mi	Destinations	Notes
Gananoque	0.0	0.0	Highway 401 west – Kingston	Westbound entrance and eastbound exit; Highway 401 exit 647
Gananoque	1.0	0.6	Highway 2 to Highway 401 east – Gananoque	Provides access to eastbound and from westbound Highway 401
Ivy Lea	15.2	9.4	Highway 137 to I-81 – Hill Island, Thousand Islands Bridge to U.S.	
Mallorytown Landing	29.4	18.3	County Road 5 north (Mallorytown Road) – Mallorytown	
Butternut Bay	39.1	24.3	Highway 401 east – Brockville, Cornwall	Eastbound entrance and westbound exit; Highway 401 exit 685
1.000 mi = 1.609 km; 1.000 km = 0.621 mi

== Bibliography ==
- Shragge, John; Bagnato, Sharon (1984). From Footpaths to Freeways. Toronto: Ontario Ministry of Transportation and Communications, Historical Committee. ISBN 978-0-7743-9388-1.
