= Wellesley Island State Park =

State park in New York, United States

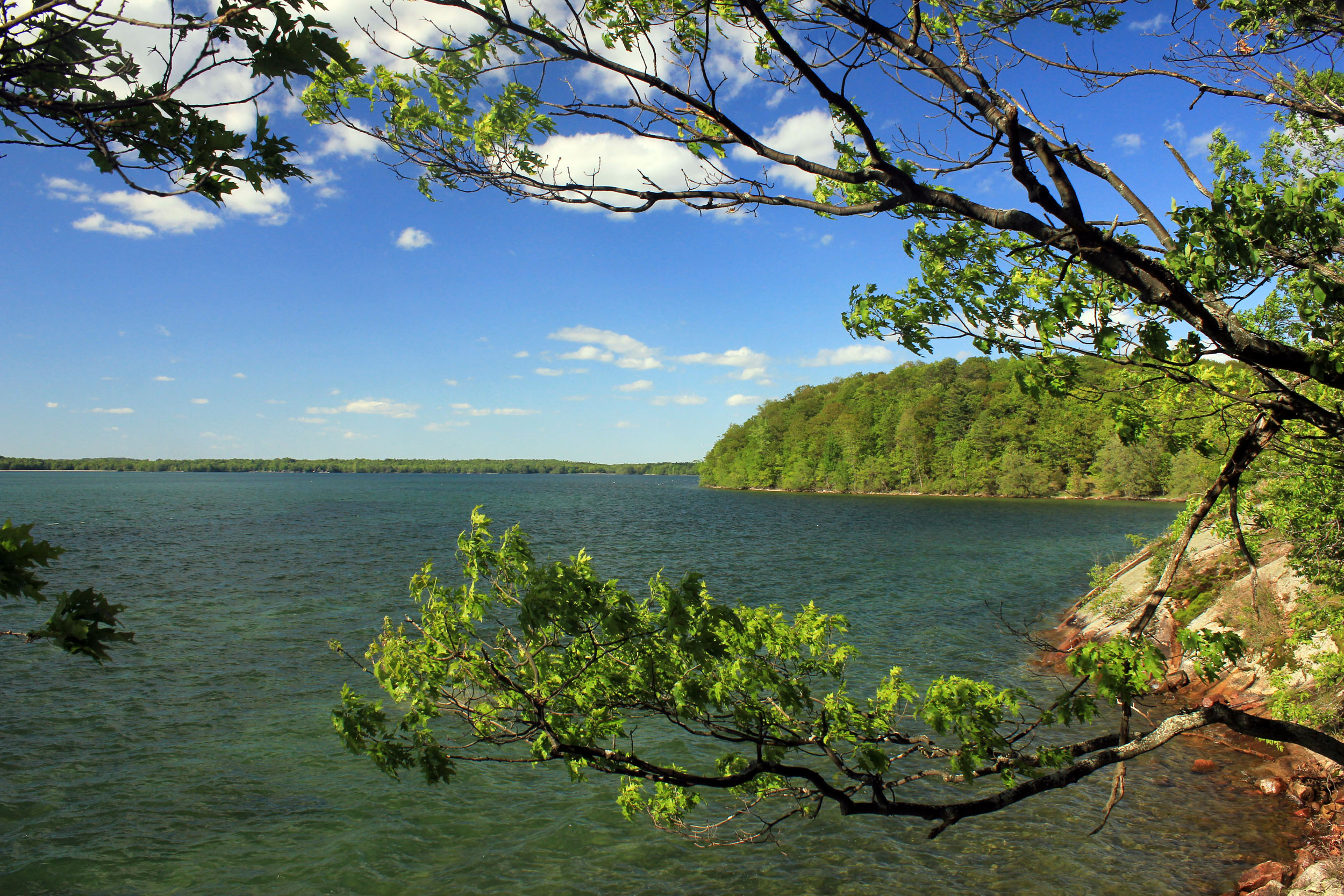
- View from the shore of Wellesley Island in Wellesley Island State Park.

- Location within New York
- Type: State park
- Location: 44927 Cross Island Road; Fineview, New York
- Nearest city: Alexandria Bay, New York
- Coordinates: 44°19′00″N 76°01′14″W
- Area: 2,636 acres (10.67 km^{2})
- Created: 1951
- Operator: New York State Office of Parks, Recreation and Historic Preservation
- Visitors: 184,010 (in 2025)
- Open: All year
- Website: Wellesley Island State Park

Wellesley Island State Park is a 2,636-acre (10.67 km^{2}) state park located on Wellesley Island in the St. Lawrence River in the Town of Orleans in Jefferson County, New York. The park is divided into sections that are on different parts of the island. It has the largest camping complex in the Thousand Islands region, including wilderness campsites on the banks of the St. Lawrence accessible only by foot or boat. The park is open year-round.

== History ==
The Thousand Island State Park Commission began purchasing farmland on Wellesley Island in 1951, and opened Wellesley Island State Park in 1954. The park was preceded by two other state parks on Wellesley Island, Dewolf Point and Waterson Point, both of which were established in 1898 as part of the St. Lawrence Reservation.

In 2004, Reserve America named Wellesley Island State Park one of the top 100 campgrounds in the nation.

== Activities and services ==
Wellesley Island State Park offers swimming at a life guarded beach, hiking, hunting and fishing, cross-country skiing, biking and recreation programs. The park includes a nature trail, the Minna Anthony Common Nature Center, a marina and three boat launches (power boats permitted), a nine-hole golf course, cabins, camping and a dump station, showers, picnic tables, a playground, and a food concession with attached recreation area. Several of the hiking trails overlook Eel Bay. Archery and muzzle loading are allowed in designated areas.

== See also ==
- List of New York state parks
