= Hill Island (Ontario) =

River island in the St Lawrence River, Ontario, Canada

Coordinates: 44.3533°N 75.9608°W

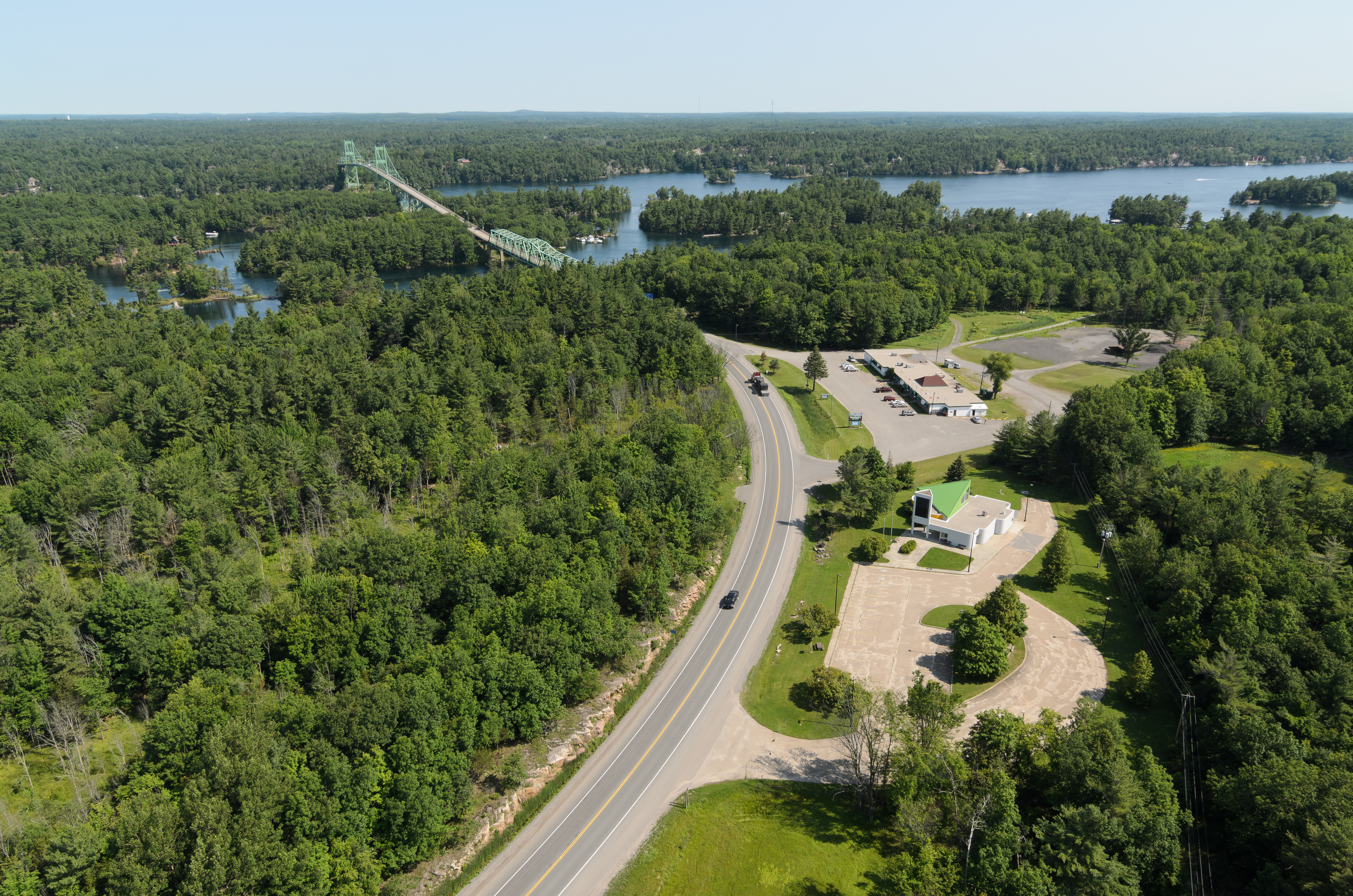
Hill Island as seen from the 1000 Islands Tower

Hill Island is an island in the Thousand Islands archipelago on the St. Lawrence River between Ontario, Canada and the U.S. state of New York. It is located on the Canadian side of the Canada–US border and separated from Wellesley Island on the U.S. side by the International Rift. Hill Island is southwest of Rockport and southeast of Lansdowne and Ivy Lea on the Canadian mainland. Hill Island is part of the Lansdowne postal area (postal code K0E 1L0), located in the township of Leeds and the Thousand Islands in the United Counties of Leeds and Grenville, Ontario.

Highway 137 provides vehicular access to Hill Island as part of the Thousand Islands Bridge system, connecting Interstate 81 in New York State, with the Thousand Islands Parkway and Highway 401 on the Canadian mainland.

The 1000 Islands Tower is an observation tower on the island providing panoramic views.
