= Sweets Corners, Ontario =

Sweets Corners, Ontario may refer to:

- Sweets Corners, Haldimand County, Ontario
- Sweets Corners, Leeds and Grenville United Counties, Ontario
