= Lyndhurst Bridge =

- Coordinates: 44°32′59″N 76°07′32″W
- Carries: motor vehicles
- Crosses: Gananoque River

History
- Construction end: 1857

Location
- Interactive map of Lyndhurst Bridge

Lyndhurst bridge is reportedly the oldest surviving bridge in Ontario, Canada, having been completed in 1857. It is located in the community of Lyndhurst, in the township of Leeds and the Thousand Islands. The bridge is a three span stone arch bridge. The bridge, constructed of local sandstone, was designed by John Donald Roddick, a local mill owner, and was built by Miles Fulford and Simon Ransom. In 1986 the bridge was altered by the addition of an interior frame of load-bearing reinforced concrete inside the deck system. It carries Lyndhurst Road in a single lane across the Gananoque River.
