= Irwin Brothers Store =

Historic commercial building in New York, United States

- U.S. National Register of Historic Places
- Location within New York Location within the United States
- Location: NY 180, Stone Mills, New York
- Coordinates: 44°6′46″N 75°58′34″W
- Area: 1.8 acres (0.73 ha)
- Built: 1823 - ca.1850
- Architectural style: Greek Revival, Federal
- NRHP reference No.: 83001681
- Added to NRHP: September 15, 1983

Irwin Brothers Store is a historic commercial building located at Stone Mills in Jefferson County, New York. It was built in phases between 1823 and approximately 1850. It is a two-story, nine bay structure constructed of locally quarried blue limestone. Also on the property is a late 19th-century carriage barn. The property was purchased in 1978 by the Northern New York Agricultural Historical Society for use as a rural museum.

It was listed on the National Register of Historic Places in 1983.
