= Thousand Islands Bridge =

Bridge linking Canada and the U.S.

Thousand Islands International Bridge
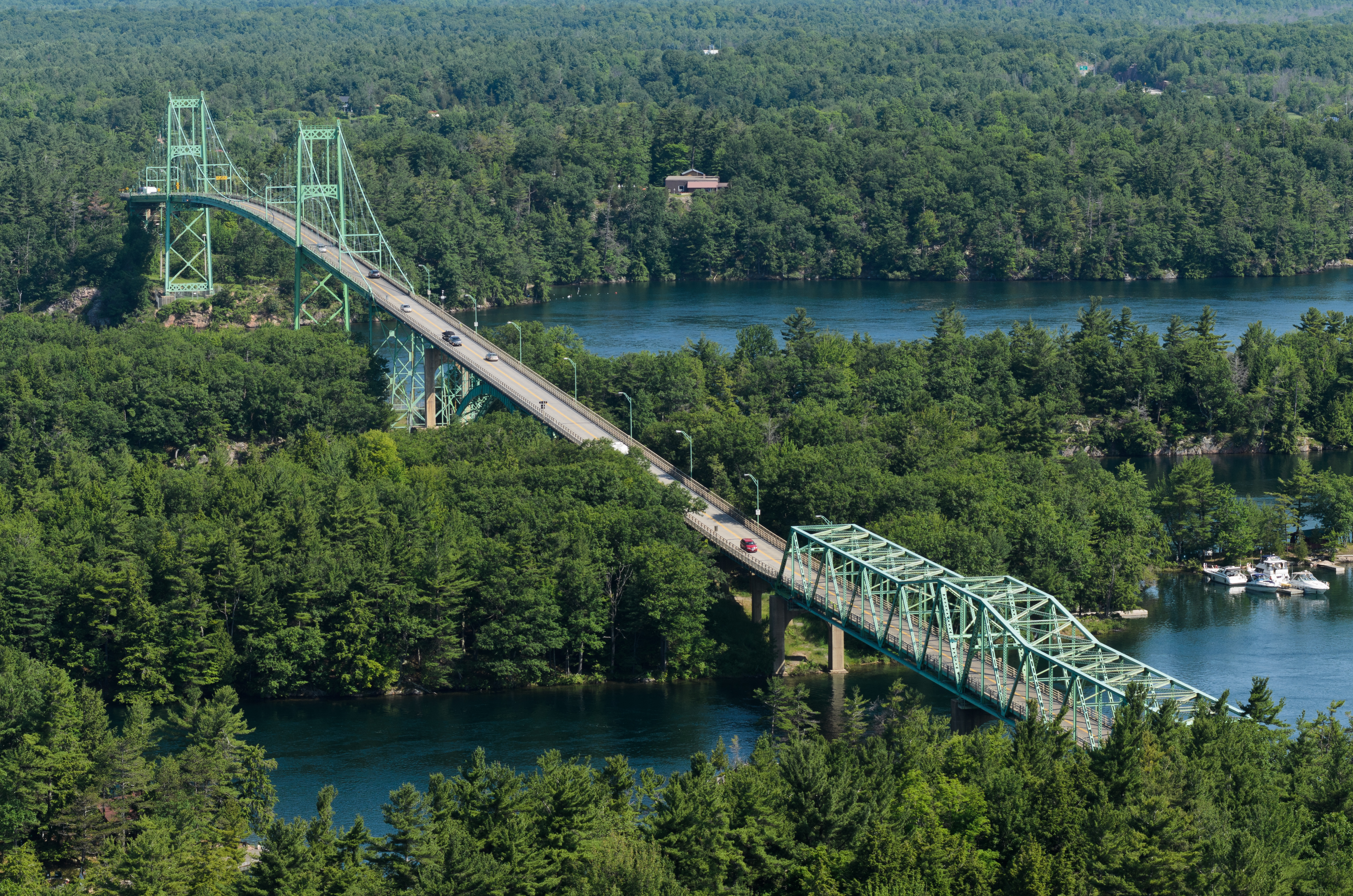
- A view of the Canadian parts of the bridge system as ON-137 traverses the St Lawrence River across Constance Island and then Georgina Island to reach Ontario mainland. Picture taken looking north from 1000 Islands Tower.
- Coordinates: 44°20′50.71″N 75°59′0.6″W
- Carries: 2 lanes of I-81 and Highway 137
- Crosses: Saint Lawrence River
- Locale: Wellesley Island, New York, United States to Hill Island, Ontario, Canada
- Official name: The Thousand Islands Bridge system
- Owner: Federal Bridge Corporation; Thousand Islands Bridge Authority
- Maintained by: Thousand Islands Bridge Authority

Characteristics
- Design: suspension, open-spandrel deck arch bridge & truss bridge
- Total length: Total: 8.5 mi (13.7 km)
- Longest span: American suspension: 800 ft (240 m); Canadian suspension: 750 ft (230 m); Canadian truss: 600 ft (180 m)
- Clearance below: U.S.: 150 ft (46 m); Canada: 120 ft (37 m)

History
- Construction start: April 30, 1937; 89 years ago
- Opened: August 18. 1938; 88 years ago

Statistics
- Toll: Varies $4.00–$26.00 (USD) or $5.00–$33.50 (CAD)

Location
- Interactive map of Thousand Islands International Bridge

The Thousand Islands International Bridge (French: Pont des Mille-îles) is an American-maintained international bridge system over the Saint Lawrence River connecting northern New York in the United States with southeastern Ontario in Canada. Constructed in 1937, with additions in 1959, the bridges span the Canada–US border in the middle of the Thousand Islands region. All bridges in the system carry two lanes of traffic, one in each direction, with pedestrian sidewalks.

== Structure ==
The Thousand Islands International Bridge system is a series of five bridges spanning the St. Lawrence River. From south to north, they are:

1. American mainland to Wellesley Island (main span)
2. Wellesley Island to Hill Island (international crossing)
3. Hill Island to Constance Island
4. Constance Island to Georgina Island
5. Georgina Island to Canadian mainland

The system's southern end connects with Interstate 81 and the northern end with Highway 401 via Highway 137. There is also an interchange with the Thousand Islands Parkway on the Ontario side.

The actual international border bridge crossing is a set of two parallel 90 ft (27 m) bridges between Wellesley Island in the United States and Hill Island in Canada.

== Administration ==
The bridge system is jointly owned by the Thousand Islands Bridge Authority, a New York State public benefit corporation whose seven board members (four Americans and three Canadians) are appointed by the Jefferson County Board of Legislators, and the Federal Bridge Corporation, a Crown corporation owned by the Canadian federal government. The TIBA is responsible for management and operation of the bridge.

The TIBA also maintains and administers Boldt Castle.

Tolls are paid only by cash, E-ZPass, or Commuter Discount Fare Trip Tags, which are prepaid for 72 trips (US$48.00). The Bridge Authority is a member of the multi-state E-ZPass consortium, and introduced electronic toll collection in June 2019. No other ETC transponders are currently offered or accepted, although the Bridge Authority offers sales of transponders of Florida's SunPass for the convenience of Canadian travellers en route to Florida.

== Border crossing ==
The Thousand Islands Border Crossing connects the towns of Alexandria Bay, New York, and Ivy Lea, Ontario, at the Thousand Islands Bridge.

It is the westernmost of the three St. Lawrence River crossings, and is very busy, with up to two-hour waits in the summer. The US border station at Alexandria Bay is sometimes called Thousand Islands. The Canada border station of Lansdowne is sometimes called Gananoque, for the nearby town where international ferry service is provided. These border stations are also responsible for inspecting vessel traffic between the countries. The US has seasonal vessel inspection stations on Heart Island and at Cape Vincent, New York, and Canada has seasonal vessel inspection stations at Rockport, Ontario, and Gananoque, Ontario. Both Canada Border Services Agency (CBSA) and the U.S. Customs and Border Protection (CBP) travel to selected ports and marinas on request for inspections.

== History ==
The entire Thousand Islands Bridge system took sixteen months to build, beginning with a ground-breaking on April 30, 1937. Completed ten weeks ahead of schedule, the bridges opened on August 18, 1938, with the ribbon cut by President Franklin D. Roosevelt and Prime Minister William Lyon Mackenzie King. Its total cost was $3.05 million (equivalent to $52.14 million in 2024 dollars).

Shortly after opening, the bridge displayed aerodynamic oscillation problems that were quickly corrected via structural upgrades.

In its first year of operation, over 118,000 vehicles crossed the bridge. As of 2019, annual crossings exceeded 2,000,000 vehicles.

== Gallery ==
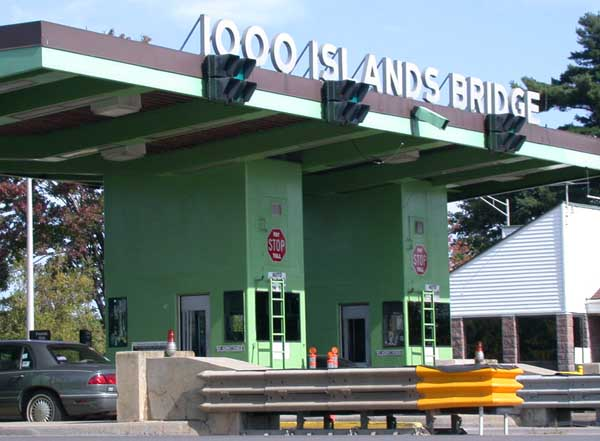
Toll plaza on the Thousand Islands Bridge

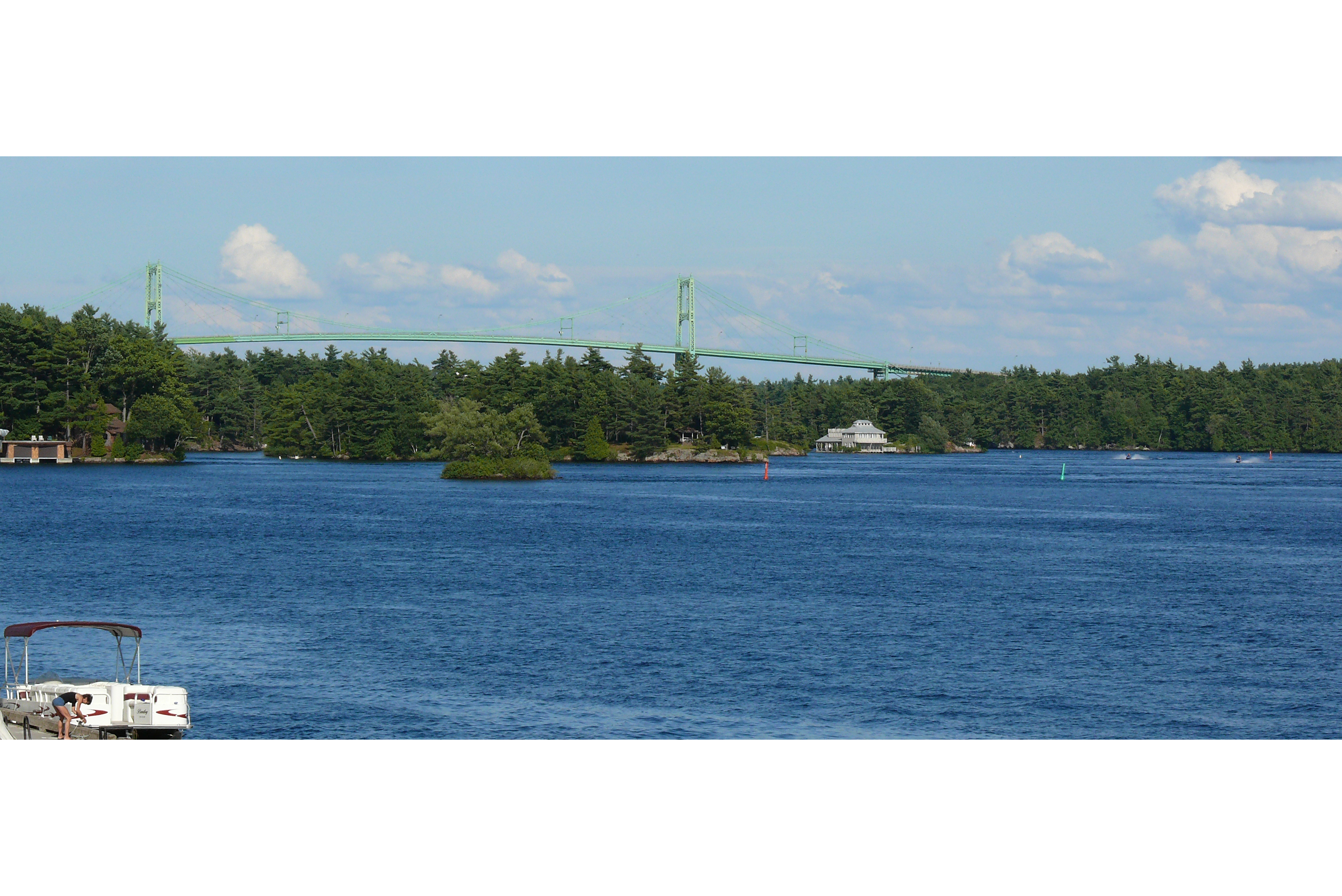
Thousand Island bridge view from Ivy Lea

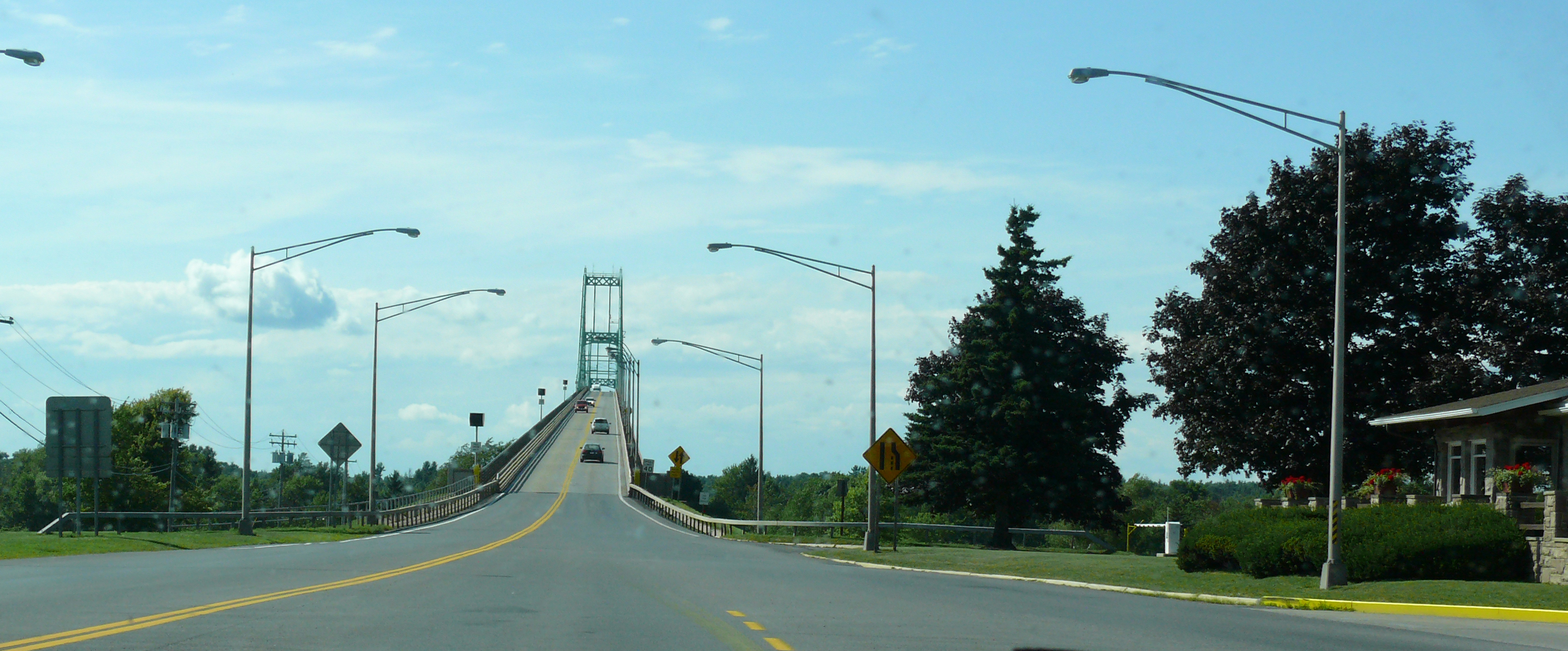
Thousand Islands Bridge

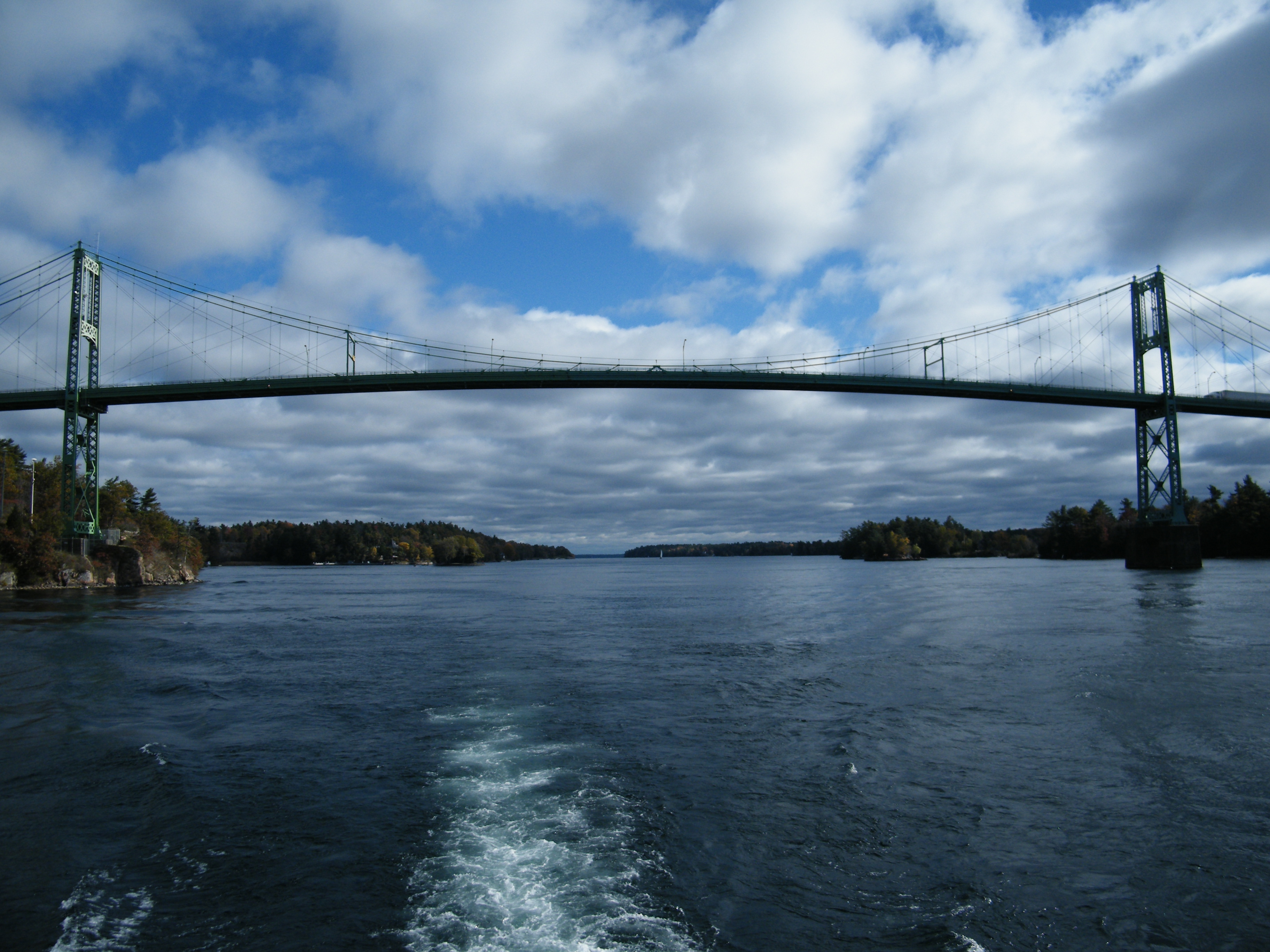
Thousand Islands Bridge from river

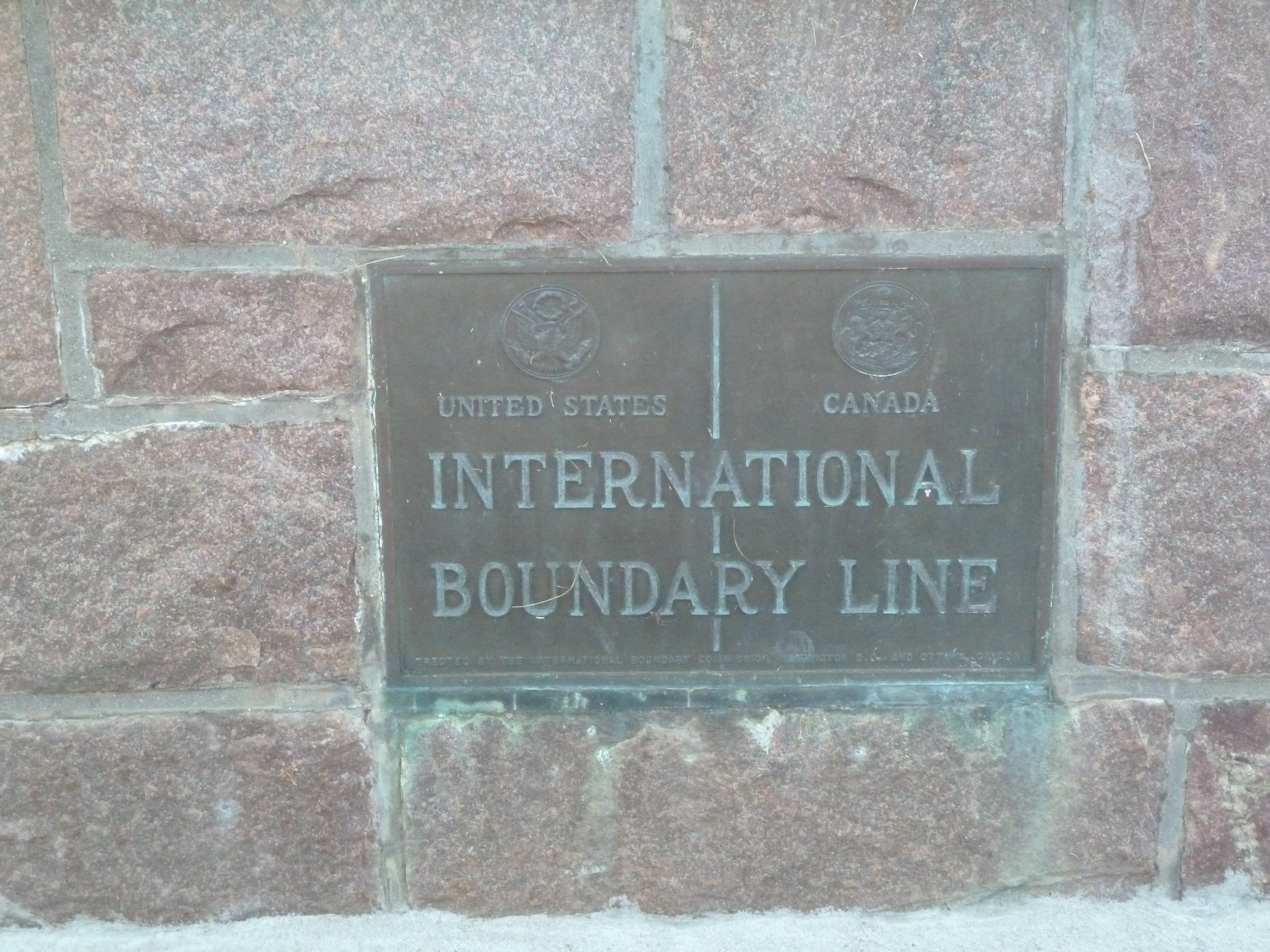
The international boundary plaque on the bridge

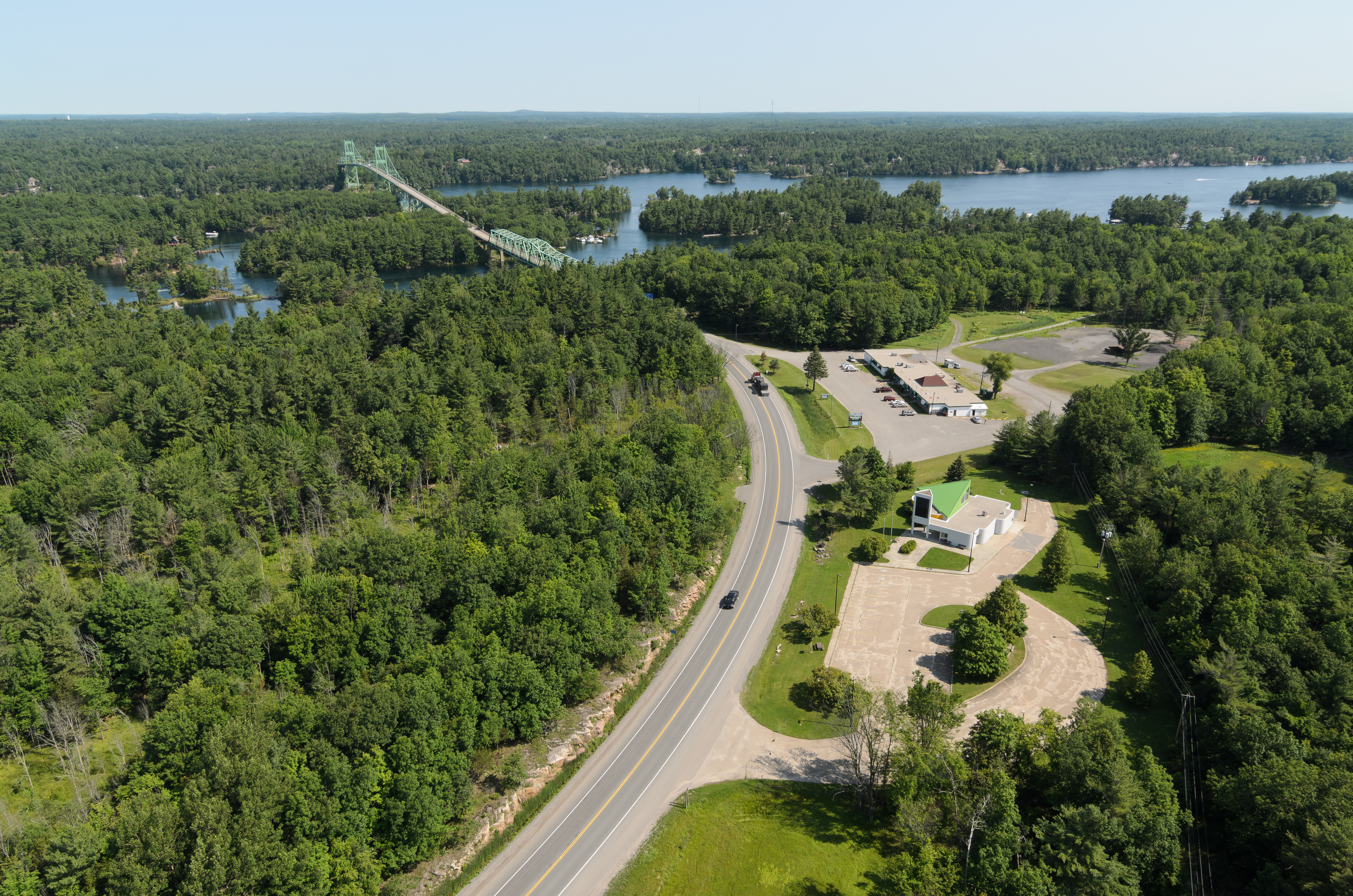
Portion of ON-137 on Hill Island

== See also ==
- List of bridges in Canada
- List of crossings of the Saint Lawrence River and the Great Lakes
- List of international bridges in North America
- Boldt Castle (landmark owned by the Thousand Islands Bridge Authority)
- Dewolf Point State Park
- Sewells Road Bridge
- Ogdensburg–Prescott International Bridge
- Ambassador Bridge
- Buffalo and Fort Erie Public Bridge Authority
