= Waterson Point State Park =

Park in New York, USA

- Location within New York
- Type: State park
- Location: 44927 Cross Island Road; Fineview, New York
- Coordinates: 44°20′19″N 76°00′26″W
- Area: 6 acres (2.4 ha)
- Created: 1898
- Operator: New York State Office of Parks, Recreation and Historic Preservation
- Visitors: 1,600 (in 2014)
- Open: Mid-May through Labor Day
- Website: Waterson Point State Park

Waterson Point State Park is a six-acre (2.4 ha) state park located on Wellesley Island in the St. Lawrence River in the Town of Orleans in Jefferson County, New York. It is near Wellesley Island State Park.

The park was established in 1898 as part of the St. Lawrence Reservation.

== Description ==
Waterson Point State Park is a small boater's park in the Thousand Islands. It offers dockage for 30 boats, fishing, and picnic tables. The park is accessible only by boat.

== See also ==
- List of New York state parks
