= Stone Mills Union Church =

Historic church in New York, United States

- U.S. National Register of Historic Places
- Location within New York Location within the United States
- Location: NY 180 near jct. with Carter St., Stone Mills, New York
- Coordinates: 44°6′52″N 75°58′27″W
- Area: 2.5 acres (1.0 ha)
- Built: 1837
- Architectural style: Greek Revival
- NRHP reference No.: 76001223
- Added to NRHP: December 12, 1976

Stone Mills Union Church is a historic church at Stone Mills in Jefferson County, New York. It was built in 1837.

The church is a long, three bay, rectangular structure built of carefully dressed walls of gray limestone. It is covered by a gable roof and the front elevation features a two-story pedimented pavilion two bays in width. Atop the pavilion is a simple belfry covered by a low pyramidal roof. It was listed on the National Register of Historic Places in 1976.

Since 1968 it has served as headquarters for the Stone Mill Museum of the Northern New York Agricultural Historical Society. The museum includes a sawmill, granary, school house, display buildings and farm machinery.
