= Orleans, New York =

Town in Jefferson County, New York, US

- Town
- Location within New York Location within the United States
- Coordinates: 44°14′39″N 75°58′37″W
- Country: United States
- State: New York
- County: Jefferson

Government
  - Type: Town Council
  - Town Supervisor: Donna Chatterton (D)
  - Town Council: Members' List: • Peter Davis (R); • Kevin Rarick (R); • Peter Wilson (R); • Gwendolyn Kirkby (D)

Area
  - Total: 77.73 sq mi (201.31 km^{2})
  - Land: 71.25 sq mi (184.53 km^{2})
  - Water: 6.47 sq mi (16.77 km^{2})
- Elevation: 381 ft (116 m)

Population (2010)
  - Total: 2,789
  - Estimate (2016): 2,767
  - Density: 38.8/sq mi (14.99/km^{2})
- Time zone: UTC-5 (Eastern (EST))
  - Summer (DST): UTC-4 (EDT)
- ZIP Codes: 13640 (Wellesley Island); 13641 (Fishers Landing); 13656 (La Fargeville); 13692 (Thousand Island Park); 13601 (Watertown); 13607 (Alexandria Bay); 13691 (Theresa)
- FIPS code: 36-045-55398
- GNIS feature ID: 0979319
- Website: www.townoforleans.com

Orleans is a town in Jefferson County, New York, United States. The population was 2,789 at the 2010 census, up from 2,463 in 2000. The town is located in the northern part of the county and is north of Watertown. Orleans is named after the commune of Orléans in France.

== History ==
The Oneida tribe granted land, a 100-square-mile (260 km^{2}) tract, in the town to Peter Penet in 1788. The town was first settled around 1806.

The community of La Fargeville was founded around 1816 by the construction of a mill on the Chaumont River.

The town of Orleans was formed from part of the town of Brownville in 1821 at the same time as some other new towns.

Fordham University was founded as St. John's College in La Fargeville in 1838 by a purchase of the lands and home of John La Farge. The college moved to New York City after a few years.

The Irwin Brothers Store and Stone Mills Union Church are listed on the National Register of Historic Places.

== Geography ==
According to the United States Census Bureau, the town has a total area of 78.0 square miles (202.1 km^{2}), of which 71.4 square miles (185.0 km^{2}) are land and 6.6 square miles (17.1 km^{2}), or 8.48%, are water. Part of the town is located on the St. Lawrence River and includes part of Wellesley Island, containing Dewolf Point State Park. The northern town line is the international border with Canada (Ontario).

Interstate 81, a major divided highway, passes through the town to the Canada–US border. New York State Route 12 follows the south bank of the St. Lawrence River and intersects New York State Route 180, a north–south highway, at Fishers Landing. New York State Route 411 is an east–west highway in the southern part of Orleans.

== Demographics ==
Historical population
Census	Pop.	Note	%±
1830	3,101		—
1840	3,001		−3.2%
1850	3,265		8.8%
1860	2,934		−10.1%
1870	2,445		−16.7%
1880	2,318		−5.2%
1890	2,196		−5.3%
1900	2,367		7.8%
1910	2,160		−8.7%
1920	1,869		−13.5%
1930	1,790		−4.2%
1940	1,664		−7.0%
1950	1,807		8.6%
1960	1,982		9.7%
1970	1,927		−2.8%
1980	2,007		4.2%
1990	2,248		12.0%
2000	2,463		9.6%
2010	2,789		13.2%
2016 (est.)	2,767		−0.8%
U.S. Decennial Census

As of the census of 2000, there were 2,465 people, 928 households, and 703 families residing in the town. The population density was 34.7 inhabitants per square mile (13.4/km^{2}). There were 2,084 housing units at an average density of 29.3 per square mile (11.3/km^{2}). The racial makeup of the town was 97.20% White, 0.77% African American, 0.77% Native American, 0.20% Asian, 0.24% Pacific Islander, 0.16% from other races, and 0.65% from two or more races. Hispanic or Latino of any race were 0.57% of the population.

There were 928 households, out of which 35.5% had children under the age of 18 living with them, 62.1% were married couples living together, 9.1% had a female householder with no husband present, and 24.2% were non-families. 19.6% of all households were made up of individuals, and 8.1% had someone living alone who was 65 years of age or older. The average household size was 2.65 and the average family size was 2.99.

In the town, the population was spread out, with 27.2% under the age of 18, 6.7% from 18 to 24, 29.6% from 25 to 44, 24.3% from 45 to 64, and 12.2% who were 65 years of age or older. The median age was 37 years. For every 100 females, there were 102.5 males. For every 100 females age 18 and over, there were 97.8 males.

The median income for a household in the town was $36,458, and the median income for a family was $41,471. Males had a median income of $28,828 versus $22,132 for females. The per capita income for the town was $17,315. About 8.8% of families and 12.2% of the population were below the poverty line, including 19.9% of those under age 18 and 7.5% of those age 65 or over.

== Communities and locations in Orleans ==
=== Communities and inhabited locations ===
- Barlow Corners – A location in the southeastern corner of the town on County Road 15.
- Collins Landing – A community on the southern shore of the St. Lawrence River, across from Wellesley Island.
- DeLaFarge Corners – A hamlet on the eastern town line on County Road 3.
- Dewolf Point State Park – a state park on Wellesley Island by Lake of the Isles.
- Fineview – A location on the south shore of Wellesley Island on County Road 100.
- Fishers Landing – A hamlet and census-designated place in the northern part of town by the St. Lawrence River, on Routes NY-12 and NY-180.
- Getman Corners – A location in the southeastern part of the town on County Road 15.
- Grass Point State Park – A state park in the northern part of the town, off NY-12.
- Grenell – A community on Wellesley Island north of Thousand Islands Park.
- Grandview Park – a community on the northwestern tip of Wellesley Island.
- La Fargeville – A hamlet and census-designated place at the intersection of Routes NY-180 and NY-411, along with County Road 181.
- Moore Landing – A location on the southern shore of Wellesley Island.
- Omar – A hamlet in the northern part of the town on Route 180. The community was once called "Mudges Mills".
- Orleans Corners (or "Orleans Four Corners," formerly "Shantyville") – A location in the eastern part of the town on NY-411 at County Road 15.
- Stone Mills – A hamlet in the southwestern corner of the town on Route 180.
- Thousand Island Park – A hamlet and census-designated place on the southwestern tip of Wellesley Island by South Bay.
- Waterson Point State Park – A state park on the northern shore of Wellesley Island.
- Wellesley Island State Park – A state park on Wellesley Island.

=== Geographic locations ===
- American Narrows – A narrow channel of the St. Lawrence River that flows between Wellesley Island and the mainland of New York.
- Chaumont River – A stream in the southern part of Orleans, flowing past La Fargeville.
- Collins Landing Wildlife Management Area – A conservation area by the St. Lawrence River.
- Crow Island – A small island by the north shore of Wellesley Island.
- Eel Bay – A bay at the western end of Wellesley Island.
- Mullet Creek – A stream entering the St. Lawrence River at Fishers Landing.
- Lake of the Isles – A bay formed by two arms of Wellesley Island.
- South Bay – A bay on the southwestern corner of Wellesley Island.
- Wellesley Island – An island in the St. Lawrence River, partly in the town of Orleans.
