= Dewolf Point State Park =

Park in New York, USA

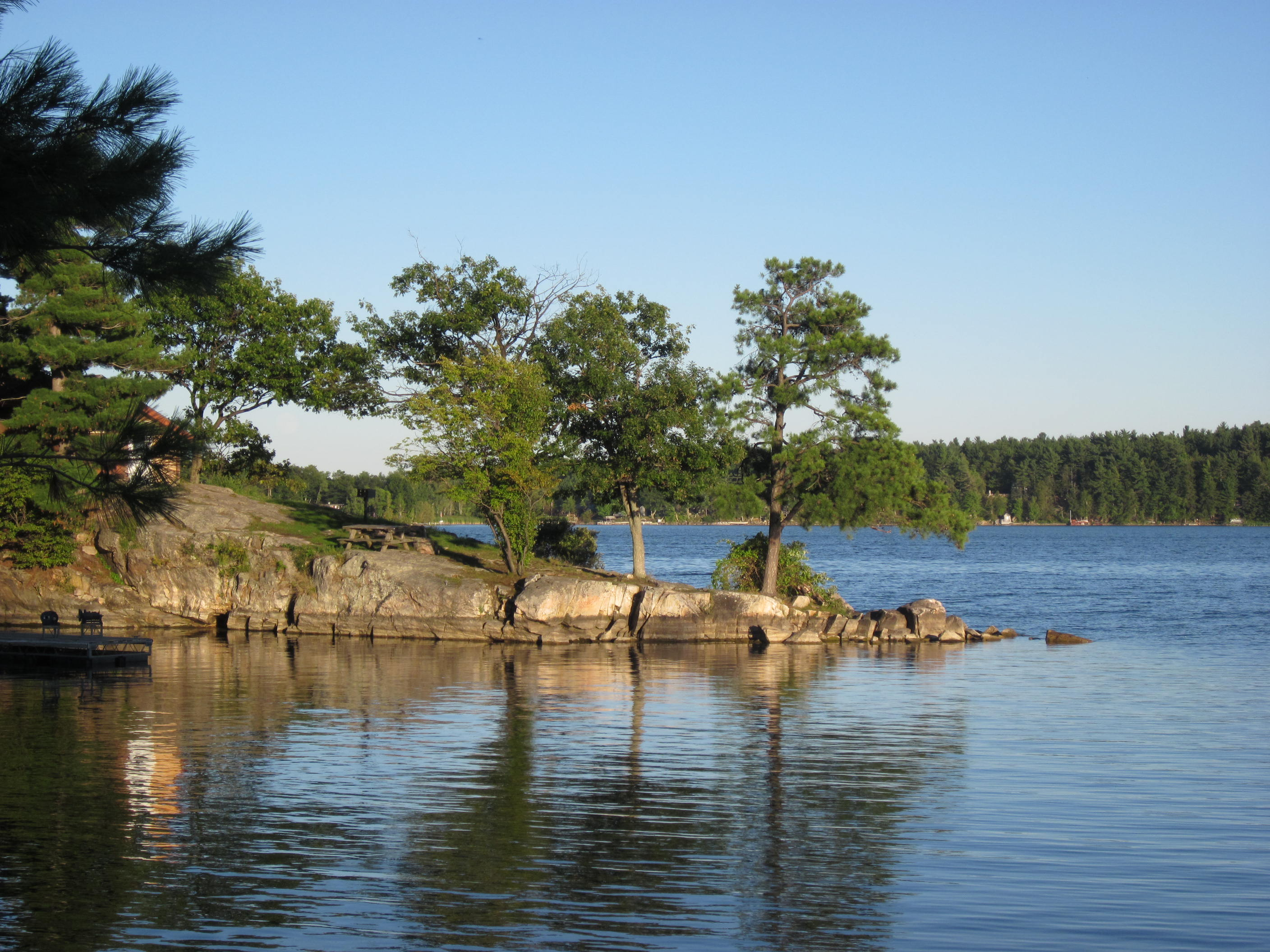
- Dewolf Point State Park, September 2011

- Location within New York
- Type: State park
- Location: 45920 Country Route 191; Fineview, New York
- Nearest city: Alexandria Bay, New York
- Coordinates: 44°19′56″N 75°59′33″W
- Area: 13 acres (0.053 km^{2})
- Created: 1898
- Operator: New York State Office of Parks, Recreation and Historic Preservation
- Visitors: 15,893 (in 2014)
- Open: Late April to mid-September
- Website: Dewolf Point State Park

Dewolf Point State Park is a 13-acre (0.053 km^{2}) state park on Wellesley Island in the St. Lawrence River. The park is situated within the Town of Orleans in Jefferson County, New York. The park was established in 1898 as part of the St. Lawrence Reservation.

== Park description ==
Facilities offered by the park include a gazebo, a boat launch and docks, cabins, fishing, picnic tables, and a campground with tent and trailer sites. The park has views overlooking Lake of the Isles.

The park is easily accessible to visitors, being close to Interstate 81, which links northwards to Highway 401 in Ontario, Canada. The park is the first recreational area which visitors from Canada come to, when crossing into the United States over the Thousand Islands Bridge.

The park is open from late April to mid-September.

== See also ==
- List of New York state parks
