= Wellesley Island =

Island in Jefferson County, New York, United States

Map of Wellesley Island

Wellesley Island is an island in the St. Lawrence River in Jefferson County, New York. The island is partially in the Town of Orleans and partially in the Town of Alexandria.

== History ==
The island was originally named Wells Island. During the 1815 survey of the US-Canada border by Captain William Fitzwilliam Owen, the island was renamed to its current name to honor Arthur Wellesley, 1st Duke of Wellington. Several prominent points in and around the island were named after the Duke's victorious battles. None of those names stuck. The large bay around which the island folds is called Lake of the Isles, not Lake Waterloo.

== Geography ==
The island is located 44°19′N 76°00′W in the St. Lawrence River, which surrounds Wellesley Island on three sides. The island bounds an internal body of water, the Lake of the Isles, which nearly doubles its waterfront. The easternmost peninsula of the island lies across the Upper (American) Narrows from the Village of Alexandria Bay.

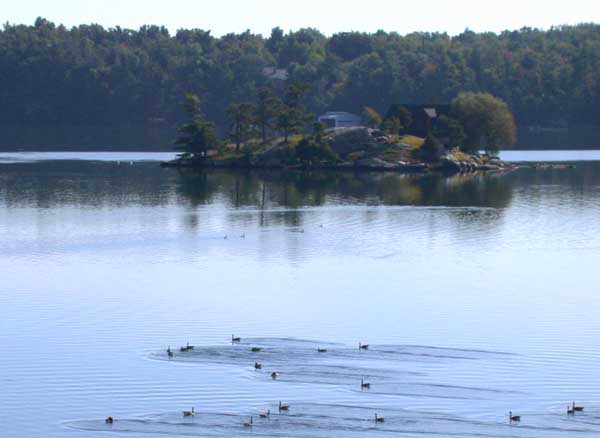
View of Dukeman's Island, located in the middle of Wellesley Island's interior Lake of the Isles

An arterial highway, Interstate 81, crosses Wellesley Island. Five segments composing the Thousand Islands International Bridge link the island to the opposite shores of the river. One of the bridges crosses a narrow channel, the International Rift, which separates Wellesley Island in the United States from Hill Island in the township of Leeds and the Thousand Islands, Ontario, Canada. The United States border-crossing facility at the port of entry is located on the northeastern part of the island.

Wellesley is one of the largest of the Thousand Islands in the St. Lawrence River. Population increases dramatically during the summer months. The island has two State Parks, a nature center, and three golf courses. Located on its southern tip is Thousand Island Park, listed on the National Register of Historic Places in 1982. In addition to Interstate 81, which connects two portions of the Thousand Islands Bridge, Jefferson County Routes 100 and 191 serve the island.

== Geographic features ==
- Barnett Marsh—A swamp in the south part of the island.
- Densmore Bay—A bay on the south shore of the southeast peninsula.
- Eel Bay—A large bay between Wellesley Island and Grindstone Island.
- Lake of the Isles—A body of water connected to the St. Lawrence River, lying between the northeast and southeast peninsulas.
- South Bay—A bay on the southwest part of the island.

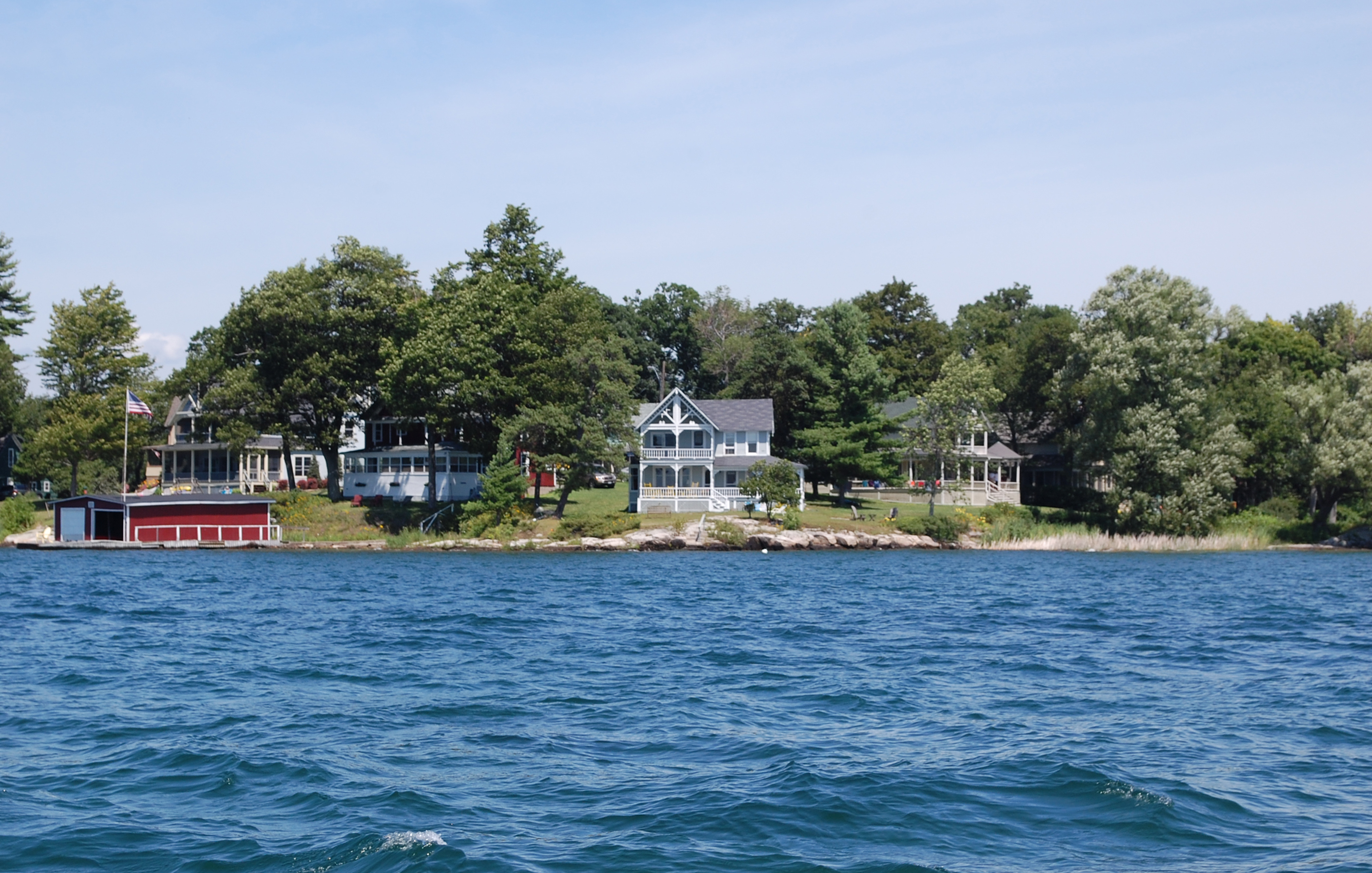
Victorian homes typical of the Thousand Island Park community on the south west tip of Wellesley Island.

== Communities on the island ==
- Grandview
- Moore Landing
- Fineview
- Thousand Island Park
- Westminster Park

== Parks on the island ==
- Wellesley Island State Park—In several locations on the island.
- Dewolf Point State Park—Along Lake of the Isles on the southeast side of the northern peninsula.
- Waterson Point State Park—On the northern edge of the island near the Canada–US border.
- Mary Island State Park—Not actually on Wellesley Island but accessible only by water, this park is separated by a small channel from the easternmost tip of Wellesley Island
