= 1000 Islands Tower =

Coordinates: 44°21′09″N 75°58′44″W

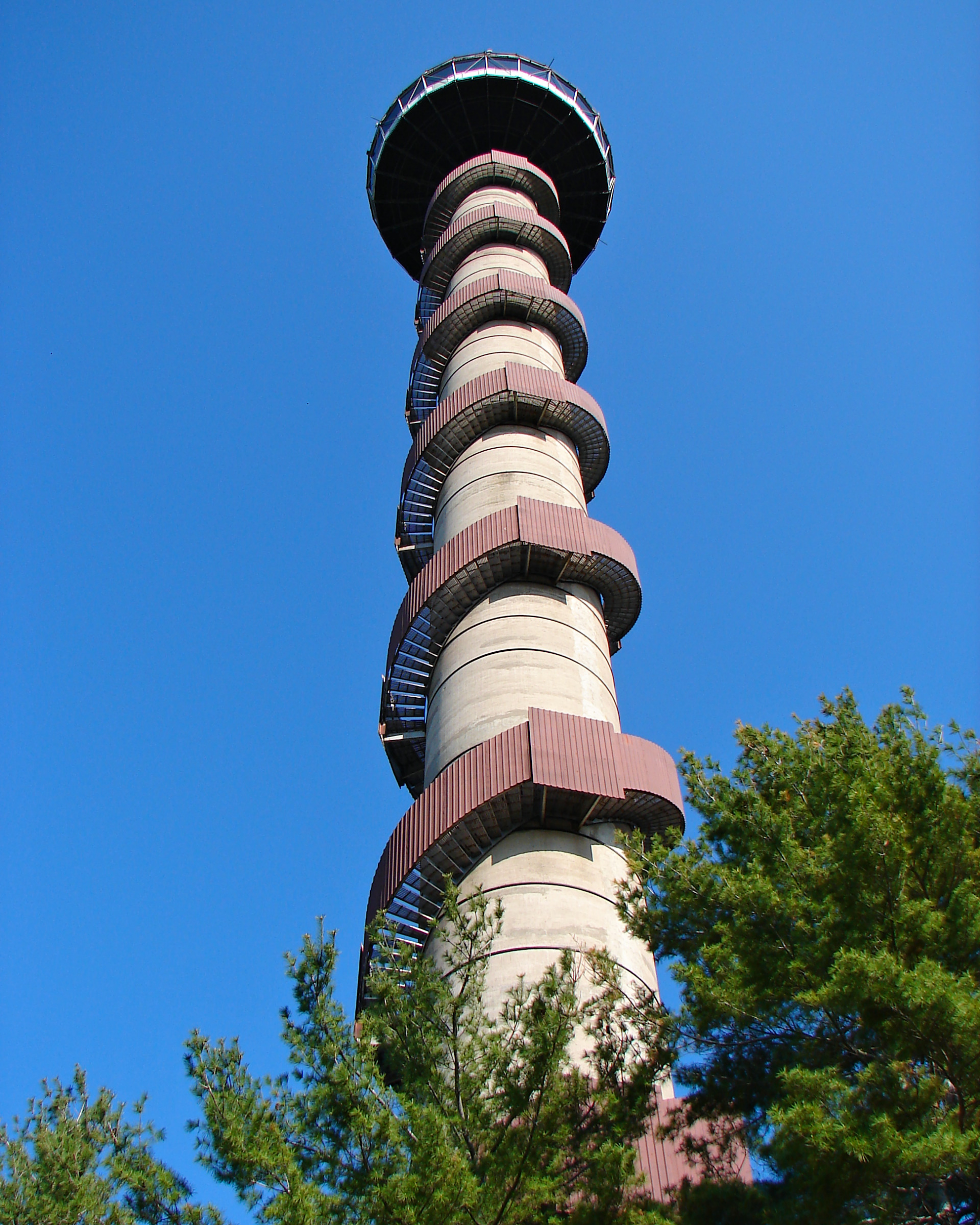
1000 Islands Tower

The 1000 Islands Tower is a concrete observation tower, on Hill Island, in Ontario, about 620 meters from the border of New York State. Built and opened on June 15, 1965, the tower provides panoramic views over the Thousand Islands of both countries, from a height of 400 feet (120 m) above the St. Lawrence River.

It is generally open from May to October.

Panoramic view to the northwest

== See also ==
- List of tallest structures in Canada
