= Interstate 81 =

Interstate Highway in eastern US

Interstate 81
- I-81 highlighted in red

Route information
- Length: 855.02 mi (1,376.02 km)
- Existed: August 14, 1957–present
- NHS: Entire route

Major junctions
- South end: I-40 in Dandridge, TN
- I-26 / US 23 in Kingsport, TN; I-77 from Wytheville, VA to Fort Chiswell, VA; I-64 from Lexington, VA to Staunton, VA; I-70 at Hagerstown, MD; I-83 / US 22 / US 322 in Harrisburg, PA; I-78 in Union Township, PA; I-80 in Drums, PA; I-84 / I-380 / US 6 in Dunmore, PA; I-88 in Chenango, NY; I-90 in DeWitt, NY
- North end: Highway 137 at the Canadian border on Wellesley Island, NY

Location
- Country: United States
- States: Tennessee, Virginia, West Virginia, Maryland, Pennsylvania, New York

Highway system
- Interstate Highway System; Main; Auxiliary; Suffixed; Business; Future

Interstate 81 (I-81) is a north–south (physically northeast–southwest) Interstate Highway in the eastern part of the United States. Its southern terminus is at I-40 in Dandridge, Tennessee; its northern terminus is on Wellesley Island, New York at the Canadian border, where the Thousand Islands Bridge connects it to Highway 137 and ultimately to Highway 401, the main Ontario freeway connecting Detroit via Toronto to Montreal. The major metropolitan areas along the route of I-81 include the Tri-Cities of Tennessee; Roanoke in Virginia; Hagerstown in Maryland; Harrisburg and the Wyoming Valley in Pennsylvania; and Binghamton and Syracuse in New York.

I-81 largely traces the paths created down the length of the Appalachian Mountains through the Great Appalachian Valley by migrating animals, indigenous peoples, and early settlers. It also follows a major corridor for troop movements during the Civil War. These trails and roadways gradually evolved into US Route 11 (US 11); I-81 parallels much of the older US 11. Being mostly rural in nature, I-81 is heavily used as a trucking corridor and is often used as a bypass of the busier and more congested I-95 to the east; for this reason, it is also used heavily by drug and human traffickers, as it is less monitored by law enforcement than I-95. This led to the Federal Bureau of Investigation (FBI) forming a taskforce to combat the issue in 2017.

The I-81 Corridor Coalition, a six-state coalition, was organized to handle issues along I-81, such as truck traffic and air pollution; the commission meets annually. I-81 is part of the fastest route between the capital of the US (Washington, D.C.) and the capital of Canada (Ottawa).

== Route description ==
I-81 is part of the National Highway System, a network of highways that are considered essential to the country's economy, defense, and mobility by the Federal Highway Administration (FHWA).

Lengths
	mi	km
TN	75.66	121.76
VA	324.92	522.91
WV	26.00	41.84
MD	12.08	19.44
PA	232.76	374.59
NY	183.60	295.48
Total	855.02	1,376.02

=== Tennessee ===
I-81 begins in Tennessee at I-40 in Dandridge, a route that connects to Knoxville to the west and Asheville to the east. I-81 meets I-26 and US 23, which go to Kingsport and Johnson City. At milemarker 75, I-81 leaves Tennessee and enters Virginia.

=== Virginia ===
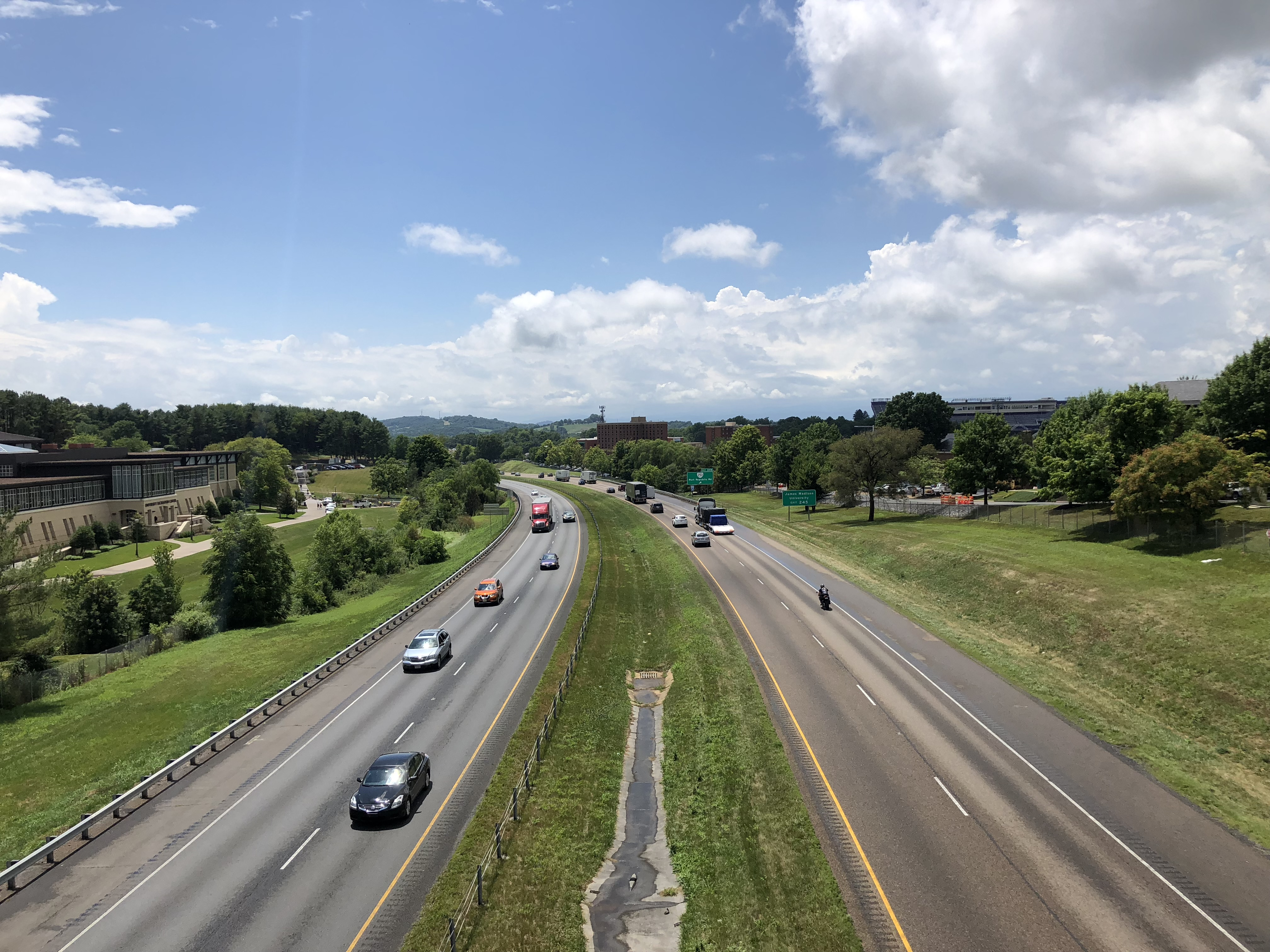
I-81 looking southbound near milepost 245 in Harrisonburg, Virginia

I-81 in Virginia is largely a rural route with brief concurrencies with I-77 and I-64. The route parallels the Appalachian Mountains for much of its route through Tennessee and Virginia, serving such cities as the twin cities of Bristol, Tennessee and Virginia; Wytheville; Roanoke; Christiansburg; Lexington; Staunton; Harrisonburg; and Winchester. In Harrisonburg, I-81 cuts through James Madison University. It parallels its older counterpart, US 11, for its entire length in Virginia.

=== West Virginia ===
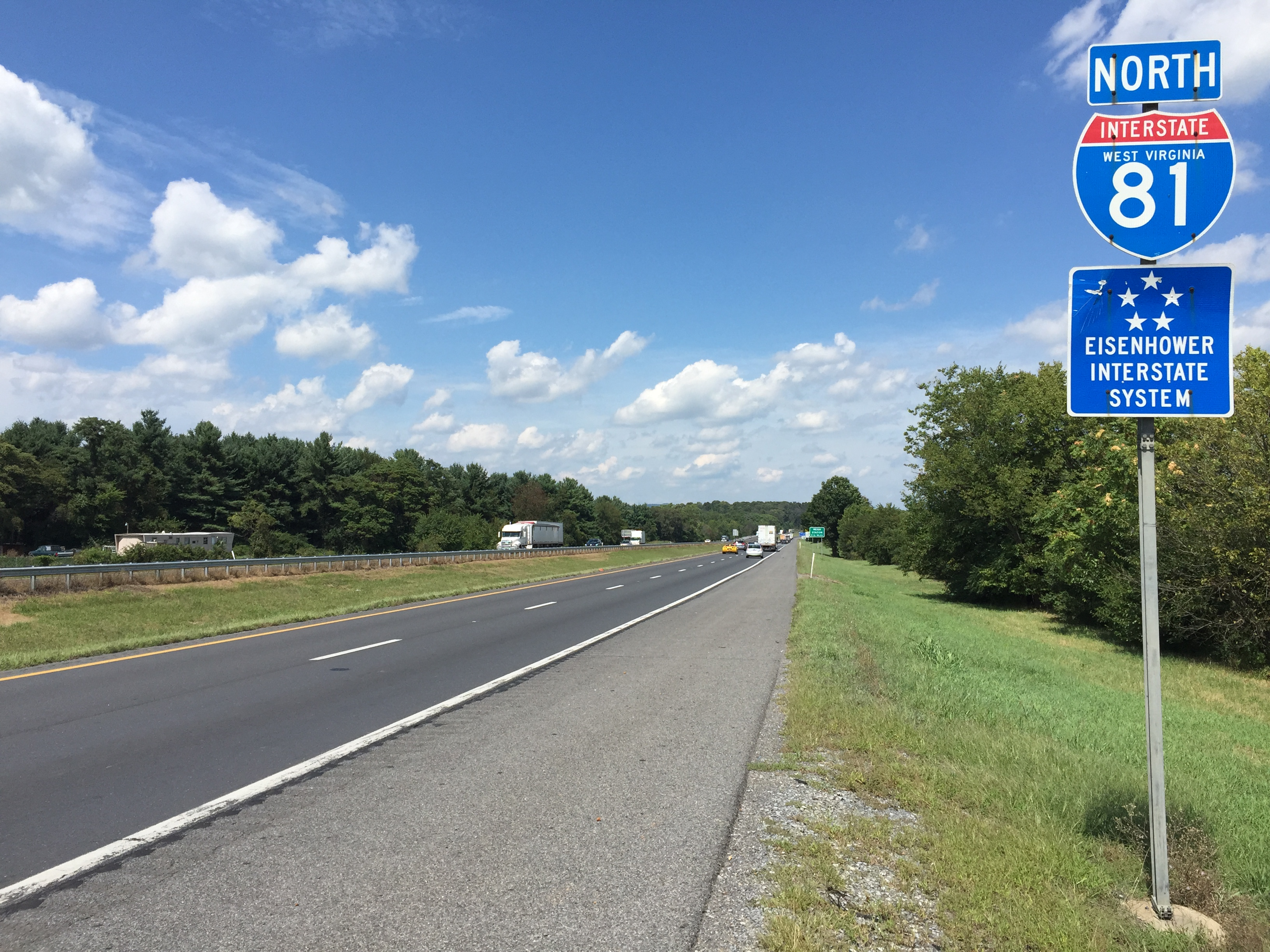
Northbound on I-81 just after entering West Virginia

I-81 briefly enters the Eastern Panhandle of West Virginia for about 26 miles (42 km), serving the city of Martinsburg. The entire route is in Berkeley County and serves the Eastern WV Regional Airport. The West Virginia segment was completed in 1966, and there have been no realignments since.

=== Maryland ===
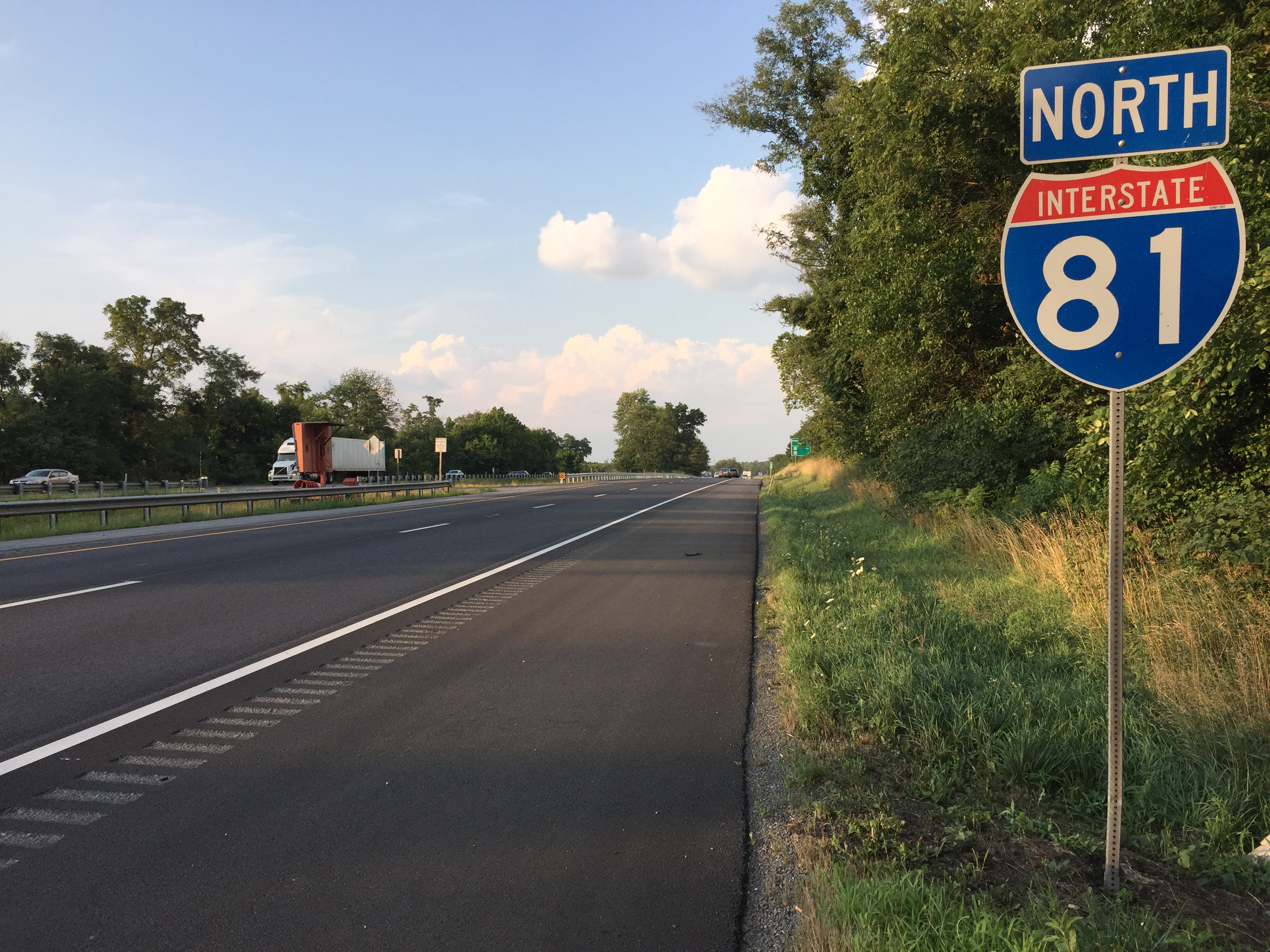
View north along I-81 just north of exit 5 at Halfway Boulevard in Halfway, Maryland

I-81 runs 12.08 miles (19.44 km) in Maryland from the West Virginia state line at the Potomac River in Williamsport north to the Pennsylvania state line near Maugansville. I-81 is the primary north–south Interstate Highway in Washington County, connecting Hagerstown, Maryland, with Chambersburg and Harrisburg, Pennsylvania, to the north and Martinsburg, West Virginia, and Winchester, and Roanoke, Virginia, to the south. It is the shortest mainline Interstate in Maryland and contains the shortest portion of I-81 of all six states through which the Interstate highway passes. The Interstate was dedicated as Maryland Veterans Memorial Highway in 1987. I-81 passes through the state of Maryland at one of its narrowest points, the "Hub City" of Hagerstown, where it intersects with a large number of other routes, most notably I-70. Hagerstown Regional Airport is served by this Interstate Highway.

=== Pennsylvania ===
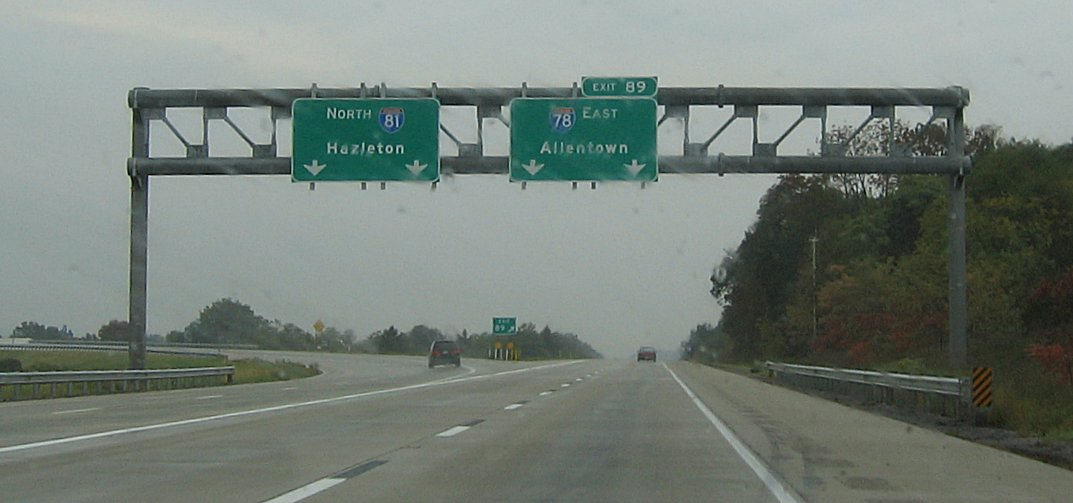
I-81 northbound at western terminus of I-78 in Lebanon County, Pennsylvania

I-81 forms a major north–south corridor through the state of Pennsylvania, serving the boroughs of Chambersburg and Carlisle, where it meets the Pennsylvania Turnpike (I-76) but does not directly interchange with it (motorists must use US 11 to connect). Around the state capital of Harrisburg, the route forms the northern section of Pennsylvania's Capital Beltway. The route then travels northeast toward the Wyoming Valley, where it serves the cities of Wilkes-Barre and Scranton, as well as meeting the PA Turnpike's Northeast Extension, then heads north through the Endless Mountains region toward the state line.

=== New York ===
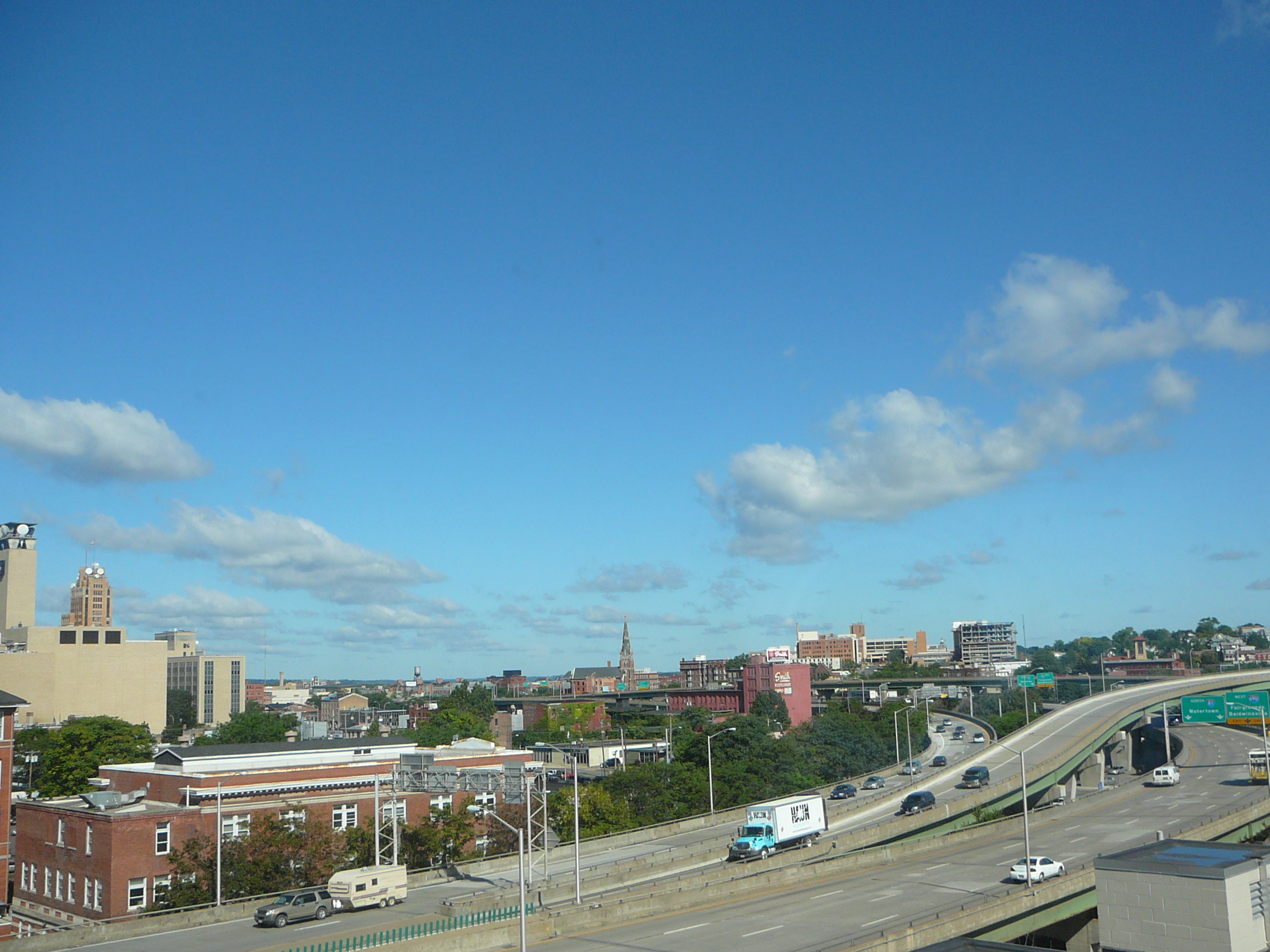
I-81 at I-690 in downtown Syracuse

In New York, I-81 crosses the Pennsylvania state line southeast of Binghamton. The freeway runs north–south through Central New York, serving the cities of Binghamton, Syracuse, and Watertown. It passes through the Thousand Islands in its final miles and crosses two bridges, both part of the series of bridges known as the Thousand Islands Bridge. South of Watertown, I-81 closely parallels US 11, the main north–south highway in Central New York prior to the construction of I-81. At Watertown, US 11 turns northeastward to head across New York's North Country while I-81 continues on a generally northward track to the Canadian border. From there, the road continues into the province of Ontario as Highway 137, a short route leading north to the nearby Highway 401.

== History ==
I-81 roughly parallels the Great Indian Warpath, an old Indian trail that connected New York to the Piedmont region of the southeastern United States via Virginia and West Virginia. A series of roads linking Virginia to Maryland through Martinsburg were present on maps as early as 1873. These trails gradually evolved into the road that became US 11 in 1926. New York was originally served by New York State Route 2 (NY 2), a road built in 1924; NY 2 was replaced by US 11 in 1927. A highway that largely followed the path of US 11 was built and became known as the Penn-Can Highway. A controlled-access highway connecting Knoxville, Tennessee, to Washington, D.C. was proposed in a report called Toll Roads and Free Roads, which was produced by the Bureau of Public Roads (BPR), the predecessor agency to the Federal Highway Administration (FHWA) The full route of the highway that would become I-81 first appeared in the National Interregional Highway Committee's 1944 report titled Interregional Highways. This plan was reaffirmed three years later in a plan produced by the Public Roads Administration of the now-defunct Federal Works Agency. On August 14, 1957, the highway was designated as I-81.

In New York, the first segments of what would become I-81 were begun in 1954. In Maryland, the Interstate was begun with the Hagerstown Bypass in the mid-1950s. After several bouts of expansion, the freeway was completed from US 40 (now Maryland Route 144 [MD 144]) to the Pennsylvania state line in 1958 and marked as I-81 in 1959. Bidding on contracts in West Virginia opened in July 1958. In Virginia, the first Interstate hearing was held in February 1957. At the end of 1957, construction began on a one-mile (1.6 km) stretch near Buchanan, Virginia. A four-mile (6.4 km) section of the Interstate opened in 1959. A stretch in Harrisonburg was opened as well. By late 1963, 85 miles (137 km) in Virginia were open. Construction in Tennessee began in the late 1950s with short sections at each end.

The first statewide segments to be completed were those of West Virginia, both of which were finished on October 19, 1966. In western Maryland, various parts of I-81 were built in the early 1960s, and the remainder of the highway south to the Potomac River was under construction by 1965. Since then, I-81 in Maryland has remained largely unchanged. The final section in New York was a 17-mile (27 km) section, opened on October 18, 1968. The segment in New York cost $270 million (equivalent to $1.85 billion in 2024) to build. The last section of I-81 in Virginia opened on December 21, 1971. In Tennessee, most of I-81 was constructed later than most Interstate Highways in the state. The last section opened partially on December 20, 1974, and opened to all four lanes on August 27, 1975. Most of I-81 in Pennsylvania was complete by the late 1960s, but the last section opened on September 11, 1975, completing the entirety of I-81. The cost of I-81 in Pennsylvania was approximately $380 million (equivalent to $1.72 billion in 2024). The concurrent section with I-77 in Wytheville, Virginia, did not initially meet Interstate Highway standards, and was not upgraded until July 1987.

Since its completion, I-81 has evolved into a de-facto bypass of I-95 and the Northeast megalopolis, the most populous urbanized region in the United States. Much of the route is heavily used by truck traffic to bypass the congestion and toll roads in the northeast urban areas. Since the 1990s, the states along the route have undertaken improvement projects to handle increasing freight volumes, including widening projects, adding truck climbing lanes in mountainous areas, interchange improvements, and diverting some freight movement to rail. In 2007, the I-81 Corridor Coalition was formed by the six states to improve freight movement, traffic safety, and incident management along the corridor. Due to its mostly rural nature, I-81 is also heavily used by criminals for drug and human trafficking. In 2017, the FBI created a task force to deal with the problem. Another major project includes rerouting a controversial section of I-81 in Syracuse that decimated a historic African American neighborhood when it was built. The project began in 2023, after many years of planning and proposals.

== Major intersections ==
Tennessee

- I-40 near Dandridge, northeast of Knoxville
- US 25E at the White Pine–Morristown line
- US 11E in Mosheim
- I-26 / US 23 in Kingsport
- US 11W in Bristol

Virginia

- US 58 / US 421 in Bristol. I-81/US 58 travels concurrently to east of Abingdon
- I-381 in Bristol
- US 11 / US 19 in Bristol
- US 11 east of Abingdon
- US 11 at various locations
- US 21 / US 52 in Wytheville. I-81/US 52 travels concurrently to Fort Chiswell
- I-77 in Wytheville. The highways travel concurrently to Fort Chiswell.
- US 11 / US 460 in Christiansburg
- Future I-73 / I-581 / US 220 in Roanoke
- US 60 southeast of Lexington
- I-64 east of Lexington. The highways travel concurrently to Staunton.
- US 250 in Peyton
- US 33 in Harrisonburg
- US 211 New Market
- I-66 southwest of Middletown
- US 17 / US 50 / US 522 in Winchester

West Virginia

- US 11 north-northeast of Falling Waters

Maryland

- US 11 in Williamsport
- I-70 in Halfway
- US 40 in Hagerstown

Pennsylvania

- US 30 Chambersburg
- US 11 / US 15 north of Enola
- US 22 / US 322 in Harrisburg. I-81/US 322 concurrent throughout Harrisburg.
- I-83 / US 322 in Harrisburg
- I-78 near Jonestown
- US 209 west of Tremont
- I-80 near Hazleton
- I-476 in Dupont (near Pittston)
- I-84 / I-380 / US 6 in Dunmore
- I-476 / US 6 / US 11 in Clarks Summit

New York

- I-86 in Binghamton
- I-88 in Binghamton
- US 11 / US 20 in LaFayette
- I-690 in Syracuse
- I-90 in North Syracuse
- US 11 in Adams
- I-781 in Watertown
- Highway 137 to Highway 401; freeway ends at Canada–US border (Thousand Islands Bridge)

== Auxiliary routes ==
I-81 has six related, auxiliary Interstate Highways that connect the main freeway to downtowns and other cities. I-381 runs 1.5 miles (2.4 km), connecting Bristol, Virginia, to I-81. I-581 is a 6.35-mile-long (10.22 km) spur that connects Roanoke, Virginia, to I-81. It is proposed to be overtaken by I-73. Pennsylvania Route 581 (PA 581) connects Harrisburg, Pennsylvania, to I-81. It runs 7.36 miles (11.84 km). I-481 serves as an eastern bypass of Syracuse, New York. NY 481 is a northwestern extension of I-481 that ends in Oswego. I-781 extends for 4.9 miles (7.9 km), that connects Fort Drum, New York, to the Interstate. NY 281 is a north–south state highway in Central New York that extends for 16.56 miles (26.65 km) across Cortland and Onondaga counties, roughly paralleling I-81 and connecting at both ends.

I-181 was a 23.85-mile (38.38 km) offshoot of I-81, linking to Kingsport and Johnson City, Tennessee. It was partially decommissioned in August 2003 and fully decommissioned in March 2007 when I-26 took over I-181's entire length. I-281 was replaced in January 1970 by I-481. I-81E was replaced by the current I-380.
