= Leeds and the Thousand Islands =

Township in Ontario, Canada

- Township (lower-tier)
- Township of Leeds and the Thousand Islands
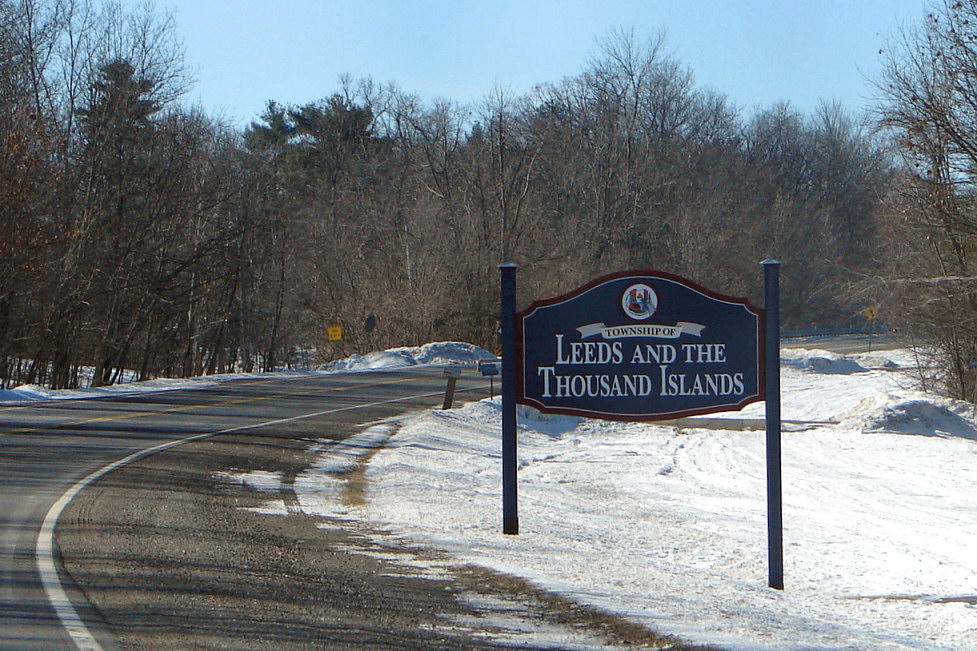
- Welcome sign along Thousand Islands Parkway

- Location within United Counties of Leeds and Grenville Location within Southern Ontario
- Coordinates: 44°29′12″N 076°05′33″W
- Country: Canada
- Province: Ontario
- County: Leeds and Grenville
- Settled: 1790s
- Incorporated: January 1, 2001

Government
  - Mayor: Corinna Smith-Gatcke
  - Fed. riding: Leeds—Grenville—Thousand Islands and Rideau Lakes
  - Prov. riding: Leeds—Grenville—Thousand Islands and Rideau Lakes

Area
  - Land: 608.09 km^{2} (234.78 sq mi)

Population (2021)
  - Total: 9,804
  - Density: 16.1/km^{2} (42/sq mi)
- Time zone: UTC−05:00 (EST)
  - Summer (DST): UTC−04:00 (EDT)
- Postal Code FSA: K0E
- Area codes: 613, 343
- Website: www.leeds1000islands.ca

Leeds and the Thousand Islands is a township in the Canadian province of Ontario, located within the United Counties of Leeds and Grenville. The township is located along the St. Lawrence River, including most of the Canadian Thousand Islands, and extending north into rural hamlets and villages.

The Township of Leeds and the Thousand Islands was formed on January 1, 2001, when three historic townships, Front of Leeds & Lansdowne, Rear of Leeds & Lansdowne, and Front of Escott, were amalgamated. Its services include a public library system and the LTI Archives.

== Communities ==
The township comprises the communities of:

- Berryton
- Black Rapids
- Brier Hill
- Cheeseborough
- Darlingside
- Dulcemaine
- Ebenezer
- Eden Grove
- Ellisville
- Emery
- Escott
- Fairfax
- Gananoque Junction
- Gray's Beach
- Greenfield
- Grenadier Island
- Halsteads Bay
- Holland
- Ivy Lea
- Junetown
- La Rue Mills
- Lansdowne
- Leeds
- Legge
- Long Point
- Lyndhurst
- Maple Grove
- Mitchellville
- Narrows
- Oak Leaf
- Outlet
- Pooles Resort
- Quabbin
- Rockfield
- Rockport
- Sand Bay Corner
- Seeley's Bay
- Selton
- Soperton
- Sweets Corners
- Taylor
- Tilley
- Union
- Warburton
- Washburns Corners
- Waterton
- Willowbank
- Wilstead

=== Lansdowne ===
Lansdowne, Ontario is a small community located just north of Ivy Lea, Ontario and 4 km north of Highway 401, at the intersection of Leeds and Grenville County Roads 3 and 34. It can be accessed by former Kings Highway 2 (which passes just south of the village) or by Highway 401 at Exit 659.

The administrative offices of the township are located here. There is an independent telephone exchange (+1-613-659-) and a post office (K0E 1L0). The Canadian customs point of entry at the terminus of US Interstate 81 on Hill Island identifies itself as Lansdowne 456.

=== Lyndhurst ===
The Lansdowne Iron Works, was founded by Wallis Sunderlin on the Gananoque River by 1801. The ironworks enabled the economic development of a small industrial community called Furnace Falls. The iron smelter was destroyed by fire in 1811. Several mills were established in Furnace Falls by Charles and Jonas Jones of Brockville in 1827. The settlement was renamed Lyndhurst by 1846. The Lansdowne Iron Works was designated a National Historic Site of Canada in 1932. A plaque commemorating the founding of Lyndhurst (Furnace Falls) in 1801 was erected by the Ontario Heritage Foundation. A plaque commemorating the Lyndhurst Bridge, built in 1856–1857, was erected by the Ontario Archaeological and Historic Sites Board. Designed by John Roddick, the masonry arch bridge was erected by contractors Miles Fulford and Simon Ransom.

Camp Hyanto, an Anglican church camp operated on the lake from the 1940s until 2022.

There is a cultural celebration in Lyndhurst dubbed the "Turkey Fair" celebrated annually on the third Saturday in September. This celebration involves hay-stack decoration, petting zoos, fishing contests for kids, crafts and 50/50 draws. The Lyndhurst Ice Fishing Derby, in late February, has been going for more than fifteen years.

=== Rockport ===
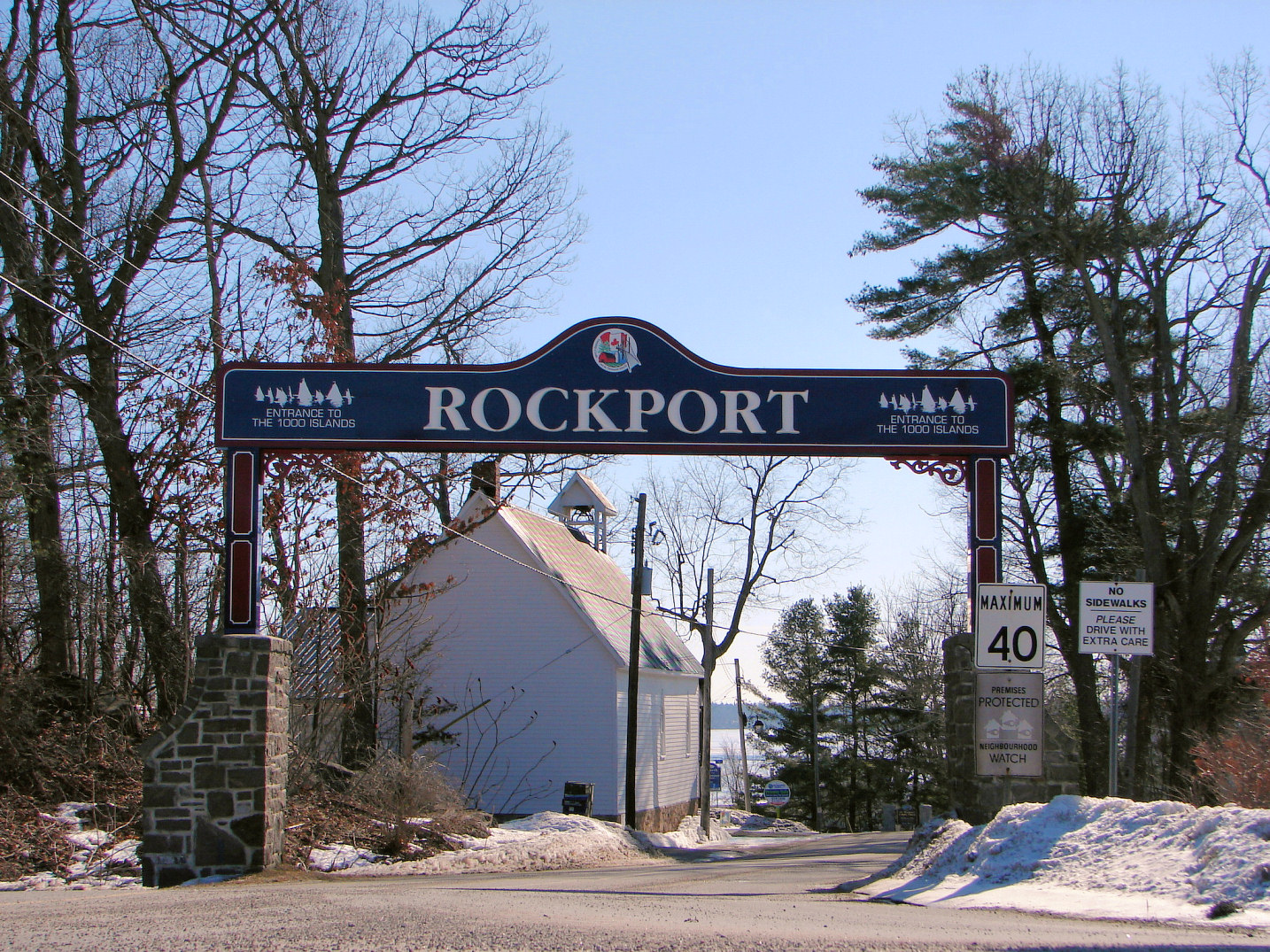
Rockport

Rockport is a village on the St. Lawrence River with historic homes, restaurants, resorts, boat launch and marinas. It has been a port since the late 1700s and is now a major terminus for Thousand Islands cruise tours. There are bicycle racks, benches, and well marked walking paths with interpretive signs and murals for points of historical interest. Two churches that were founded in the late 1800s remain active. Both reflect the architecture of their time.

For decades boats were built in Rockport; from small wooden St. Lawrence skiffs to large tour boats used on the St. Lawrence River, in Ottawa on the Rideau and Ottawa Rivers, and as far away as Banff National Park in Alberta. Before the building of the Thousand Islands Bridge nearby, ferryboats connected the US and Canada. The area remains famous for boat building, as the industry is producing ice boats that make winter travel to local island homes possible.

=== Seeley's Bay ===
Seeley's Bay is at the northwest corner of the Township of Leeds and the Thousand Islands and is most known for fishing and its direct access to the UNESCO designated Rideau Canal. The village was established early in the 19th century as a port of call for steamers going between Kingston and Ottawa on the Rideau Canal. Located just off Highway 15, about 20 minutes north of the 401 Highway, it still serves as the first full service port of call for boaters coming north on the Rideau. The annual Seeley's Bay Frost Fest, in early February, has been going for more than thirty years.

== Climate ==
Climate data for Leeds and the Thousand Islands
Month	Jan	Feb	Mar	Apr	May	Jun	Jul	Aug	Sep	Oct	Nov	Dec	Year
Record high °C (°F)	16.5 (61.7)	14.0 (57.2)	26.1 (79.0)	31.0 (87.8)	32.0 (89.6)	34.0 (93.2)	34.0 (93.2)	36.0 (96.8)	33.0 (91.4)	27.5 (81.5)	22.0 (71.6)	18.0 (64.4)	36.0 (96.8)
Mean daily maximum °C (°F)	−3.5 (25.7)	−1.7 (28.9)	3.8 (38.8)	11.7 (53.1)	18.8 (65.8)	23.5 (74.3)	26.3 (79.3)	25.1 (77.2)	20.5 (68.9)	13.4 (56.1)	6.8 (44.2)	0.1 (32.2)	12.1 (53.8)
Daily mean °C (°F)	−8.4 (16.9)	−7.2 (19.0)	−1.6 (29.1)	6.4 (43.5)	13.2 (55.8)	18.2 (64.8)	21.0 (69.8)	20.0 (68.0)	15.6 (60.1)	9.0 (48.2)	3.1 (37.6)	−3.7 (25.3)	7.1 (44.8)
Mean daily minimum °C (°F)	−13.3 (8.1)	−12.7 (9.1)	−6.9 (19.6)	1.0 (33.8)	7.6 (45.7)	12.8 (55.0)	15.7 (60.3)	14.9 (58.8)	10.7 (51.3)	4.5 (40.1)	−0.6 (30.9)	−7.7 (18.1)	2.2 (36.0)
Record low °C (°F)	−42.0 (−43.6)	−38.0 (−36.4)	−32.5 (−26.5)	−13.5 (7.7)	−2.5 (27.5)	1.0 (33.8)	6.5 (43.7)	5.0 (41.0)	−1.5 (29.3)	−6.5 (20.3)	−16.0 (3.2)	−36.5 (−33.7)	−42.0 (−43.6)
Average precipitation mm (inches)	70.1 (2.76)	67.0 (2.64)	61.8 (2.43)	79.0 (3.11)	81.4 (3.20)	83.2 (3.28)	78.3 (3.08)	89.1 (3.51)	105.5 (4.15)	87.9 (3.46)	94.5 (3.72)	76.2 (3.00)	971.7 (38.26)
Average rainfall mm (inches)	31.3 (1.23)	31.5 (1.24)	35.0 (1.38)	71.9 (2.83)	81.4 (3.20)	83.2 (3.28)	78.3 (3.08)	89.1 (3.51)	102.5 (4.04)	86.5 (3.41)	82.8 (3.26)	42.4 (1.67)	815.4 (32.10)
Average snowfall cm (inches)	39.7 (15.6)	35.6 (14.0)	26.8 (10.6)	7.1 (2.8)	0.0 (0.0)	0.0 (0.0)	0.0 (0.0)	0.0 (0.0)	0.0 (0.0)	1.4 (0.6)	12.0 (4.7)	33.8 (13.3)	156.3 (61.5)
Average precipitation days (≥ 0.2 mm)	14.3	11.6	11.8	12.2	13.2	12.4	10.6	11.0	11.8	12.9	14.1	14.2	150.1
Average rainy days (≥ 0.2 mm)	4.9	4.1	6.7	11.0	13.2	12.4	10.6	11.0	11.8	12.9	11.5	6.5	116.6
Average snowy days (≥ 0.2 cm)	11.2	8.7	6.6	2.4	0.04	0.0	0.0	0.0	0.0	0.27	3.6	9.0	41.8
Source: Environment Canada

== Demographics ==
In the 2021 Census of Population conducted by Statistics Canada, Leeds and the Thousand Islands had a population of 9,804 living in 3,994 of its 5,040 total private dwellings, a change of 3.6% from its 2016 population of 9,465. With a land area of 608.09 km^{2} (234.78 sq mi), it had a population density of 16.1/km^{2} (41.8/sq mi) in 2021.

Canada census – Leeds and the Thousand Islands community profile

	2021	2016	2011
Population	9,804 (+3.6% from 2016)	9465 (2.0% from 2011)	9277 (-1.7% from 2006)
Land area	608.09 km^{2} (234.78 sq mi)	612.45 km^{2} (236.47 sq mi)	612.51 km^{2} (236.49 sq mi)
Population density	16.1/km^{2} (42/sq mi)	15.5/km^{2} (40/sq mi)	15.1/km^{2} (39/sq mi)
Median age	52.0 (M: 51.6, F: 52.4)	50.5 (M: 50.2, F: 50.7)
Private dwellings	5,040 (total) 3,994 (occupied)	4903 (total)	4731 (total)
Median household income	$91,000	$76,300

References: 2021 2016 2011

Historical census populations – Leeds and the Thousand Islands
Year	Pop.	±%
2001	9,069	—
2006	9,435	+4.0%
2011	9,277	−1.7%
2016	9,465	+2.0%
2021	9,804	+3.6%
Source: Statistics Canada

- Population in 1996:
  - Front of Escott: 1,383
  - Front of Leeds and Lansdowne: 4,897
  - Rear of Leeds and Lansdowne: 2,895
- Population in 1991:
  - Front of Escott: 1,275
  - Front of Leeds and Lansdowne: 4,686
  - Rear of Leeds and Lansdowne: 2,774

Mother tongue (2021):

- English as first language: 93.8%
- French as first language: 2.4%
- English and French as first language: 0.5%
- Other as first language: 2.9%

== See also ==
- List of townships in Ontario
