= Deer Island (Thousand Islands) =

River island in New York State

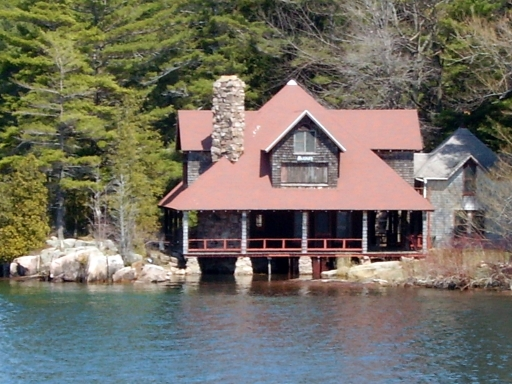
- Deer Island as photographed from aboard a Rockport Boat Line touring vessel.

- Location within New York

Geography
- Location: Saint Lawrence River at Alexandria, Jefferson County, New York
- Coordinates: 44°21′44″N 75°54′25″W
- Archipelago: Thousand Islands
- Total islands: 1,864
- Major islands: Dark Island, Longue Vue Island, Wellesley Island, Zavikon Island
- Area: 0.078124686605 sq mi (0.20234200943 km^{2})
- Highest elevation: 265 ft (80.8 m)
- Highest point: "Foot of the Island"

Administration
- United States

Deer Island is one of the American Thousand Islands. It lies between mainland Canada and United States, within the Saint Lawrence River, in the Town of Alexandria, close to Alexandria Bay, New York. It is owned entirely by the Russell Trust Association and is used as a Skull and Bones retreat.

The island lies near Boldt Castle and can be seen up close from several Canadian and U.S. tour vessels that operate in the local waterways. The land on the island is densely overgrown, with a small lodge on the southern corner of the island.

Skull and Bones doesn't own an opulent island hideaway like the one depicted in The Skulls. It does own an island on the St. Lawrence River — Deer Island, in Alexandria Bay. The forty-acre retreat is intended to give Bonesmen an opportunity to "get together and rekindle old friendships". A century ago the island sported tennis courts and its softball fields were surrounded by rhubarb plants and gooseberry bushes. Catboats waited on the lake. Stewards catered elegant meals. But although each new Skull and Bones member still visits Deer Island, the place leaves something to be desired. "Now it is just a bunch of burned-out stone buildings," a patriarch sighs. "It's basically ruins." Another Bonesman says that to call the island "rustic" would be to glorify it. "It's a dump, but it's beautiful." The fading of Deer Island exemplifies the dwindling finances of Skull and Bones, which can no longer claim the largest society endowment at Yale. Unlike members of other societies, Bonesmen pay no dues, though patriarchs receive an annual letter requesting a "voluntary contribution to the Russell Trust Association." In truth, Skull and Bones has never been wealthy.

— Alexandra Robbins, The Atlantic

== Flora and fauna ==
The island is covered in indigenous trees, made up of mostly white pine, black oak, hemlock, and sugar maple — typical of the Canadian Shield — as is much of the surrounding area. There are several abandoned ruins located throughout the 50-acre (20 ha) island, now overgrown and barely visible beneath the growth.
