= Just Room Enough Island =

Island in New York, United States

Just Room Enough
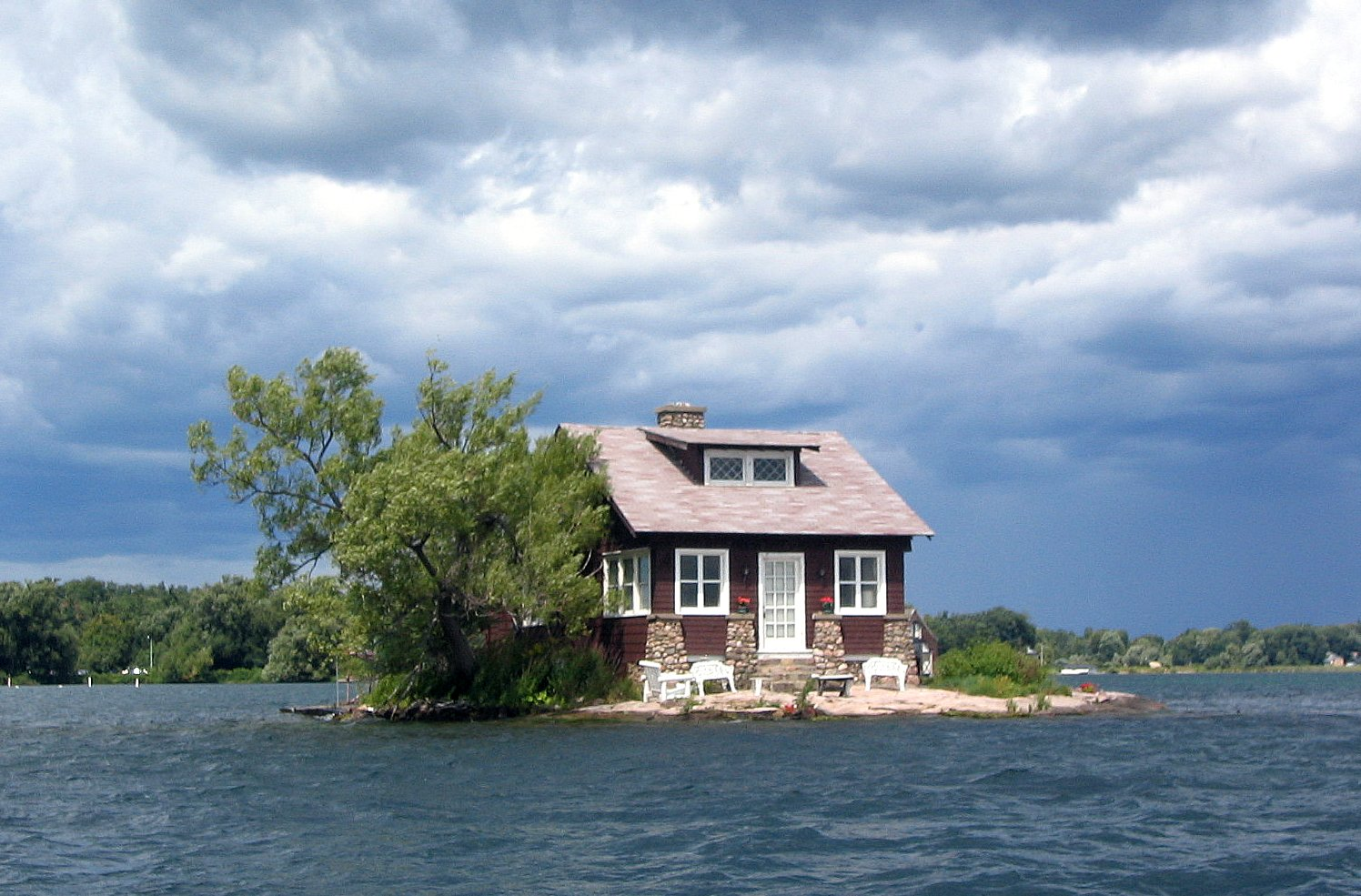

- Location within New York

Geography
- Location: Thousand Islands
- Coordinates: 44°20′33.5″N 75°55′29.5″W
- Archipelago: Thousand Islands

Administration
- United States
- State: New York
- County: Jefferson
- Town: Alexandria
- Village: Alexandria Bay

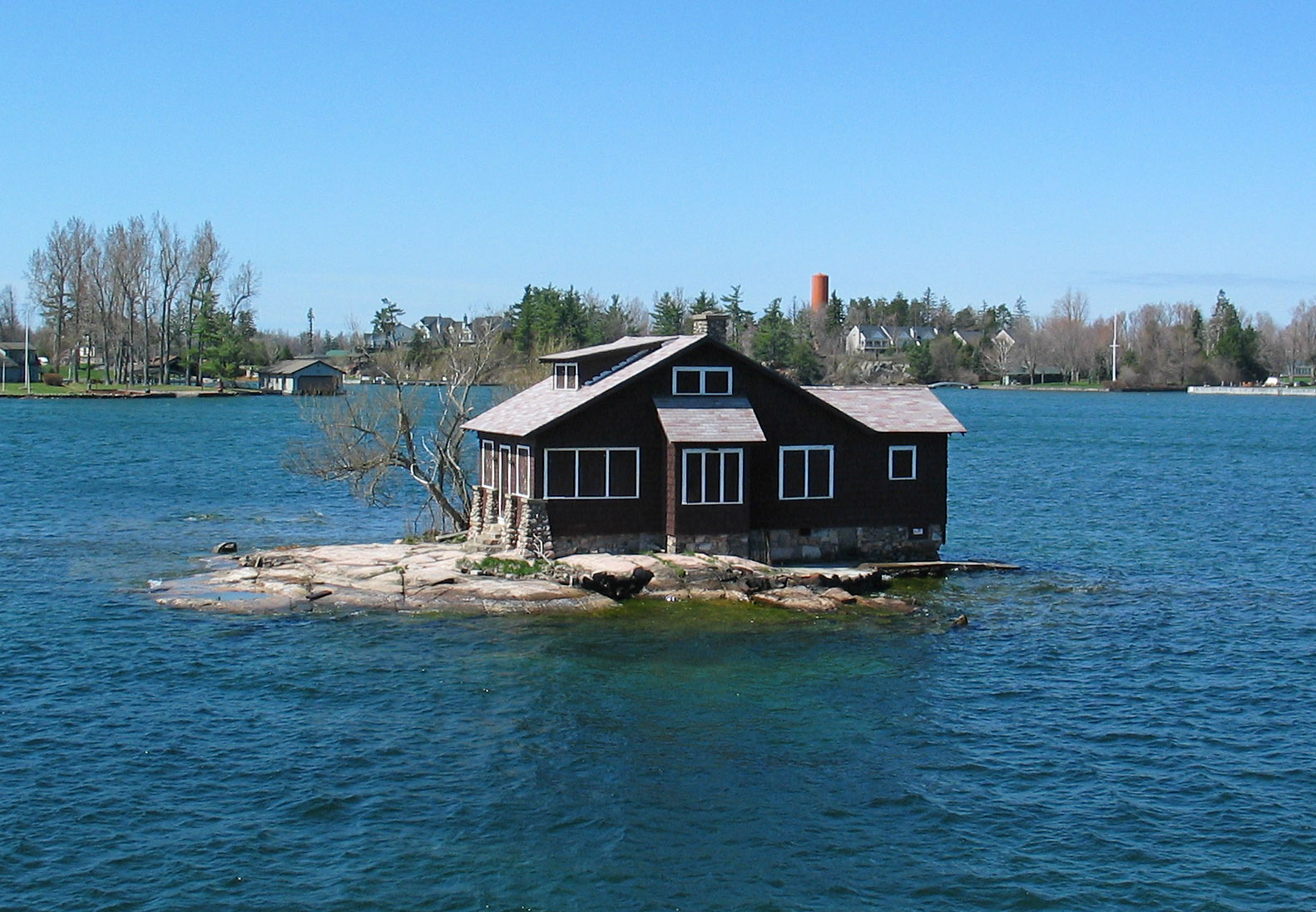
Northeast side of the island

Just Room Enough Island, also known as Just Enough Room Island or Hub Island, is an island located in the Thousand Islands chain, in New York, United States. The island is known for being the smallest inhabited island in the world, which appears to be around 3,300 square feet (310 m^{2}), or about one-thirteenth of an acre. Purchased by the Sizeland family in the 1950s, the island has a house, a tree, shrubs, and a small beach.

== History ==
The island was bought in the 1950s by the Sizeland family, who wanted a holiday getaway and built a house there. Because of the island's small size, in 2010, The Washington Post stated, "One misstep and you're swimming".

Bishop Rock was formerly the smallest inhabited island but lost its title in 1992 when the lighthouse became automated and hence had no need for human presence.

== Geography ==
Just Room Enough Island lies on the Saint Lawrence River between Heart Island and Imperial Isle, close to the US border with Canada. The island is part of Alexandria Bay, a village within the town of Alexandria, Jefferson County, New York. From Boldt Castle, this little red house is very easy to spot.

== See also ==
- List of notable Thousand Islands
