= Grenadier Island =

Grenadier Island may refer to:

- Grenadier Island, New York
- Grenadier Island (Saint Lawrence River) in Ontario
