= Thwartway Island =

Native name: Leek Island
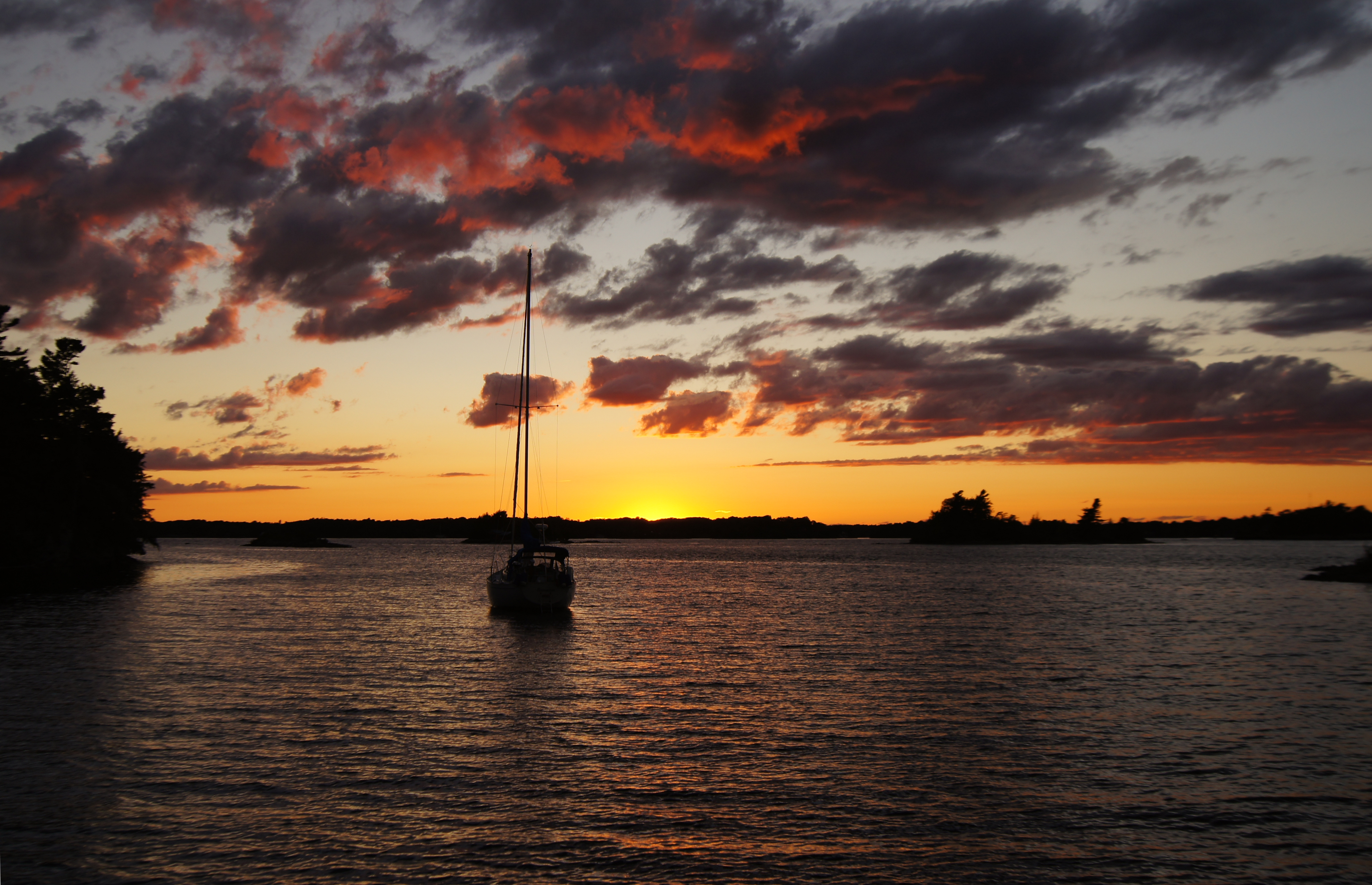
- Interactive map of Thwartway Island

Geography
- Location: Saint Lawrence River
- Coordinates: 44°17′46″N 76°09′15″W
- Archipelago: Thousand Islands (Admiralty Group)
- Area: 0.4 km^{2} (0.15 sq mi)
- Highest elevation: 90 m (300 ft)

Administration
- Canada
- Province: Ontario
- United counties: Leeds and Grenville
- Management: Parks Canada

Demographics
- Population: 0

Thwartway Island (historically and locally known as Leek Island) is a heavily wooded island situated within the Saint Lawrence River in Leeds and the Grenville United Counties, Ontario, Canada. The island belongs to the Admiralty Group of the Thousand Islands archipelago. Fully managed and preserved by Parks Canada, it is a key constituent of Thousand Islands National Park.

== History ==
Prior to European exploration, the surrounding archipelago served as traditional camping and hunting grounds for the Iroquoian peoples. As a young man, the American author Upton Sinclair spent many summers camping on the island as he was writing his first novels. In 1904, Ira and Katherine Kip purchased the island, developing a private estate that was later offered to the Canadian government in 1917 as a convalescent hospital for World War I soldiers. The site provided rehabilitation through outdoor activities and, according to a 1918 scrapbook, served soldiers recovering from physical wounds and shell shock. The property was later incorporated into the national park system in 1972 and is now known as Thwartway Island. More information is available from the National Library of Medicine.

== Geography ==
Thwartway Island is characterized by an unrefined, heavily forested interior typical of the Frontenac Axis—a southern extension of Precambrian granite connecting the Canadian Shield to the Adirondack Mountains. The western shoreline features Leek Beach, one of the few natural sandy beaches in the Admiralty Group archipelago, which acts as a major regional visual landmark and recreational hub.
