= The Skulls (film) =

- Theatrical release poster
- Directed by: Rob Cohen
- Written by: John Pogue
- Produced by: Neal H. Moritz; John Pogue
- Starring: Joshua Jackson; Paul Walker; Hill Harper; Leslie Bibb; Christopher McDonald; Steve Harris; William Petersen; Craig T. Nelson
- Cinematography: Shane Hurlbut
- Edited by: Peter Amundson
- Music by: Randy Edelman
- Production company: Original Film
- Distributed by: Universal Pictures (United States and United Kingdom); Summit Entertainment (international)
- Release date: March 31, 2000 (United States)
- Running time: 106 minutes
- Country: United States
- Language: English
- Budget: $15 million
- Box office: $50.8 million

The Skulls is a 2000 American thriller film directed by Rob Cohen and starring Joshua Jackson, Paul Walker and Leslie Bibb. Its plot is based upon some of the conspiracy theories surrounding Yale University's Skull and Bones student society. The Skulls was released by Universal Pictures on March 31, 2000 in the United States, with Summit Entertainment releasing in other territories. The film was critically panned, but successful enough to spawn two direct-to-video sequels, The Skulls II and The Skulls III, released in 2002 and 2004, respectively.

== Plot ==
Luke McNamara is a student aspiring to become a lawyer. An orphaned "townie" who grew up on the "wrong side of the tracks", he did well enough in school to attend college on a scholarship where he is a champion rower. His best friends at college are his love interest Chloe and Will. Will is the coxswain of the Bulldog 8's rowing team, and Luke is the captain. Luke's friendships become strained when he is invited to join a secret society known as "The Skulls". Luke passes the first part of the initiation process by stealing an artifact from a rival secret society. He does this with boxing prodigy Caleb Mandrake, who The Skulls declare his co-conspirator and "soulmate". Luke and Caleb are lectured in the secret ritual room by a senior Skull who is standing in front of a wall with the word "WAR" engraved into it in huge capital letters. A senior Skull explains that the Skulls require their members to prove themselves in war. Luke has a falling out with Will over Luke becoming a Skull.

Luke strikes up a friendship with Caleb's father, Litten Mandrake. Litten is the current Chairman of the Skulls and a Federal Court Judge who is pushing for a position in the Supreme Court. Litten and his partner, Senator Ames Levritt, take an interest in Luke. Will, who has researched the Skulls for some time, discovers their ritual room after stealing Caleb's book and key. Will gets caught in the room by Caleb and soon after, Will is found to have seemingly hanged himself in his dorm room. Stricken with grief over Will's death, Luke finds Caleb's book in Will's belongings and begins to suspect he was murdered by Caleb. Caleb also believes that he is guilty, suspecting Will died as a direct consequence of Caleb dropping him.

Luke enlists his friends from childhood to help solve the mystery. With their help, Luke obtains the Skulls security tapes, which show that during Will and Caleb's struggle, Will was knocked unconscious but not killed. Caleb was ordered to leave the room by his father, who then ordered Skull member and the University's provost Martin Lombard to break Will's neck, then making it appear he had hanged himself. In trying to convince Caleb of the truth, Luke realizes how scared Caleb is of his father. Before Luke can show the evidence to police, the Skulls council, who know Luke has the tapes, vote that he is no longer loyal. Ames Levritt is blackmailed into voting against Luke by Litten Mandrake, who has pictures of him with his much younger mistress. When Luke goes to the police, the tape is switched by Detective Sparrow, and Luke is confined to a mental hospital.

With the help of Ames and Chloe, Luke escapes the hospital, and he and Chloe survive an attempt on his life by Martin Lombard, who is shot and killed by Detective Sparrow, who is working for Levritt. Luke decides that his only option is to fight the Skulls by their own rules and "bring war to them". He challenges Caleb to a duel at the Skulls' private island, by invoking rule 119. Litten tries to take his son's place in the duel but is denied the opportunity due to another Skull rule. After Luke and Caleb take their ten paces and turn around, Luke drops his gun and tries convincing Caleb of the truth and that he is not responsible for Will's murder. Despite being pressured by Litten to kill Luke, Caleb cannot bring himself to pull the trigger. Litten grabs a pistol and attempts to shoot Luke, but before he can fire, Caleb shoots his father. Mortified at what he has done, Caleb tries to kill himself but is stopped by Luke.

Luke realizes that Senator Levritt manipulated Luke and others to bring about Litten's downfall. Luke becomes disgusted with The Skulls and refuses to participate further, despite Levritt telling him that he will be tracked down and that The Skulls will accept him because he has proven himself in war. As Luke walks away, Levritt says to himself, "Well done son, well done".

== Cast ==
- Joshua Jackson as Lucas John "Luke" McNamara, the new Skulls member.
- Paul Walker as Caleb Mandrake, one of the new Skulls members along with Luke.
- Hill Harper as Will Beckford, Luke's classmate and best friend.
- Leslie Bibb as Chloe Whitfield, Luke's classmate and love interest.
- Christopher McDonald as Martin Lombard, a provost at Yale University.
- Steve Harris as Detective Sparrow, a police detective who investigates the Skulls.
- William Petersen as Senator Ames Levritt, member of 1972 Skulls class, and one of the leaders of the organization.
- Craig T. Nelson as Judge Litten Mandrake, Caleb's father, member of 1972 Skulls class.
- Derek Aasland as Sullivan, one of Luke's townie friends who come to the rescue.
- David Asman as Jason Pitcairn
- Scott Gibson as Travis Wheeler
- Nigel Bennett as Dr. Rupert Whitney, the member of 1973 Skulls class. He is now head of protocol.
- Noah Danby as Hugh Mauberson
- Steven McCarthy as Sweeney

== Setting ==
The film was shot in Toronto with the University of Toronto disguised as Yale University, the plot's setting. Scenes were also filmed in the city's suburban neighbourhood of Guildwood.

Many of University of Toronto's most notable buildings are featured in the film. A part of University College stands in for the Skulls' headquarters, while the office of the Skulls' leader shown as being in Trinity College. The rival society is headquartered in the student council building. The protagonists live and eat in Burwash Hall. The opening rowing scene was shot in St. Catharines, Ontario. Several scenes were shot on Dark Island in the Saint Lawrence Seaway.

== Production ==
In March 1999, Universal acquired the U.S. and U.K. rights as part of an expansion into teen driven genre fare. Summit Entertainment handled international sales on the film. Newmarket Films financed the Original films produced film as part of a joint venture.

== Reception ==
=== Box office ===
The film opened at #3 at the North American box office, making US$11,034,885 in its opening weekend, behind The Road to El Dorado and Erin Brockovich.

=== Critical response ===
On Rotten Tomatoes, the film has a 9% rating based on 85 reviews. The site's critics consensus states: "The Skulls is full of nonsense and empty of a good script and plot." On Metacritic, it has a score of 24% based on reviews from 24 critics, indicating "generally unfavorable reviews." Audiences surveyed by CinemaScore gave the film a grade B on scale of A to F.

Roger Ebert of the Chicago Sun-Times called it "so ludicrous in so many different ways it achieves a kind of forlorn grandeur."

Director Rob Cohen is very fond of the film and the cast: "It was a very intense set because I had in my mind that I was telling the story of George Senior and George W. Bush. I had gone to Harvard that had the dining clubs but not the Skull and Bones, the secret societies. But I knew a lot about the secret societies, and I thought this is how the elite functions. This is how the elite knits together these bonds that take them through life and keep them in the elite heights of any society, and I was very excited about portraying that with Paul and Josh and all the cast. To create this secret world of power elites… that was very exciting to me and I got the cast excited about that idea. It's interesting how many of the critics missed this and didn't understand it and blowed it off as silly. Skull and Bones is a reality and the film got very close to how that reality works at Yale."
