= Sugar Island (St. Lawrence River) =

Island in the St. Lawrence River, Ontario, Canada

Coordinates: 44°19′05″N 76°05′46″W

Sugar Island is located in the Thousand Islands region of the St. Lawrence River in the United Counties of Leeds and Grenville, Ontario. It is roughly 35 acres (140,000 m^{2}) of undeveloped island wilderness. In the 1950s the local nautical charts changed the name from St. Lawrence Island to the name the island has now, Sugar Island.

In the late 19th century the island was inhabited the year round by a farming family, and the maple trees were tapped for syrup, which gave Sugar Island its current name. In 1900, the American Canoe Association formed a committee to obtain a permanent site on the St. Lawrence River to hold its annual meet.

On July 18, 1901, Sugar Island, then known as St. Lawrence island, was purchased for $1,000 on land set aside for use of the Mississaguas of Alnwick Indians. Starting in 1903 they hosted the annual meet for camping, competition and camaraderie between canoeists. Canoeists, kayakers and sailors come to visit from around the world and participate in longstanding competitions. The national encampment has been held every year since 1903 with the exception of Turtle Island in Lake George in 1926, no meets in 1944 and 1945, and one National Encampment in the Midwest in the 1970s. Members and their guests traveled for many years by train to Clayton, New York, or Gananoque, Canada, and paddled or traveled by ferry to the island. The ferry "Yenneck" serviced the island for twenty-five years.

For many years the only buildings on the island were the mess hall, the storehouse, and the ice house, the latter a favorite gathering place of the younger generation. After World War II a limited number of cabin sites were made available to members. There is still no electricity or phone service on the island.
