= Dark Island =

Island in the Saint Lawrence Seaway

Coordinates: 44°27′07″N 75°48′44″W

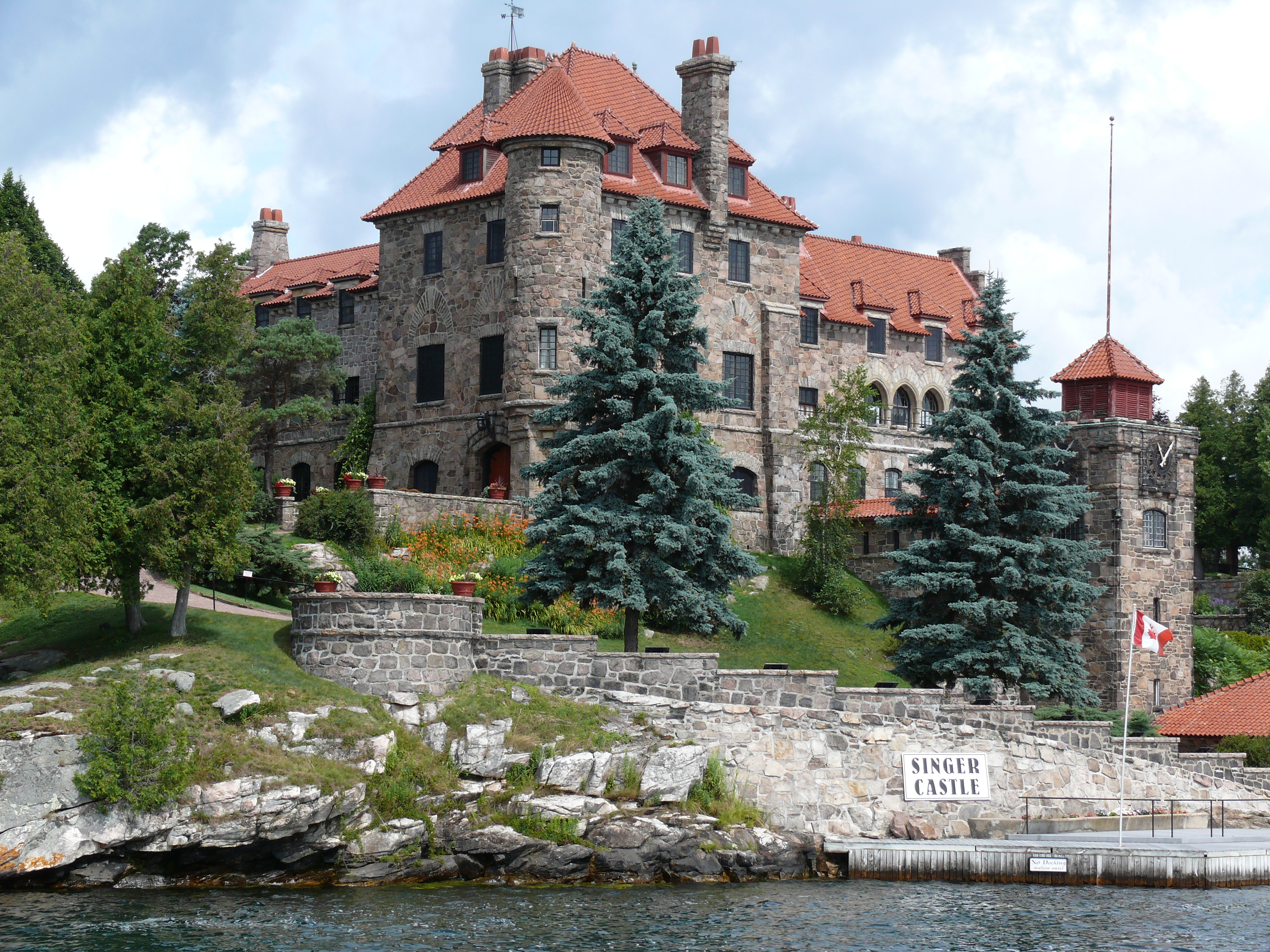
Singer Castle in 2009

Dark Island, a prominent feature of the Saint Lawrence Seaway, is located in the lower (eastern) Thousand Islands region, near Chippewa Bay. It is a part of the Town of Hammond, in St. Lawrence County, New York.

A historic landmark on the island, "The Towers", was long known as "Dark Island Castle" until recently renamed "Singer Castle". The island is situated only a few yards south of the Canada-United States border that runs along the river.

The castle features 28 rooms, including bedrooms, bathrooms, a large Drawing Room, library, and kitchen. Within the walls is a network of secret passageways that are accessible from various locations, one of which is a panel in the library that, at one time, could be opened by pulling a specific book from a nearby shelf, triggering the locking mechanism.

The south side of the island is only about one hundred feet from the shipping channel, and cargo ships frequently pass the island. Because of the depth of the channel on one side, and the relative shallowness on the other, it is very good for sport fishing of largemouth bass and northern pike.

== Early history of the castle ==
Most of the architectural work at Dark Island is attributed to the prominent American architect Ernest Flagg. His client was Frederick Gilbert Bourne, president of the Singer Manufacturing Company (now the Singer Corporation), producer of the Singer Sewing Machine. His daughter, Marjorie Bourne Thayer, made large additions in 1928. Flagg also designed the skyscraper headquarters for the company in New York City, the tallest building in the world at the time. Flagg is known for many major American projects, such as the United States Naval Academy at Annapolis, Maryland.

The island's castle was the last of several "castles" built at the Thousand Islands during a brief interval (1888–1905). Bourne undertook the project while the larger Boldt Castle was nearing completion nearby. The architect modeled the stone structure, planned in 1903, on a castle in Woodstock, England that was described in Sir Walter Scott's book Woodstock.

Following the 1919 death of Frederick Bourne, his daughter Marjorie (Mrs. Alexander D. Thayer) took title to the property. Her ownership was contested by a brother, but she retained title.

Upon her death, the Roman Catholic order Brothers of the Christian Schools (the Christian Brothers) acquired Dark Island along with the large Bourne country house, Indian Neck Hall at Oakdale on Long Island, which thereafter became LaSalle Military Academy. Having little use for the remote island in the St. Lawrence River, the Christian Brothers sold Dark Island in 1965 for approximately US$5,000, to be used thereafter by a charitable organization of religious character, the Harold Martin Evangelistic Association.

== Subsequent history ==
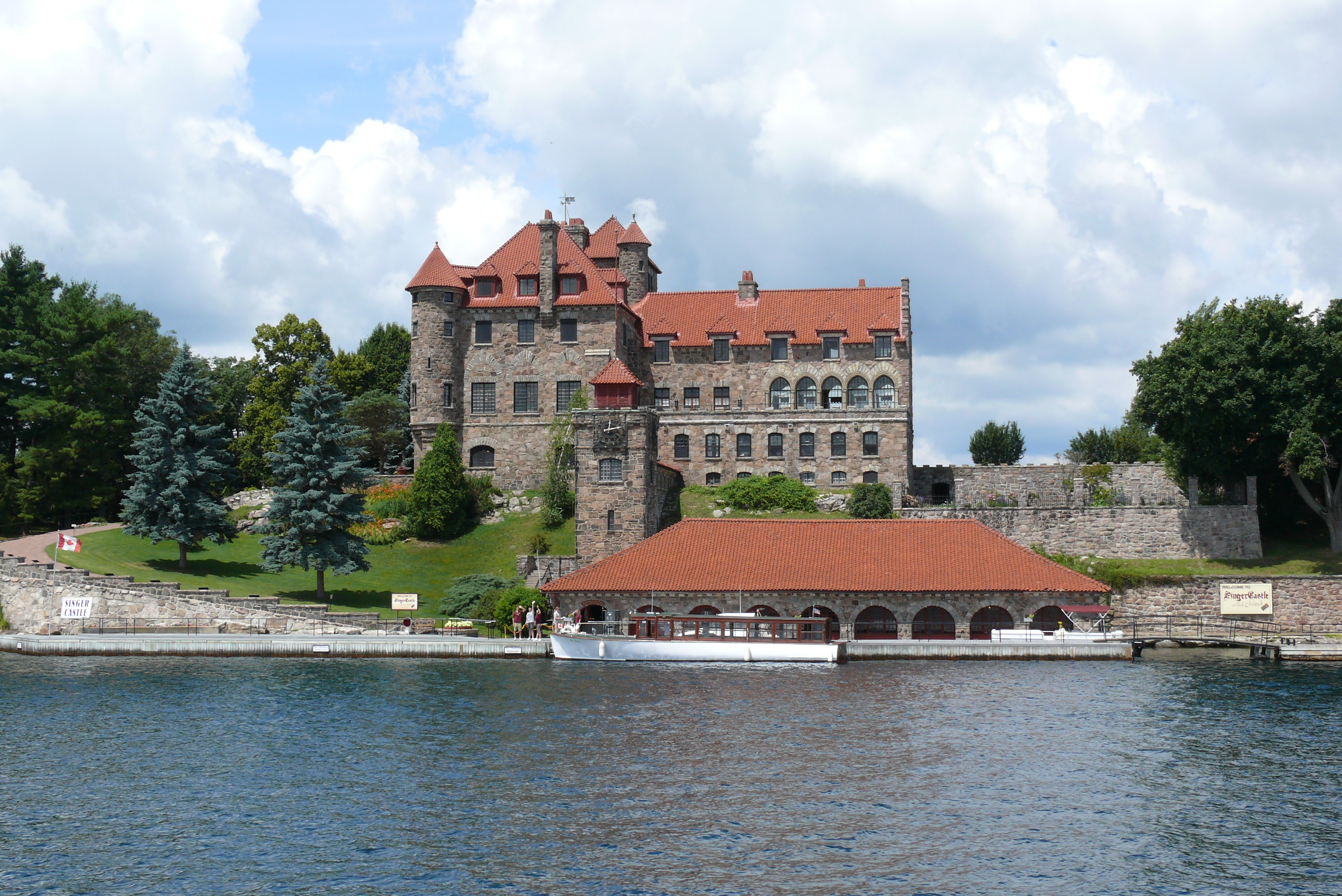
View of the castle and its boathouse

The previous tax-exempt status of the property was contested by neighbors after occupancy by the new owner. They contended that Dr. Harold Martin, director of the charity, maintained the tax-exempt property for his own private use as a summer residence. Martin prevailed in court, on the basis that he and his wife, Eloise, offered a religious service on the island every Sunday morning, open to all. During this Martin interval, the property was called "Jorstadt Castle," from Dr. Harold Martin's family surname before immigrating from Norway. The castle's name has since been changed to "Singer Castle."

After more than thirty years of Martin tenure, removal, sometimes due to theft, depleted the original contents. Due to the high cost of maintenance, a number of original fixtures and artifacts fell into disrepair. Rumors about the true use of the property (its new name not identifying any religious or charitable ownership), together with gradual deterioration of the property and stories about a complex maze of dimly lit secret passageways, complete with a dungeon, all increased the romantic mystique of Dark Island.

During the later decades of the Martin period (the late 1980s and early 1990s), Dark Island was listed for sale. Advertisements appeared in high-end real estate magazines such as Unique Homes with suggestions that it be a "private residence, corporate retreat or hunting lodge." Interest came from as far as Japan, but the property remained unsold until acquired in 2001 by Dark Island Tours, Inc., a venture of German businessman Farhad Vladi and two European business partners. Vladi also operates Vladi Private Islands GmbH, real estate company based in Hamburg, Germany that specializes in selling islands.

Dark Island Tours, Inc. undertook an extensive campaign of restoration and adaptation in order to open Dark Island to the visiting public. Tours were initiated in 2003. Despite losses over the years, the interior of the castle retains its original character, with most of the Bourne-Thayer furnishings. Unlike nearby Boldt Castle, Dark Island always served as a private residence, until opened to the public for tours.

In 2006, Dark Island was listed for sale through Sotheby's International Realty for $22 million.

== Popular culture ==
The castle was featured in the 2000 film, The Skulls

An episode of The Great Escape was filmed at Singer Castle but it never aired.

The Canadian folk rock band Great Lake Swimmers recorded part of their 2009 album Lost Channels at the castle. The album includes an interlude consisting of 48 seconds of the castle bells chiming.
