= Heart Island =

Island in New York, United States

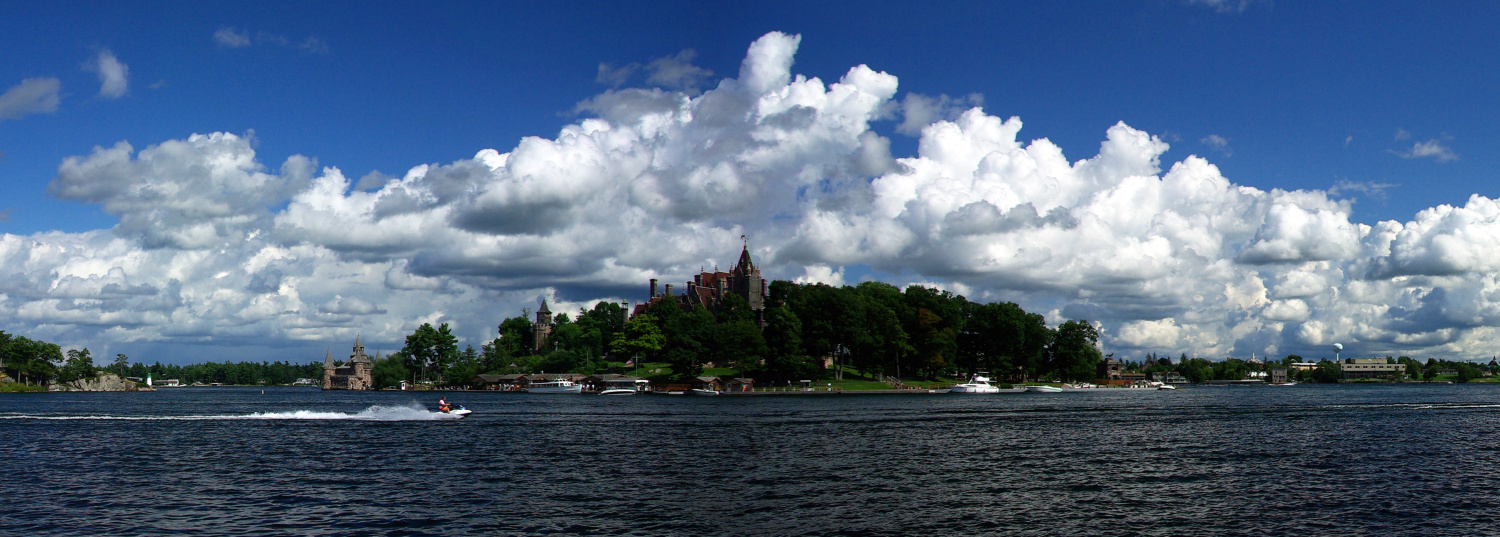
Panoramic view of Heart Island and Boldt Castle in the Thousand Islands of Upstate New York

Heart Island is located in the Town of Alexandria, Jefferson County, New York, within the Saint Lawrence River, along the Canada–United States border. It is one of the most prominent islands in the Thousand Islands archipelago shared by the two countries.

Heart Island is home to Boldt Castle, a popular tourist attraction that is open to the public.
