= Grenadier Island (Saint Lawrence River) =

Coordinates: 44°24′28″N 75°52′21″W

Grenadier Island is one of the islands of the Thousand Islands located on the St. Lawrence River in the United Counties of Leeds and Grenville, Ontario, Canada.

== Naming ==
The island is named after the British Grenadier Guards regiment.

== History ==
=== Early history ===
In 1654, Pere Simon le Moyne, a Jesuit Priest, made the first recorded voyage of a European through the upper St. Lawrence. He was sent from Montreal to establish a mission at Oswego. On his way, he stopped at the village of Toniata where he observed native Mississauga Indians fishing for eel. According to an old hand drawn map on file in Ottawa, the site of Toniata Village is believed to have been near the river, on what is now the Canadian mainland, just northwest of the foot of Grenadier Island near Mallorytown Landing.

During the Seven Years' War, Captain Francois Pouchot of the French Navy also visited Grenadier Island. In his memoirs, he wrote

At five leagues from Point au Baril is the Island of Toniata. The main channel of the river is between this island and the south shore. The north part of the river is filled with rushes, and in summer, it is famous for a thriving eel fishery.

M. de Frontenac gave this island to an Iroquois, and the latter sold it for four pots of Brandy to a Canadien, who would have in turn sold it back for a beaver skin.

Pouchot claimed the meaning of Toniata is "Beyond the Point".

=== 19th century ===
The island remained under native control until the United Empire Loyalists arrived in the early 19th century. During the War of 1812, Grenadier Island hosted a watch post. By 1818, twelve farms had been established. The island was preferable to the mainland for farming because it was less rugged and had good soil. During the 19th century, steamboat traffic increased dramatically.

Since the early 1870s Grenadier Island has become a popular summer retreat.

=== 20th century ===
The west end of Grenadier Island became part of St. Lawrence Islands National Park in 1905, one year after the park was established. Since that time other parts of the island were purchased or donated.

Brooker's Creek on Grenadier Island: In May 1999, 70.2 acres (284,000 m^{2}) of ecologically sensitive wetland along Brooker's Creek on the north side of Grenadier Island became part of the park. The property is physically connected with other wetland property in the Park. It is protected as a wetland of high importance for conservation and high resource sensitivity. Two bird species found here, the least bittern and red-shouldered hawk, are rated as species of special concern by the Committee on the Status of Endangered Wildlife in Canada. The swamp woods and marshes found here are home to numerous species of breeding birds and are alive with bird song in migration seasons. Reptiles such as the stinkpot turtle and Blanding's turtle and several amphibian species including a variety of frogs and salamanders thrive in this highly productive habitat. The property is not easily accessible by the public and is protected as highly sensitive lands.

== Golf club ==
The Grenadier Island Country Club, founded in 1927, and private since July 2005, is one of the oldest island golf courses in Canada.

== Lighthouse ==
A lighthouse was established on the southwest end of Grenadier Island in 1856, when lighting of the Canadian Thousand Islands was initiated. The first lightkeeper was Joseph Austin, who was appointed that year. In 1863, he was replaced by Albert Root, who then acted as keeper for 45 years. Albert was replaced by his son Delbert in 1908, and he stood as lightkeeper until 1923, when the lighthouse was automated. The Root Family took care of the lighthouse for 60 years. The old light tower was removed in 1923, though a modern light remains in the spot 100 years later.
