= Thousand Islands =

Archipelago in the Saint Lawrence River

Thousand Islands French: Mille-Îles
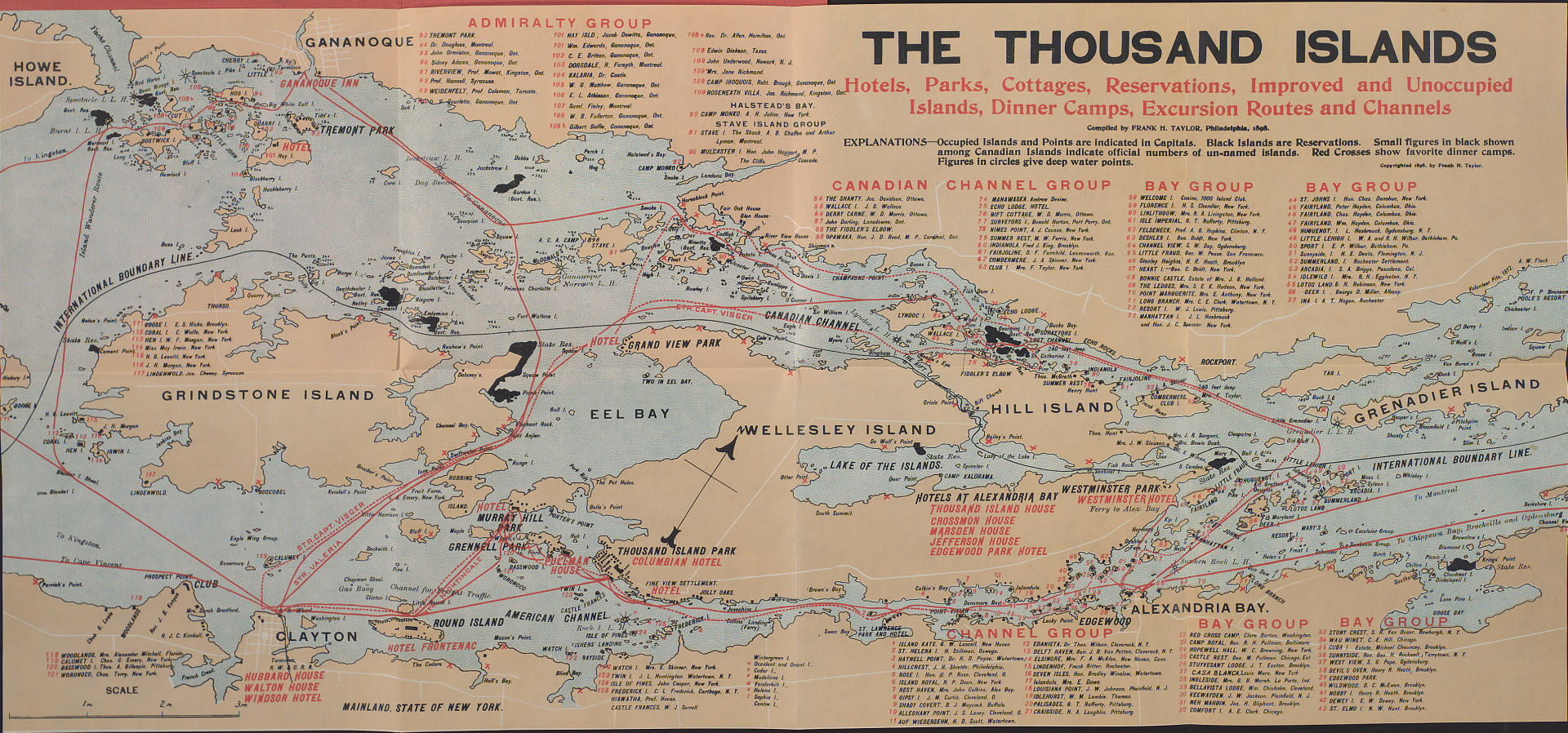
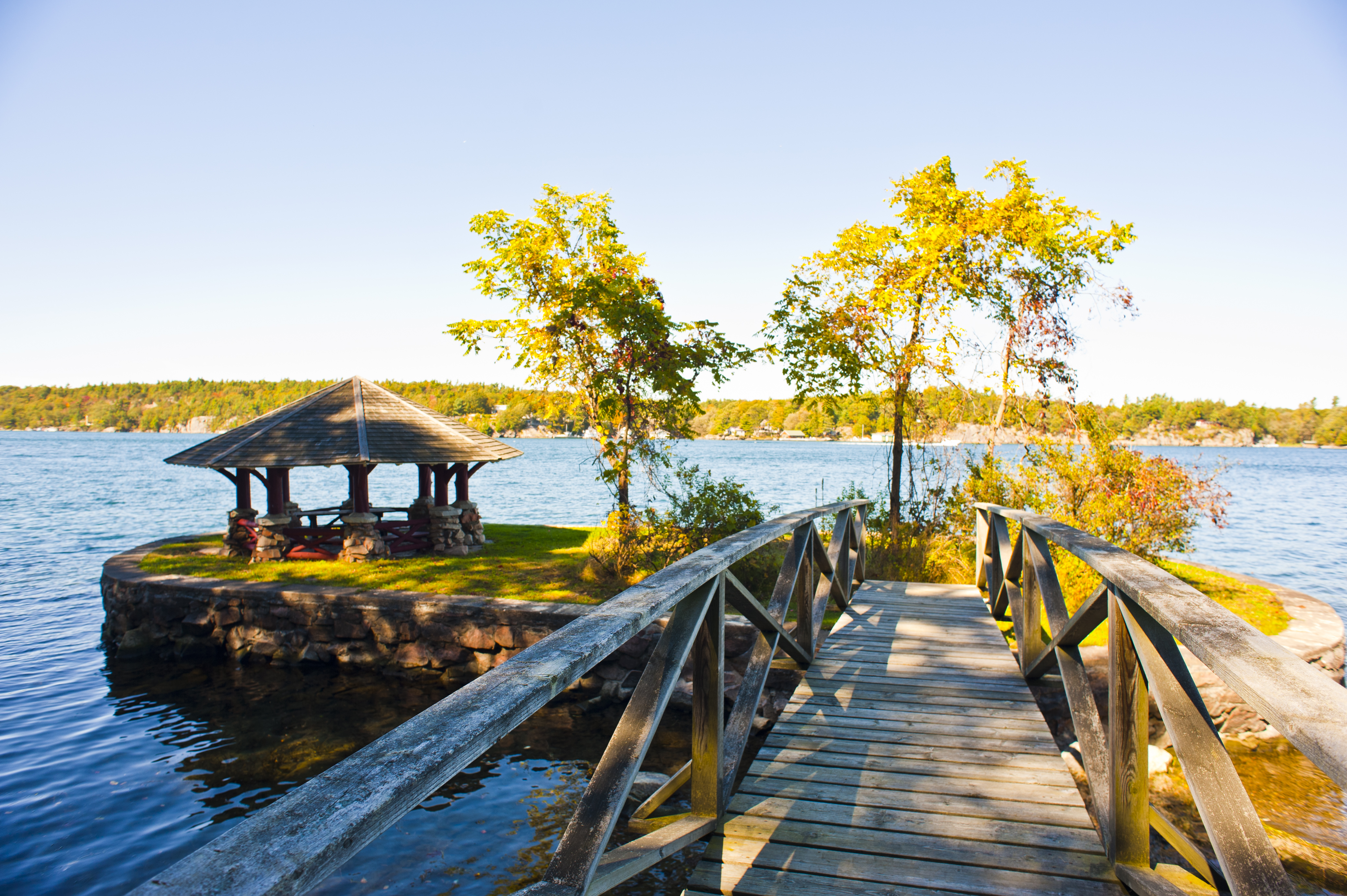
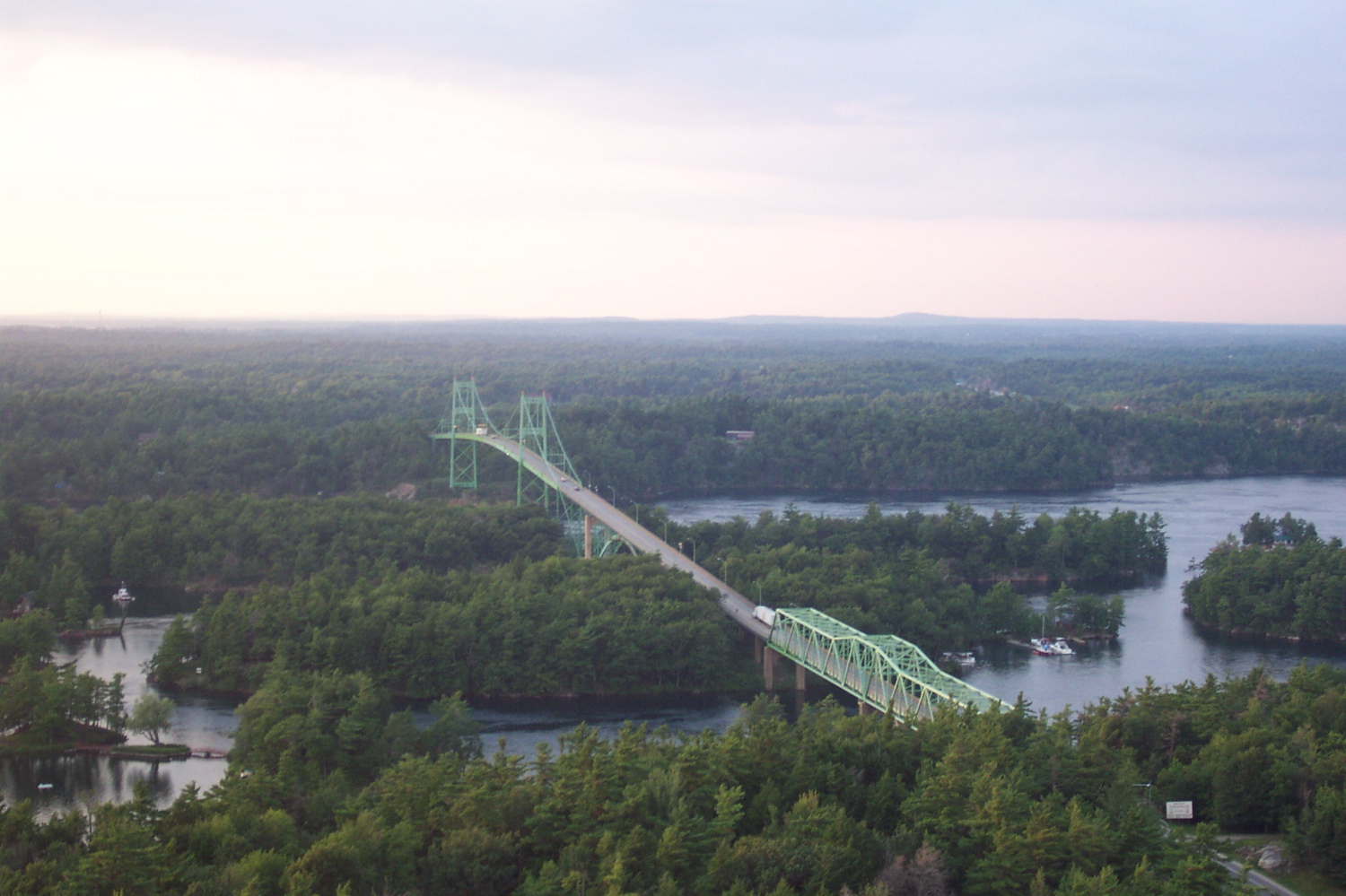
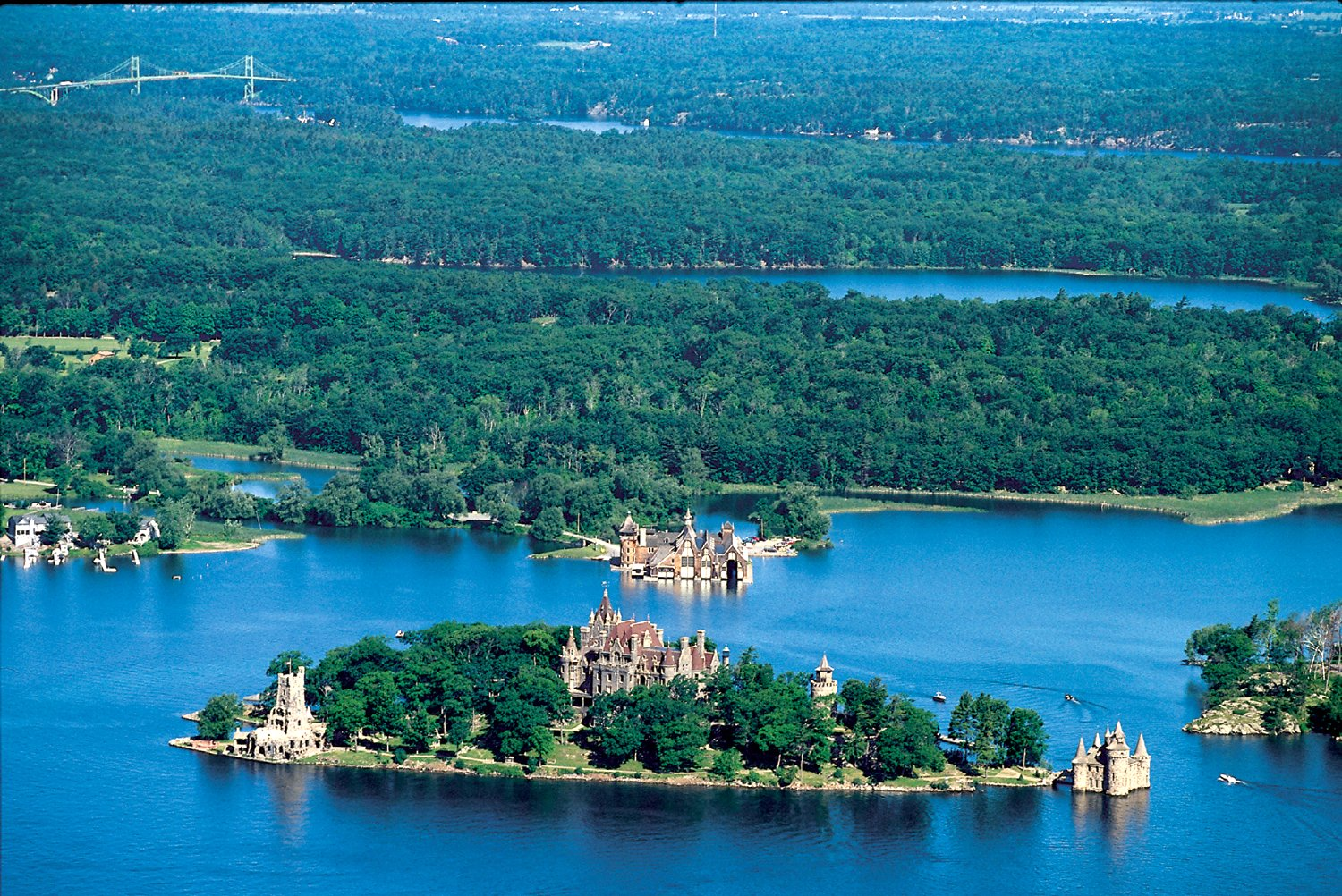
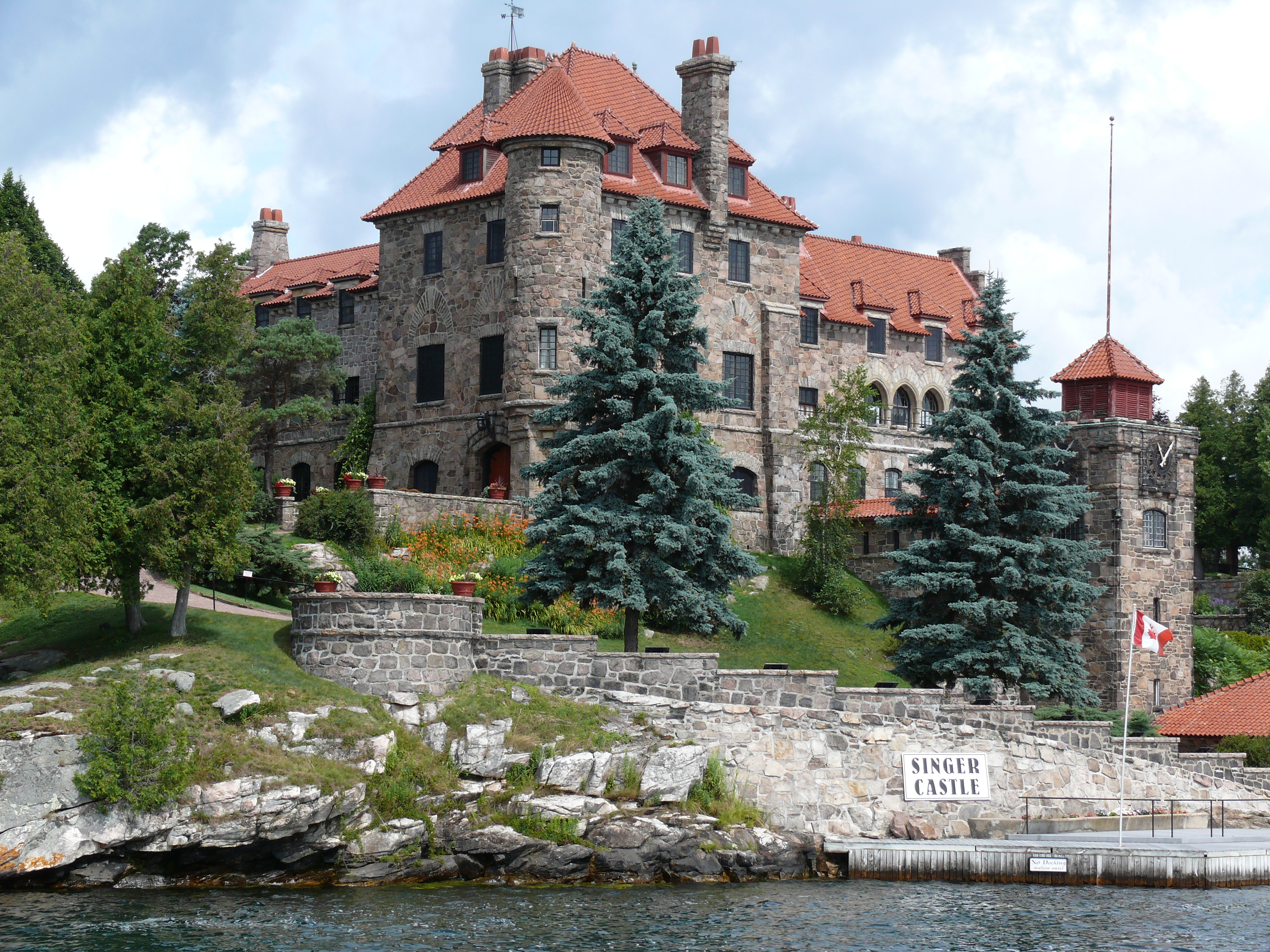
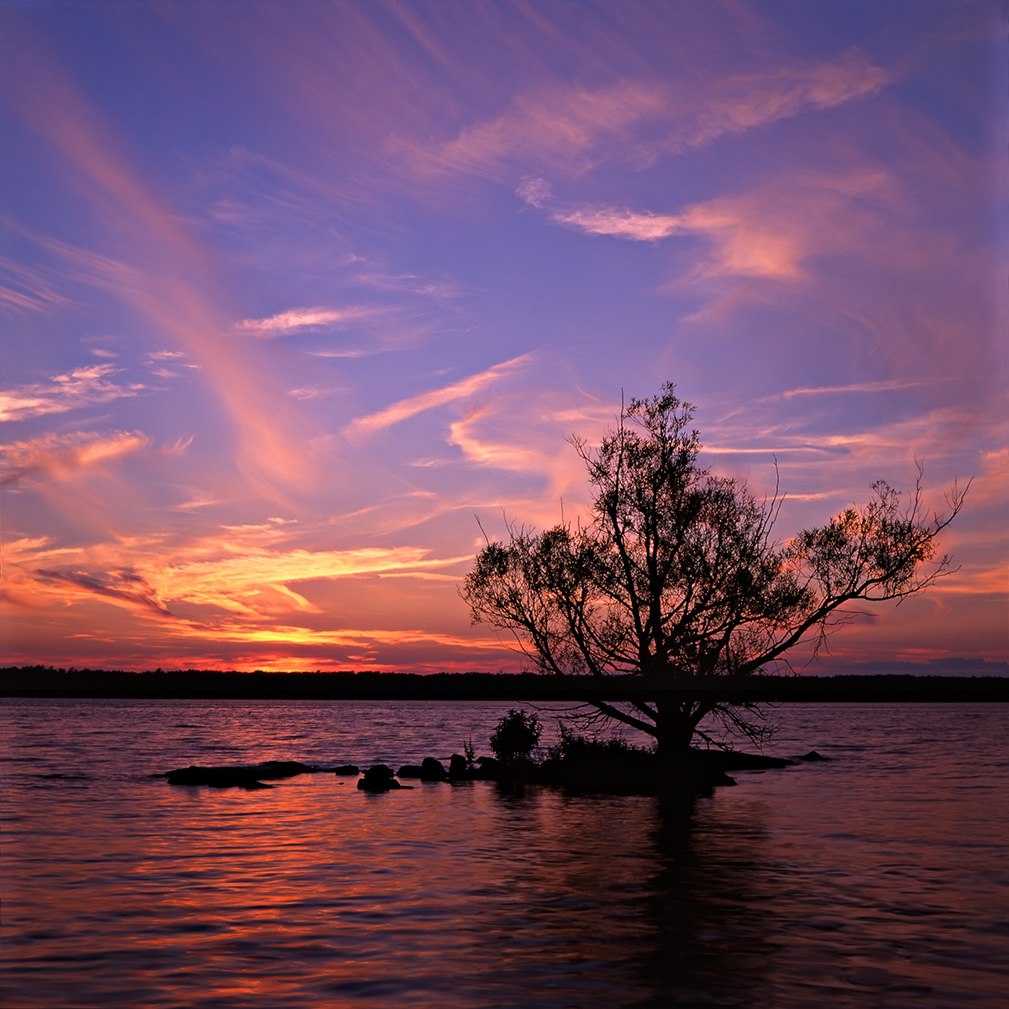
- Thousand Islands; Images top to bottom, left to right: 1898 touring map, Batterman's Point in Thousand Islands National Park, Thousand Islands Bridge, Boldt Castle, Singer Castle, Sunset over one of the smallest of the Thousand Islands

- Map of the Thousand Islands region

- Thousand Islands in North America
- Coordinates: 44°20′N 76°00′W
- Countries: Canada; Ontario; United States; New York
- Largest city: Canada; Kingston

The Thousand Islands (French: Mille-Îles, pronounced [mil il]) constitute a North American archipelago of 1,864 islands that straddles the Canada–US border in the Saint Lawrence River as it emerges from the northeast corner of Lake Ontario. They stretch for about 50 miles (80 km) downstream from Kingston, Ontario. The Canadian islands are in the province of Ontario and the U.S. islands in the state of New York.

The islands range in size from over 40 square miles (100 km^{2}) to smaller islands occupied by a single residence, or uninhabited outcroppings of rocks. To count as one of the Thousand Islands, emergent land within the river channel must have at least one square foot (0.093 m^{2}) of land above water level year-round, and support at least two living trees.

== Geography ==
The Thousand Islands archipelago is at the outlet of Lake Ontario at the head of the Saint Lawrence River. The region is bisected by the Canada–United States border and covers portions of Jefferson and St. Lawrence counties in the U.S. state of New York, in addition to parts of the United Counties of Leeds and Grenville and Frontenac County in the Canadian province of Ontario.

Geologically, most of the islands are where a branch of the Canadian Shield, known as the Thousand Islands – Frontenac Arch region, runs south across the river to join with the Adirondacks. This region was designated a World Biosphere Reserve by UNESCO in 2002.

=== Transportation ===
The Thousand Islands Bridge connects New York State and Ontario by traversing Wellesley Island at the northernmost point of Interstate 81 in Jefferson County and meets Highway 137, which leads to Highway 401. The waterfront is served by New York State Routes 12 and 37 and by the Thousand Islands Parkway in Ontario. Ontario also has the Waterfront Trail alongside the Parkway for cyclists who wish to see the area in an alternative way.

Seawaymax lake freighters often ply the Saint Lawrence Seaway. As is usual in inland waters of the United States and Canada, vessels must use maritime pilots to help them travel safely. In places, a vessel less than 25 feet (7.6 m) offshore can find itself in over 200 feet (61 m) of water. Conversely, rocks and shoals less than two feet (61 cm) underwater can be found in the center of otherwise deep waters. Due to the great number of rocks and shoals just above or below the water's surface, navigation outside of the marked channels at night can be dangerous.

Before the introduction of the invasive zebra mussel, visibility of only 10 to 15 feet (3.0 to 4.6 m) was usual, slightly decreasing as the years passed. Water clarity improved markedly in the mid-1990s with the arrival of zebra mussels, which feed on algae. The water is so clear in some areas a rocky bottom can be observed in 80 feet (24 m) of water. The area has several shipwrecks, and although most are over 100 feet (30 m) underwater, some are a mere 15 feet (4.6 m) down and can be seen from the surface.

=== Population centers ===
The single largest city in the region is Kingston, Ontario, which has a metropolitan population of more than 170,000 (2021). The city marks the western end of the region in Canada, while Brockville, Ontario, to the east, is the other large population center. The American region along the river is much less dense; the largest city is Watertown, New York, which has a population of 25,000 (2020) and is twenty miles (32 km) inland. There are a number of seasonal communities which grow significantly in the summer, like Thousand Island Park in New York.

In New York, United States

This region is within Jefferson County:

- Alexandria Bay
- Cape Vincent
- Clayton
- Henderson Harbor
- Sackets Harbor
- Northern Tug Hill
- Watertown

In Ontario, Canada

This region includes the southern areas of Frontenac and Leeds & Grenville counties:

- Brockville
- Gananoque
- Kingston
- Prescott
- Thousand Islands Parkway

=== Notable islands ===
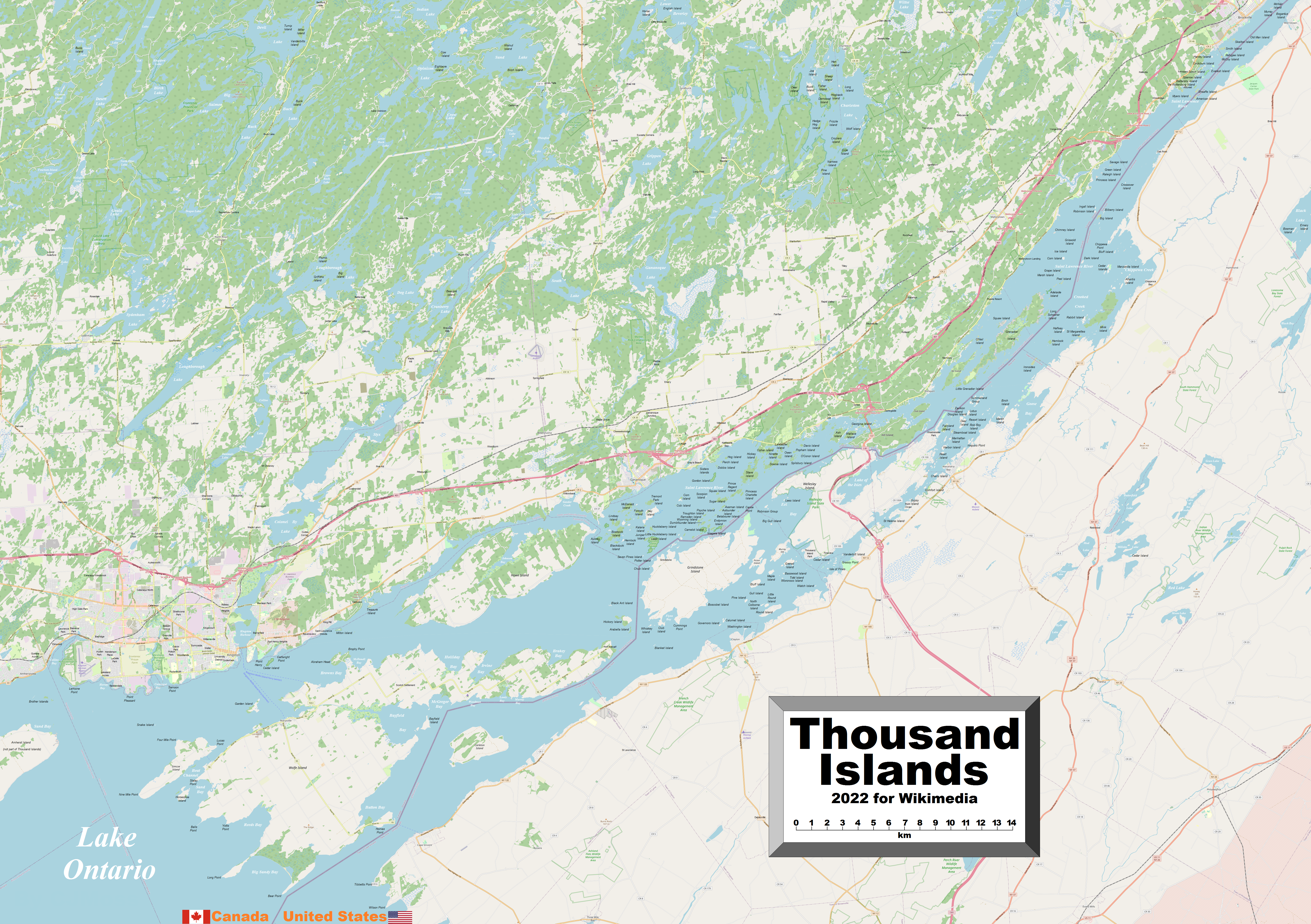
Detailed map of the Thousand Islands

- The largest island in the group, Wolfe Island, is entirely in Ontario. Other large islands in the archipelago include New York's Grindstone Island and Wellesley Island, and Ontario's Howe Island.
- Adjacent to Wolfe Island but part of New York is Carleton Island, the site of a ruined fort, Fort Haldimand, built in 1779 by the British during the American Revolutionary War. The island was captured by three American soldiers during the War of 1812 and remains part of the United States.
- Deer Island, about two miles (3.2 km) north of Alexandria Bay, is owned by the secret society of Skull and Bones.
- A pair of islands southwest of Grenadier Island are collectively called Zavikon Island. A popular but incorrect tale is that the larger island is in Canada, while the smaller one is in the United States, and the foot bridge between them is the shortest international bridge in the world. Zavikon Island is entirely in Canada and belongs to the Leeds and Grenville municipal unit.
- Longue Vue Island is the only artificial island in the region.
- Ironsides Island is home to one of the largest great blue heron rookeries in northern New York State, where over one thousand herons return to breed each April. The uninhabited rocky island near Alexandria Bay, New York, is owned by The Nature Conservancy and was listed as a National Natural Landmark in 1967.
- Calumet Island is near Clayton, New York. The privately owned island formerly featured a "castle" mansion belonging to New York tobacco tycoon Charles G. Emery, and later hosted a marina in the 1960s.
- Just Room Enough Island is the smallest inhabited island in the world.

== History ==
O boating on the rivers,
The voyage down the St. Lawrence, the superb scenery, the steamers,
The ships sailing, the Thousand Islands, the occasional timber-raft
and the raftsmen with long-reaching sweep-oars,
The little huts on the rafts, and the stream of smoke when they cook
supper at evening.

— Walt Whitman, "A Song of Joys", from Leaves of Grass (1855)

Prior to European colonization, the Thousand Islands region was home to, or visited by, members of the Iroquois Confederacy and Ojibwa people. Their name for the islands was Manitouana or the "Garden of the Great Spirit".

The region was a part of the War of 1812 between the British Empire and the United States. Many sites from the war can be found, such as Fort Wellington in Prescott, Ontario and the garrison on Chimney Island, Mallorytown, Ontario. Museums about the war can be found on both the Canadian and American side of the river.

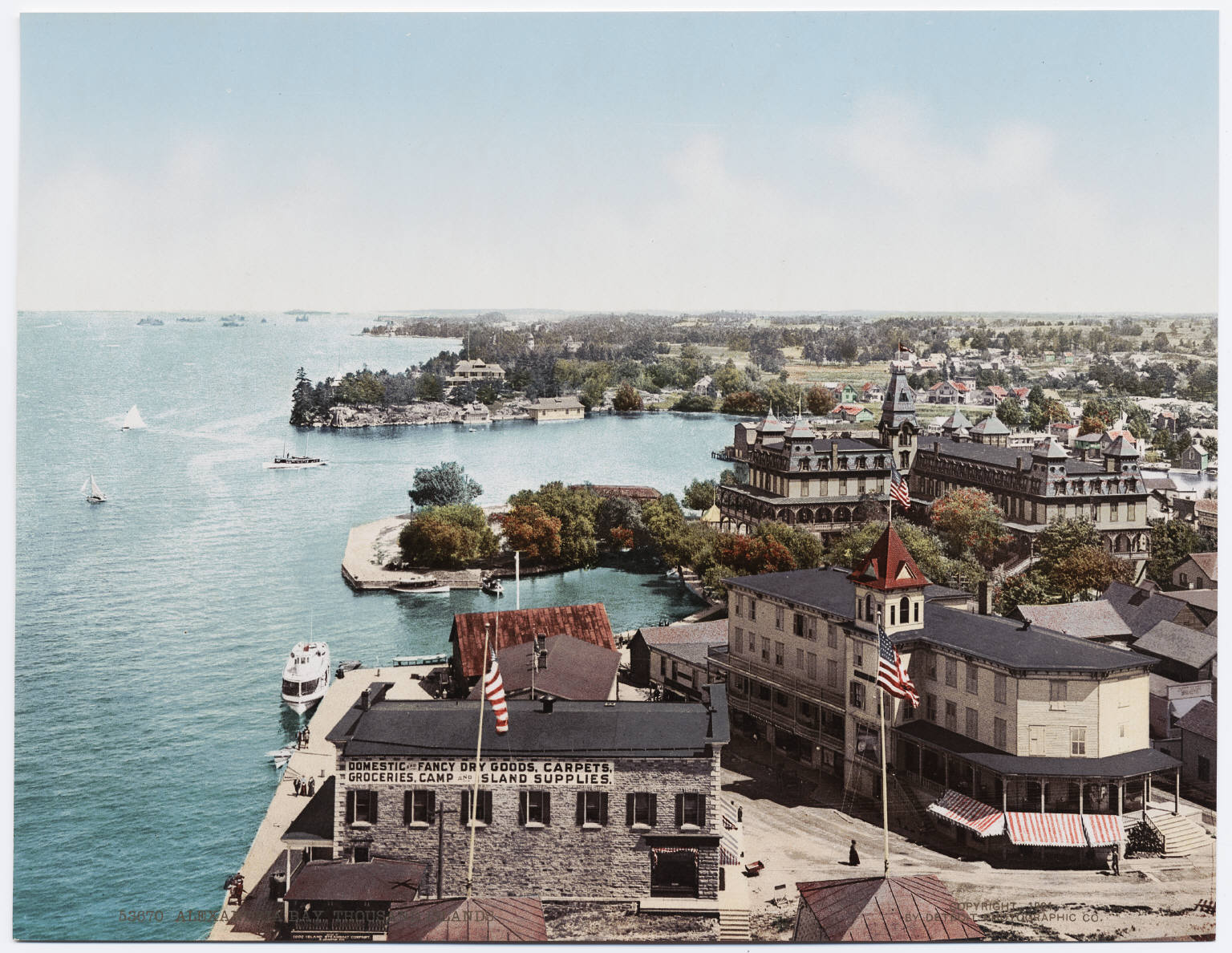
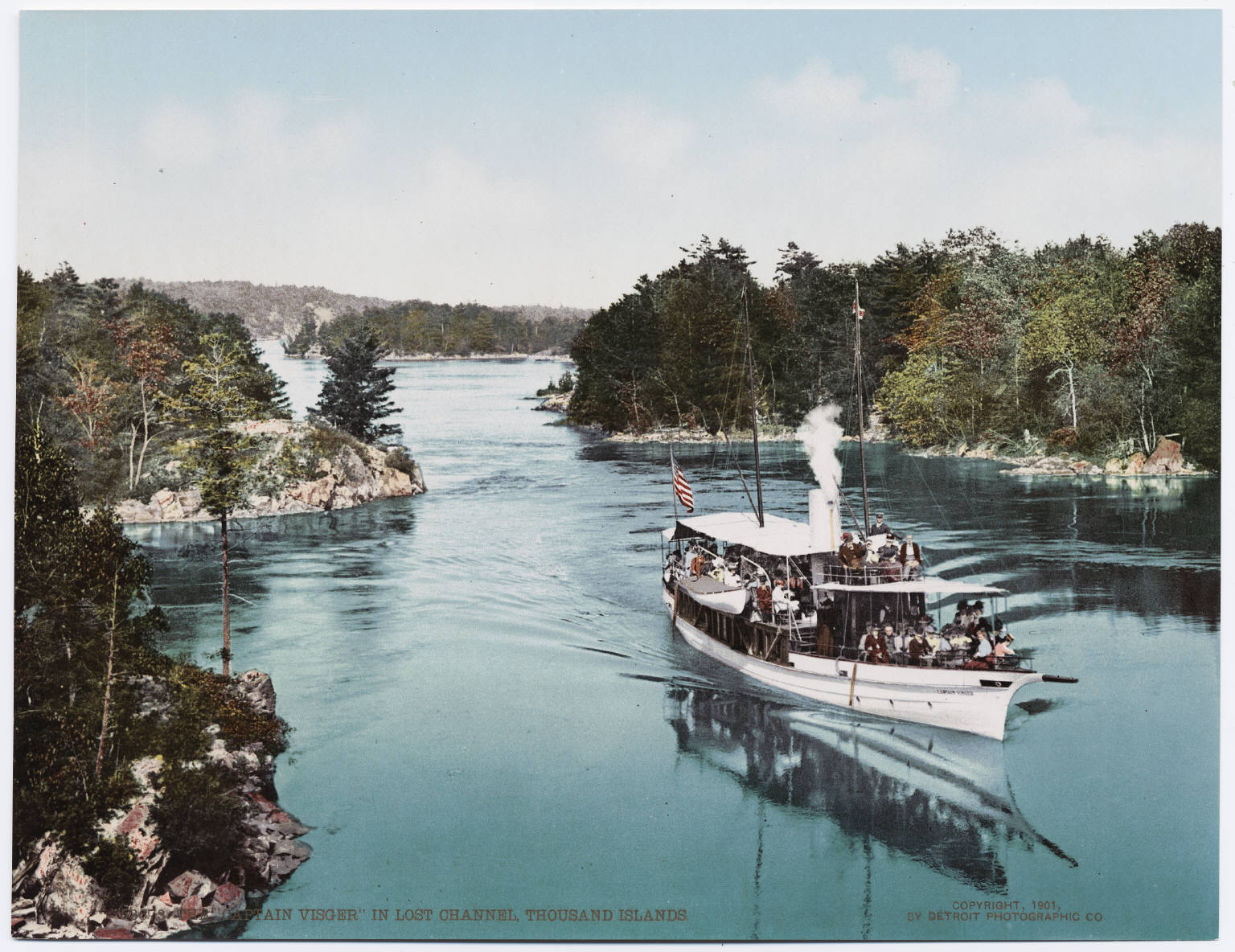
Historical postcard views of Alexandria Bay (left) and a steamboat touring Lost Channel, c. 1900

In the late 19th and early 20th centuries, many distinguished visitors made the region widely known as a summer resort. During the half century (1874–1912) of the resort's greatest prominence, most wealthy vacationers came from New York City, joined by prominent families from Chicago, Cleveland, Pittsburgh and other cities of the United States and Canada. Several grand hotels provided luxurious accommodations while steamboats offered extensive tours among the islands. Wealthy and middle-class summer residents built summer homes, and the region retains a historically important collection of vacation homes from this time.

Among the lavish homes built during this time were several masonry "castles", some of which remain as international landmarks. The region's first castle, Castle Rest, was built in 1888; it was destroyed in the mid-20th century. The most famous extant examples are "The Towers" on Dark Island, now called Singer Castle, and the previously long-neglected Boldt Castle on Heart Island, which had been left unfinished for over 75 years upon the untimely death of George Boldt's wife. It has since been completed over the recent decades in accord with Boldt's original plans.

The Thousand Islands have long been a center for recreational boating. Large steam yachts, many designed by Nathanael Herreshoff, required distinctive yacht houses. The region was known also for innovative power boating during this period. Three local yacht clubs hosted the Gold Cup Races of the American Power Boat Association for nine consecutive years.

== Recreation ==
=== Public parks ===
To be considered an island, a piece of land must stay above water throughout the year and support a living tree. Many of the islands are publicly owned. A group of 21 islands form the Thousand Islands National Park, the oldest of Canada's national parks east of the Rocky Mountains. The park hosts campgrounds, inland walking trails, annual family events, as well as a national heritage building.

Thirty New York state parks are managed as part of the New York State Office of Parks, Recreation and Historic Preservation's Thousand Islands Region, including many on river islands or along the New York shore. Many of these river parks were established in the late 19th and early 20th century as part of the St. Lawrence Reservation, and were among New York's earliest land acquisitions for the purpose of preservation and recreational development. Among the larger parks are Wellesley Island State Park, which includes the largest camping complex in the region, and Robert Moses State Park.

=== Other boating, fishing and vacationing locations ===
- One of the few beaches in the Thousand Islands, Potter's Beach (conserved by the Thousand Islands Land Trust) on the American Grindstone Island has a fine, shallow sandy bottom with a very gradual slope, and serves as a location for boats to set anchor and spend a day at the beach or hiking on the trails that extend around Grindstone Island.
- A popular location for swimming or anchoring out of the wind, the Lake of the Isles is a secluded area cut off from the rest of the St. Lawrence River by Wellesley Island and neighboring Canadian Hill Island. Access is limited through two narrow passages, one around the northeastern end of the island, and the other being the International Rift, which is a small, shallow, winding canal that leads you through to the north side of the island passing right underneath the customs bridge.
- Known for its fishing, especially pike, Eel Bay is a shallow bay just southwest of Wellesley Island.
- The Thousand Islands Land Trust (TILT) conserves over 8,500 acres (34 km^{2}) of land in the Thousand Islands region. This land includes many creeks, nature preserves and over 30 miles (48 km) of trails open to the public, year-round, free of charge. The Trust's annual series of programs – TILTreks, TeenTreks, KidsTreks and TILTKids Camp – give individuals and families the opportunity to participate in regional field trips and recreational activities as well as attend presentations on wildlife or habitat preservation. TILT's community events help further their conservation efforts in the Thousand Islands region.

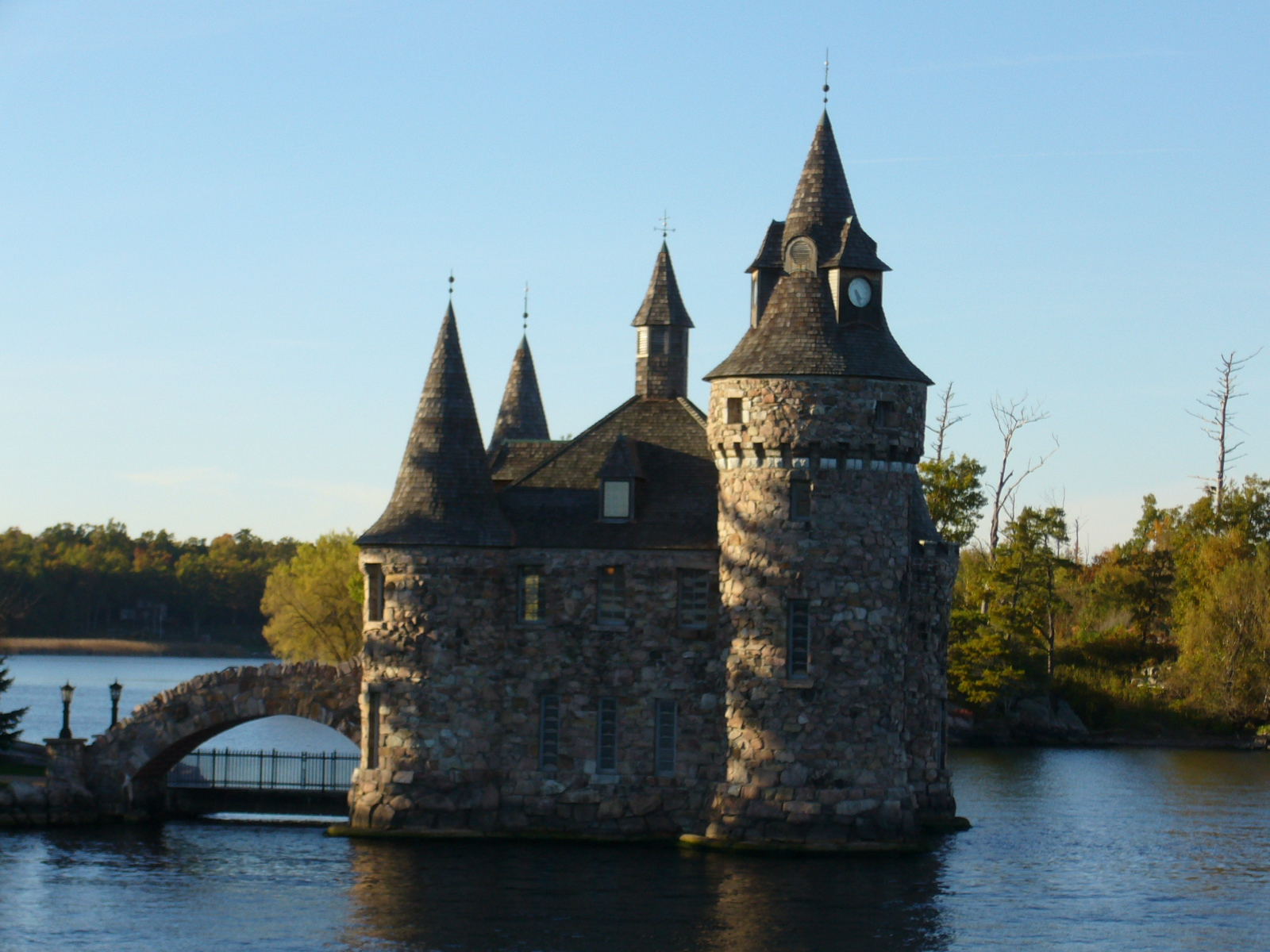
Powerhouse, Heart Island (Boldt Castle)

- Boldt Castle, a testament of one man's love of his wife, has been under renovation by its owner, the Thousand Islands Bridge Authority since 1977, and can be visited by boat or tour cruise. This 120-room mansion is on Heart Island just across the shipping channel from Alexandria Bay. The grounds consist of the main castle, the power house, the play house, and a boat house tucked in across the bay on the inside of the island.
- Though not as famous as George Boldt's Castle, Singer Castle on Dark Island is privately renovated and is open to tourists. Frederick Bourne had his castle constructed with secret passageways and hidden wine cellars so he could spy on his guests while keeping his liquor out of sight during the prohibition era.
- The Antique Boat Museum in Clayton, New York houses antique wooden boats used or built in the region. The museum also features exhibits on the region's maritime culture and is home to La Duchesse, George Boldt's luxury houseboat.
- Thousand Islands Boat Museum in Gananoque, Ontario is a young, hands-on waterfront museum celebrating the heritage of the St. Lawrence River. Workshops, events and a collection of 36 boats are on offer.
- The Thousand Islands also facilitates freshwater shipwreck diving. Numerous wrecks lay at the bottom of the seaway including America, Islander, and Keystorm. There are wrecks that are appropriate for all diving skill levels.

== Aviation and airports ==
Passenger air service to the Thousand Islands region is available in both Ontario and New York. Watertown International Airport (ART) in Watertown, New York has daily service on American Airlines connecting through Philadelphia (PHL). Norman Rogers Airport (YGK) in Kingston, Ontario offers service on FlyGTA Airlines connecting through Billy Bishop Toronto City Airport as well as service out of Montréal–Trudeau International Airport via Pascan Aviation. Both airports also offer private aviation services.

Maxson Airfield (FAA LID: 89NY) is a privately owned, private-use general aviation airport two nautical miles (3.7 km; 2.3 mi) south of the central business district of Alexandria Bay, a village in Jefferson County, New York. It once had commercial service provided by Mohawk Airlines. At that time, the airport bore the IATA airport code AXB. Maxson is available to the public by Maxson Airfield, LLC.

Brockville-Thousand Islands Regional Tackaberry Airport (IATA: XBR, TC LID: CNL3), also known as Brockville Municipal Airport, is a registered aerodrome in Elizabethtown-Kitley Township, 4.8 nautical miles (8.9 km; 5.5 mi) northwest of the city of Brockville, Ontario, Canada.

== Thousand Island dressing ==
According to The Oxford Companion of Food and Drink, the name for Thousand Island dressing "presumably comes from the Thousand Islands between the United States and Canada in the St. Lawrence River." However, several different versions of the dressing's origin exist. One common story describes how a fishing guide's wife, Sophia LaLonde, made the condiment as part of her husband George's shore dinner. Often in this version, actress May Irwin requested the recipe after enjoying it. Irwin in turn gave it to another Thousand Islands summer resident, George Boldt, who built Boldt Castle between 1900 and 1904. Boldt, as proprietor of the Waldorf-Astoria Hotel, instructed the hotel's maître d'hôtel, Oscar Tschirky, to put the dressing on the menu in 1894.

Sociologists attempting to determine the true origin of Thousand Island dressing found several conflicting origin stories exist, and they vary between the various islands and villages of the Thousand Islands region. None appear to have any strong written evidence to support their specific claims.

== Gallery ==
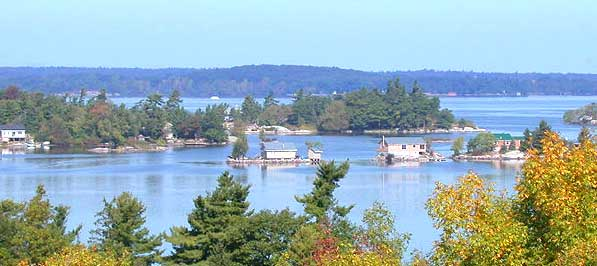
Several of the Thousand Islands viewed from New York toward Ontario

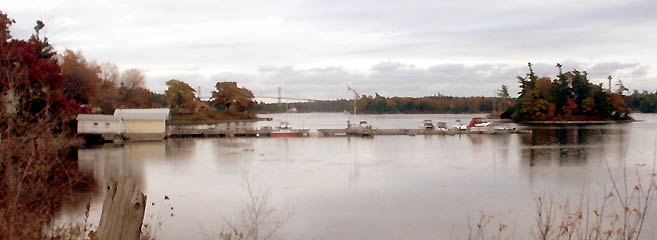
Thousand Islands near Ivy Lea, Ontario

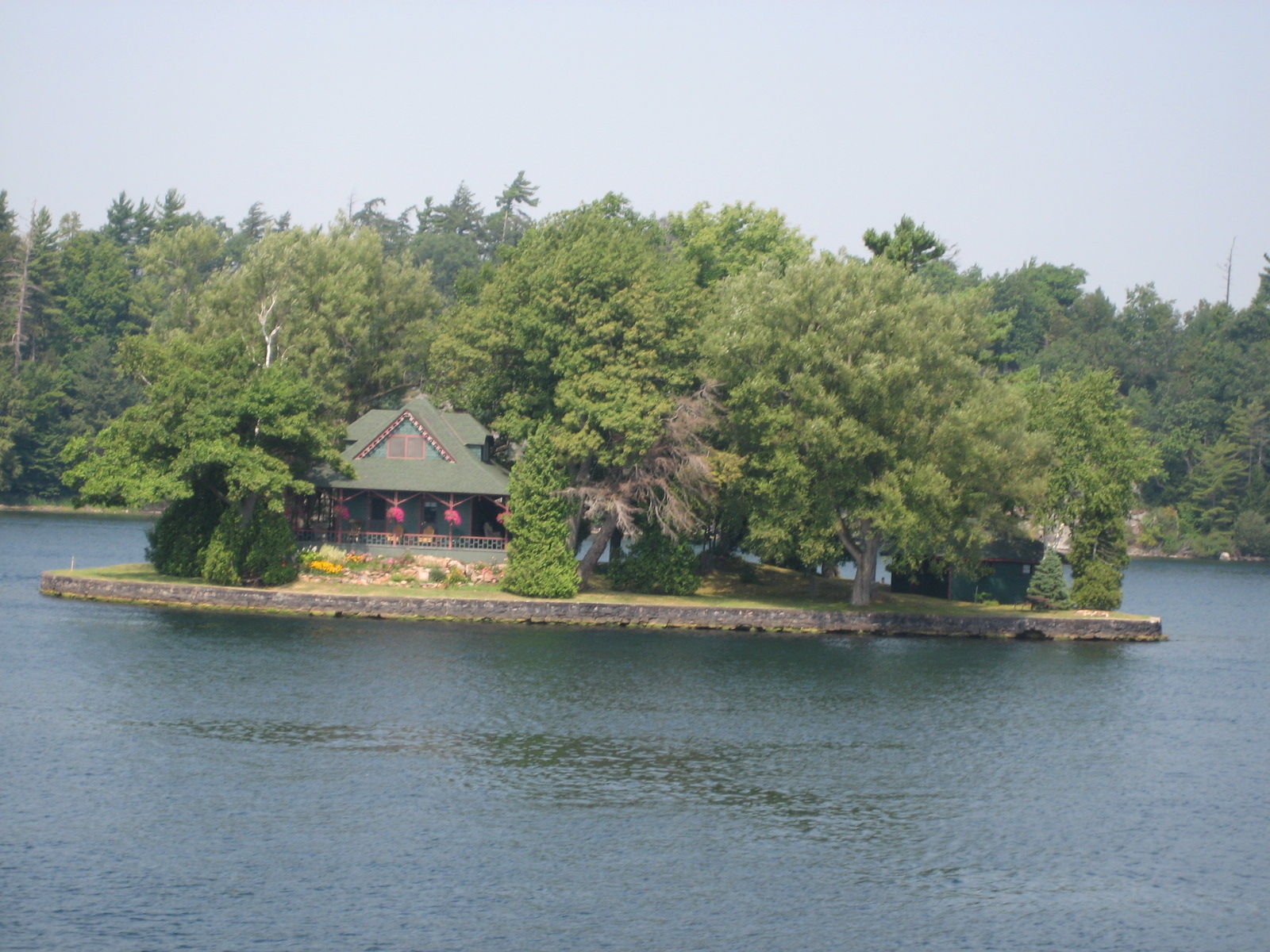
A house on one of the islands in the region

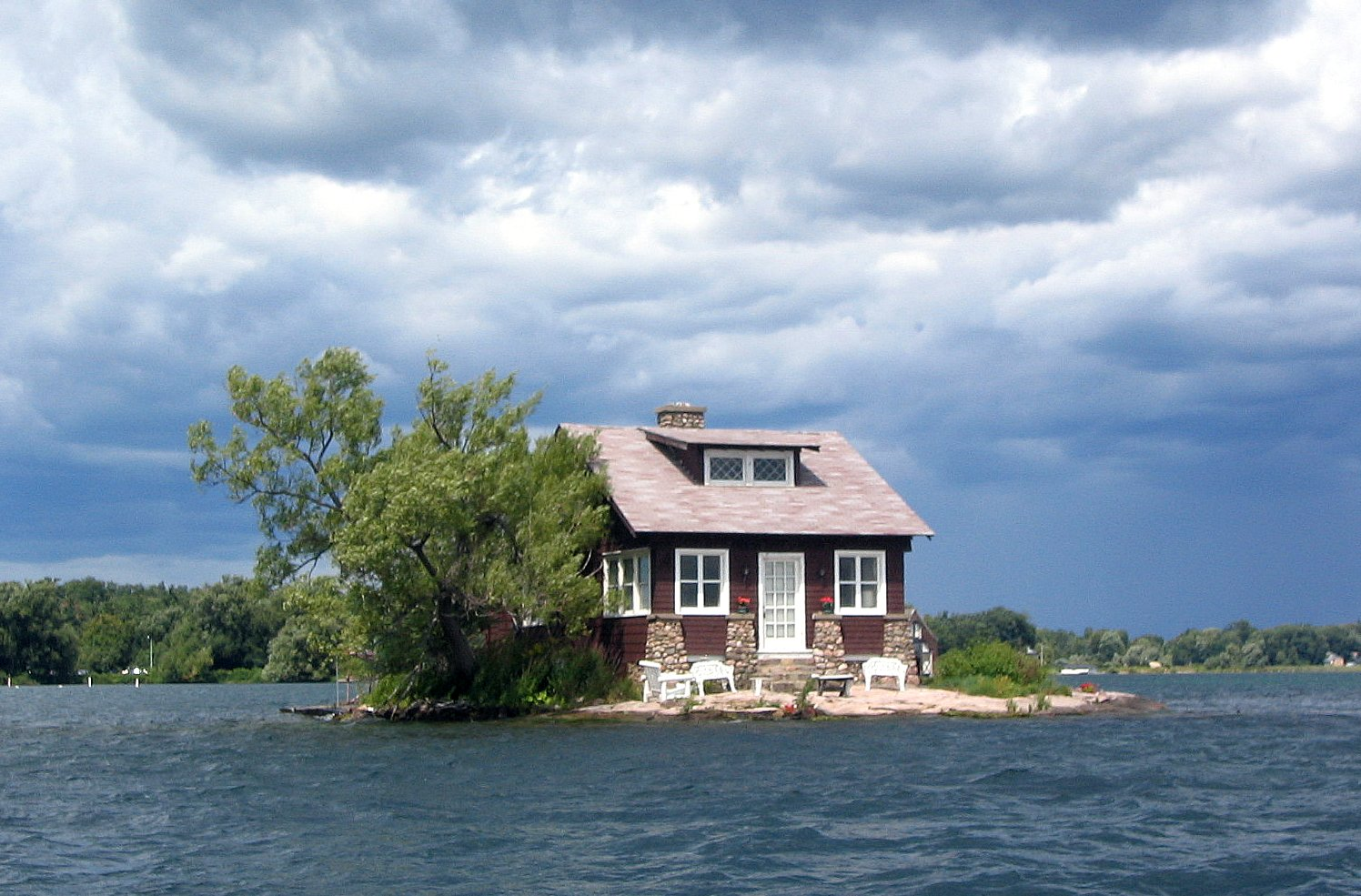
Just Room Enough Island

== See also ==
- Amherst Island
- Grenadier Island, New York
- Hochelaga Archipelago
- Murray Isle
- Sugar Island
- Southern Ontario
- Upstate New York
