= Zavikon Island =

Island in Ontario, Canada

Coordinates: 44.3696°N 75.9137°W

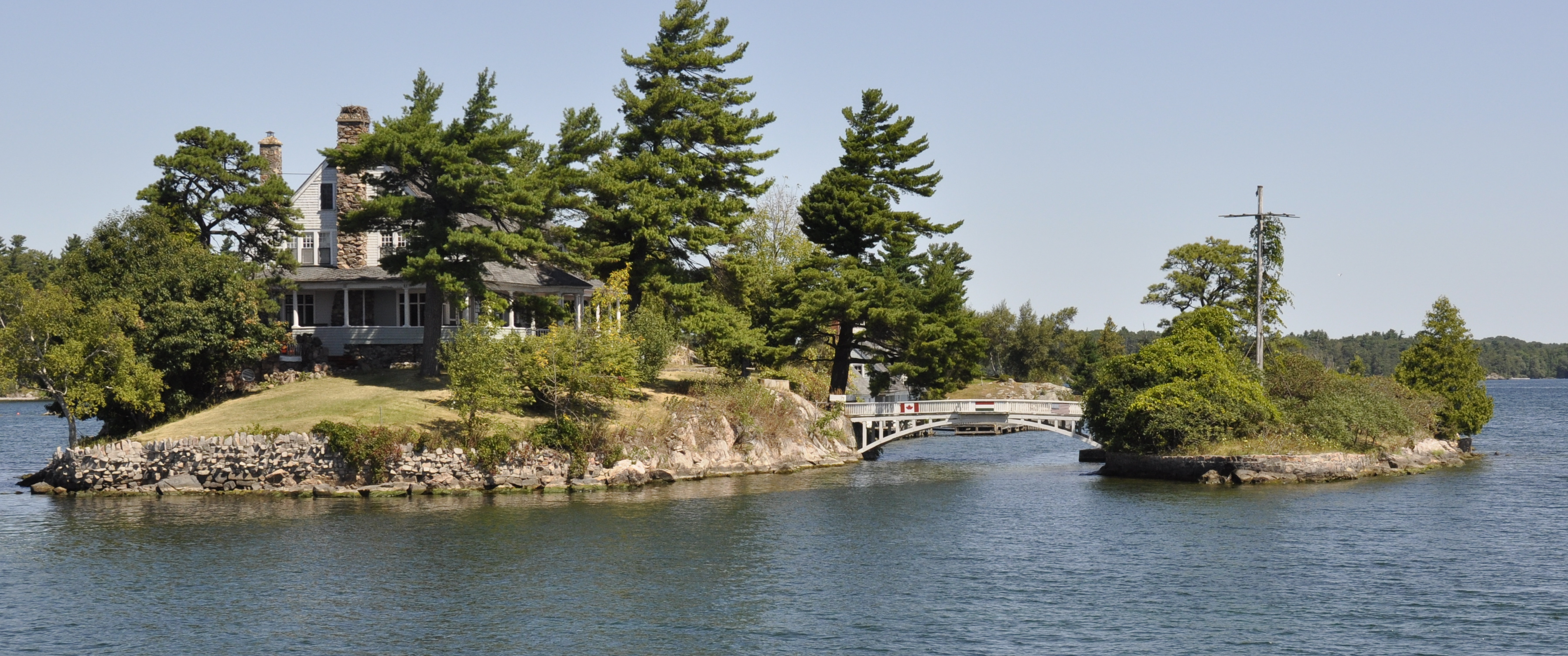
Zavikon Island(s) showing "international bridge" with Canadian, Hungarian and American flags

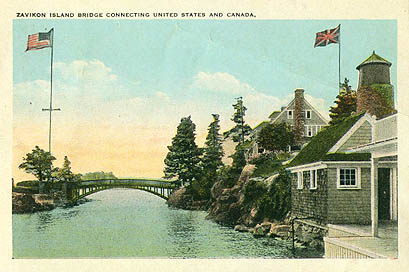
Antique image that suggests an international border crossing.

Zavikon Island refers to either the larger or the pair of islands in the Thousand Islands archipelago on the St. Lawrence River between New York and Ontario, two kilometres (1¼ miles) southeast of Rockport, Ontario and approximately 200 metres (660 ft) north of the international boundary. Zavikon Island is located in Canadian territory and is part of the township of Leeds and the Thousand Islands in the United Counties of Leeds and Grenville.

== Overview ==
In April 1975, Donald Rickerd bought the two islands. A bridge connects the larger island to the smaller island. A Canadian flag hangs on the bridge near the larger island, and an American flag adorns the other side. A Hungarian flag hangs on the middle of the bridge in honour of the Hungarian heritage of his wife, Julie Rékai Rickerd. In February 1988, Zavikon Island was established as the official name of the larger island, replacing its previous official name Aspasia Island.

The smaller and more southeasterly of the pair of islands is sometimes called Little Zavikon Island. It has a US-Canada Boundary Commission reference monument, from which surveying measurements are used to calculate the international border line turning point at this section of the river. In this case, the international border's turning point is approximately 140 metres (460 ft) southeast of the southern tip of Little Zavikon Island as shown on the largest scale USGS map of the area.

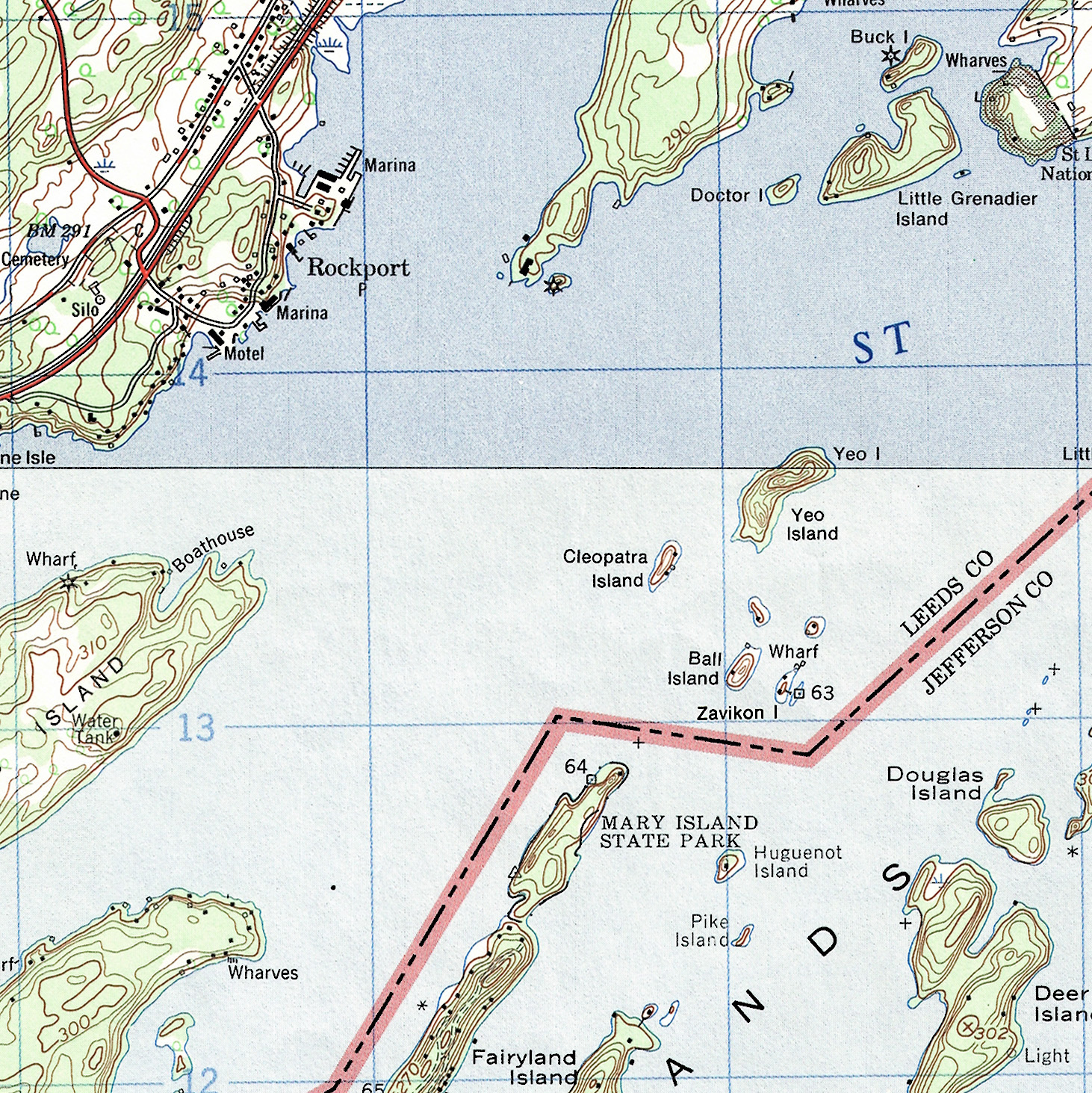
Detail of topographic maps showing Zavikon Island and surrounding area in 1975. (Natural Resources Canada, National Topographic System, Scale 1:25,000, maps 031b05d and 031b05e, 1977.)

A popular misconception is that the larger island is in Canada while Little Zavikon Island is in the United States, and that the footbridge between them is the shortest international bridge in the world. As demonstrated by Canada's official topographic map of the area (see image), both Zavikon islands are wholly within Canada.

== The Zavikon estate ==
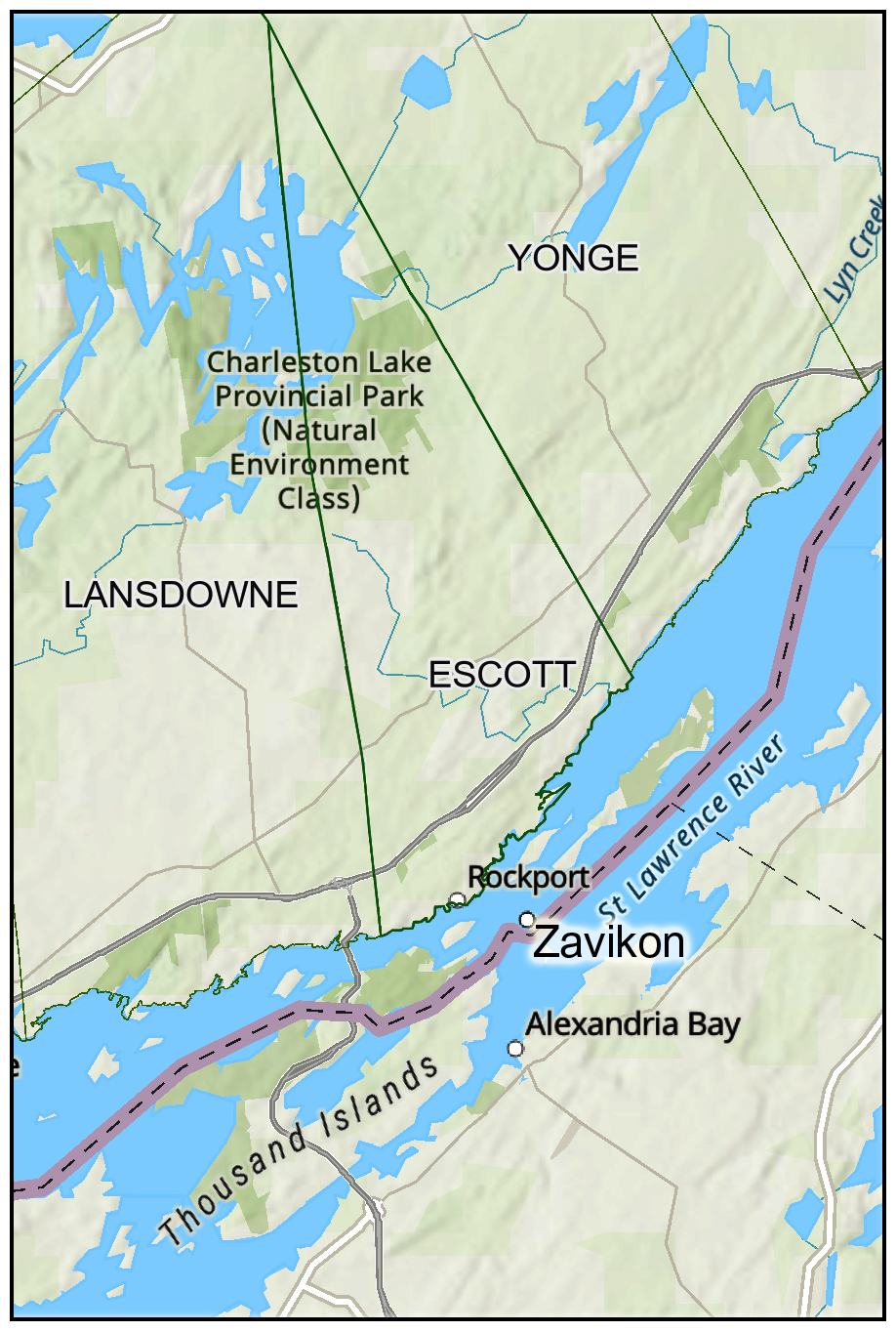
Map of geographic Township of Escott, with flanking geographic townships of Lansdowne and Yonge, 2026. (Ontario, Ministry of Natural Resources, Office of the Surveyor General. Ontario GeoHub.)

The Zavikon estate was established at the beginning of the 1900s as a privately-owned country retreat located entirely within Canada among the islands attached to the geographic Township (Note: In Ontario, townships can be geographic (unincorporated land subdivision based on original surveys) or municipal (incorporated unit of governance), whose respective borders may or may not be coterminous with those of the other. For example, the current municipal Township of Athens was created January 1, 2001, by the amalgamation of the Village of Athens (incorporated January 1, 1889, via county by-law) and the municipal Township of Rear of Yonge and Escott (established January 1, 1854, via provincial statute). The latter municipality comprised the northern sections of the geographic Township of Escott and the geographic Township of Yonge.) of Escott, (Note: Since January 1, 2001, the southern part of the geographic Township of Escott, previously known municipally as the Township of Front of Escott, has been part of the municipal Township of Leeds and the Thousand Islands.) Ontario (see image). Since its formation, the estate has comprised three officially recognized islands:

- Aspasia Island (officially known since February 1988 as Zavikon Island) at 1.4 acres;
- Island 103A, southeast of Aspasia, at 0.3 acres; and the
- Very small, low-lying Island 103B, off Aspasia's northeastern tip, at 0.05 acres.

Island 103B is visible in some aerial photographs and was used as the base for the outer section of a large deck extending from Aspasia Island. Island 103A and Island 103B are the designations used on the official land plan in lieu of lot numbers or official names, such as Aspasia Island.

Following a June 1918 change in the ownership of the estate, a second title, Zavikon Island, was used for the aggregate property by its new owners. A short silent film, Zavikon, illustrating the estate circa 1929, is posted online.

=== History of the estate ===
The three islands of the Zavikon estate had once been part of the lands of the indigenous Mississaugas (Note: Mississaugas was also spelled in period documents as Mississagas and Mississaguas.) of Alnwick. In 1856, this group of Mississauga Ojibweg surrendered their islands in the Thousand Islands region of the St. Lawrence River to the Crown. The agreement required that the funds from the sale of the surrendered islands be invested and the interest paid annually to the Alnwick Mississaugas, who are now known as the Alderville First Nation.

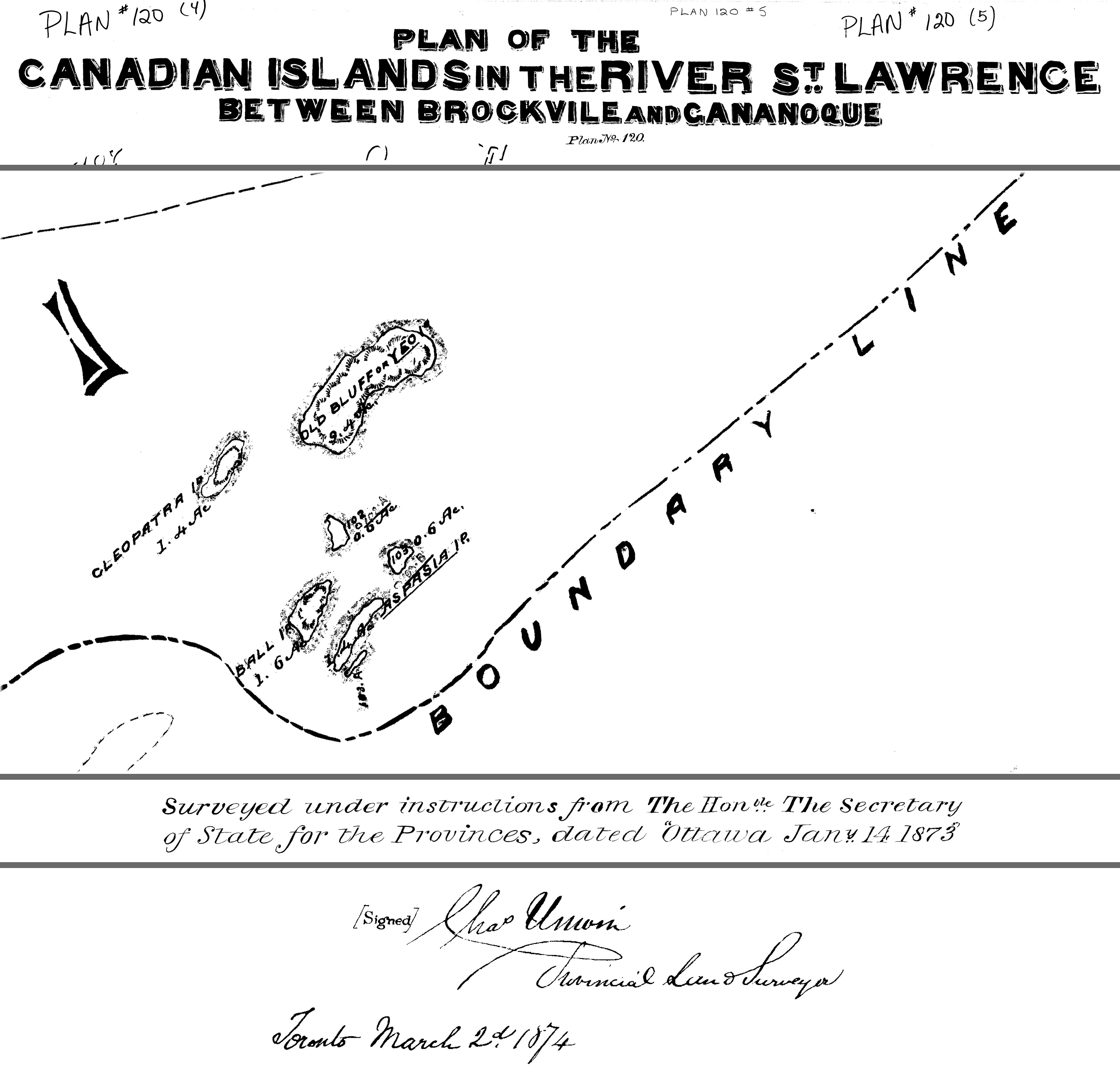
Aspasia Island and vicinity from Official Land Plan of 1874, prepared at the direction of Canada's Secretary of State for the Provinces. (Ontario Land Registry, Leeds LRO 28, Plan PL120.)

An official survey of the Canadian Thousand Islands between Gananoque and Brockville was done in 1873 at the direction of Canada's Secretary of State for the Provinces (who was also Superintendent General of Indian Affairs) and published in March 1874 (see image). A copy was deposited as Plan 120 in Ontario's Land Registry Office for Leeds County (Leeds LRO 28) in December 1882. Additions were made to the official plan in April 1893 as per a new survey. These additions included the previously absent Island 103B and a label for previously unnumbered Island 103A.

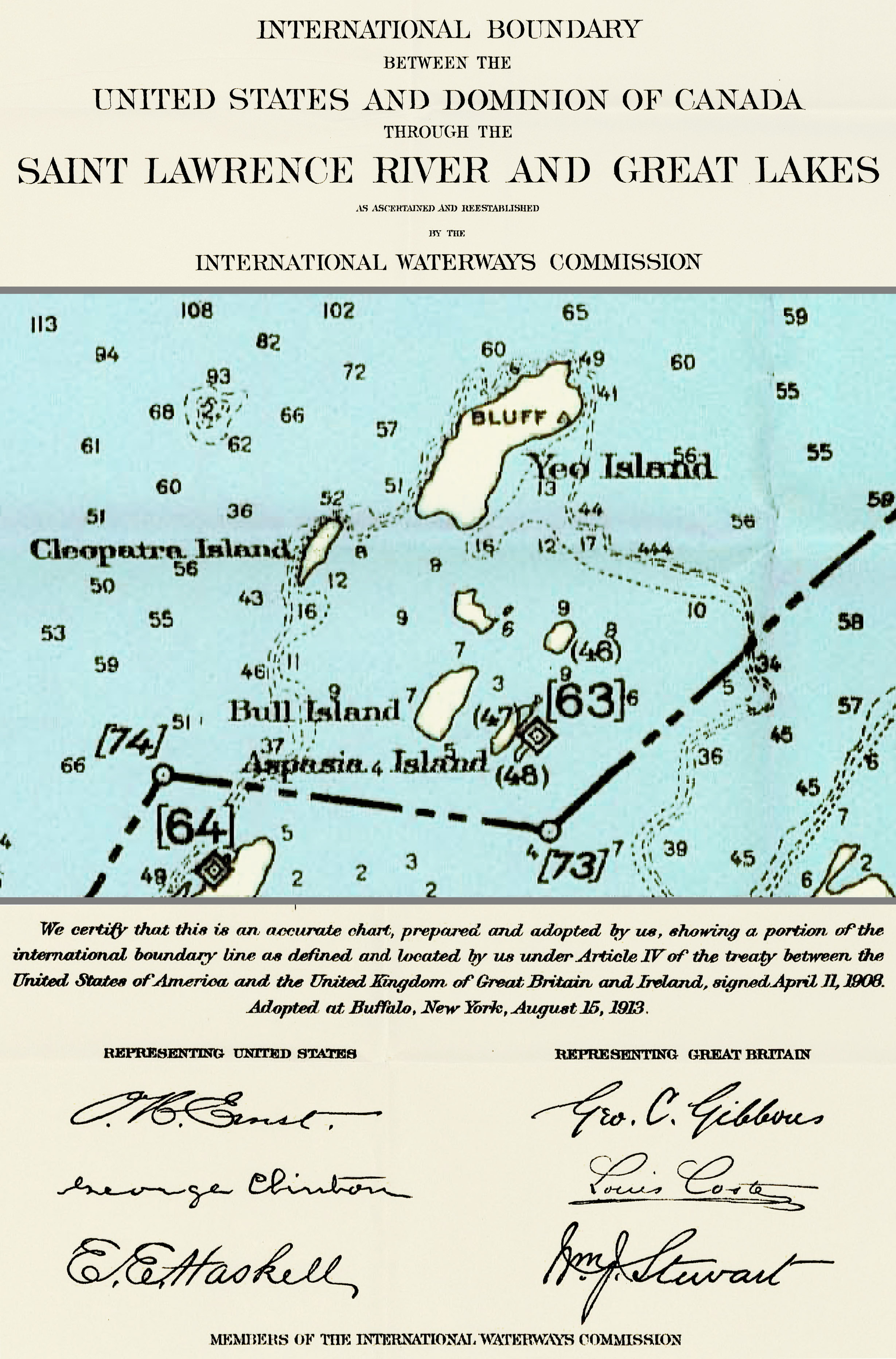
Details of chart for Canada-US boundary in the vicinity of Aspasia Island (Zavikon estate), approved 1913, issued 1915, and produced under a treaty of 1908. (International Boundary Commission – Commission de la frontière internationale, Map C-5 online.)

Following the 1893 survey, the Canada-US boundary through the St. Lawrence River was more precisely demarcated under a UK-US treaty of 1908. The new charts for the boundary (see image) were approved in August 1913, engraved on copper printing plates during 1913–1914, (Note: The copper plates were not completed until November 1914 due to a shortage of engravers.(Ref., re: copper, pp. 28, 114, 115, online images 34, 120, 121; re: Nov 1914, pp. 29 & 120, online images 35 & 126.)) and issued in May 1915 by the binational International Waterways Commission, which had conducted the new surveys.

Ownership of each of the three islands that would become the Zavikon estate was transferred individually by the Department of Indian Affairs via Crown Land Patents in 1894, 1897, and 1901, respectively. In accordance with the 1856 surrender, the patents stated that the islands were sold "in order that the proceeds may be applied to the benefit, support and advantage" of the Mississaugas of Alnwick. The documents cited the official survey plans of 1874 and 1893 as held in the Department rather than the Plan 120 held in the local Land Registry Office.

The first private owners of the respective islands were as follows:

- Aspasia Island – Charles Berkeley Powell of Ottawa, Ontario – November 21, 1894;
- Island 103A – William George Hurdman of Ottawa, Ontario – December 27, 1897;
- Island 103B – Emilie Delphine Robb of New York City (Brooklyn) – November 2, 1901, as per an agreement of October 9.

Emilie D. Robb (née Taylor, also known as "Mrs. Alexander Robb") purchased Aspasia Island and Island 103A from Powell and Hurdman on October 16 and 12, 1901, respectively. Her country house was completed in August 1902 and the estate was given the name of Zavikon.

Zavikon was frequently misspelled in early newspaper reports, e.g., Zavicon, Zabikon, Zaoikon. The entries for Emilie and Alexander Robb in the annual Brooklyn Blue Book and Long Island Society Register of 1910–1922 spelled the title as Zavikön, with two dots (umlaut) above the "o". This spelling was also used in the Robbs' entries in the 1910–1915 annual summer issues of Social Register: "Robb Mr & Mrs Alex (Emily D Taylor). 'Zavikön' Alexandria Bay NY" [bold emphasis added].

The application of the name Zavikon to the entire three-island estate is demonstrated by the June 1918 deed that transferred its ownership from Emilie D. Robb to Andrew McLean of the City of Passaic, New Jersey. This deed described the property as follows:

- "... Three certain parcels or tracts of land and premises situate, lying and being in the St. Lawrence River, lying opposite Lot Number Nine (9) in the broken front of the Township of Escott in the County of Leeds and Province of Ontario, the whole of such parcels being commonly known as 'Zavikon' and being respectively described as follows:
- Firstly: 'Aspasia Island', containing by admeasurement one acre, and two-fifths of an acre, be the same more or less, as shown on a Plan of Record in the Department of Indian Affairs prepared by Charles Unwin, Provincial Land Surveyor, dated at Toronto March 2nd, 1874;
- Secondly: 'Island No. 103-A', containing Three-tenths of one acre, be the same more or less, as shown on a Plan of Record in the Department of Indian Affairs prepared by Walter Beatty, Provincial Land Surveyor, dated at Ottawa 20th April, 1893;
- Thirdly: 'Island No. 103-B', containing one-twentieth of one acre, be the same more or less, as shown on a Plan of Record in the Department of Indian Affairs prepared by Walter Beatty, Provincial Land Surveyor, dated at Ottawa 20th April, 1893." [italic and bold emphases added]

At some point following this transaction, the new owner adopted the title of Zavikon Island for the estate. In June 1931, when the executors of the will of Andrew McLean sold the estate to Philip A. Castner of Philadelphia, Pennsylvania, the above text was repeated nearly verbatim in the applicable deeds with the substitution of Zavikon Island for Zavikon.

In subsequent transfers of ownership, the text quoted above – with the title Zavikon Island for the three-island estate – was repeated in the respective deeds:

- 1945 May – Heir and estate of Phillip A. Castner to Leon Edson Lewis of Rochester, New York;
- 1950 September – Leon Edson Lewis to Robert F. Rich and Julia T. Rich of Woolrich, Pennsylvania;
- 1951 January – R.F. Rich and J.T. Rich to Woolrich Woolen Mills, with the belated approval of a Licence in Mortmain; (Note: As a company not incorporated under the laws of Ontario, Woolrich Woolen Mills was required to obtain an Ontario Licence in Mortmain to legally purchase, own, and in any way transfer any interest in the three Zavikon islands. However, this was done after the fact and the licence was not issued until February 1960.)
- 1975 April – Woolrich Woolen Mills to Donald Sheridan Rickerd (Note: Donald S. Rickerd was a lawyer and President of the philanthropic Donner Canadian Foundation.) of Toronto, Ontario, via a Deed of Land to Uses. (Note: A Deed of Land to Uses transferred all rights to the use of the land in any way and released all of the grantor's claims to the land. This instrument blocked a wife from exercising her dower rights to the property, i.e., a wife's legal claim to a share in the property of her husband. In Ontario, dowers were replaced in 1978 by equal rights of possession.)

In Woolrich Woolen Mills' 1974 and 1975 filings with the Ontario authorities, the company gave its address in Ontario as "Aspasia Islands 103-A and 103-B, Municipality of Front of Ascot [sic]". On February 12, 1988, Aspasia Island was officially renamed Zavikon Island. As of March 23, 2026, no transactions for the estate have been registered at the Land Registry Office since May 1975.
